= Baccilieri =

Baccilieri is a surname. Notable people with the surname include:

- Bobby Bacala Baccilieri, character from The Sopranos
- Ferdinando Maria Baccilieri (1821–1893), Italian Roman Catholic priest
- Uber Baccilieri (1923–2007), Italian boxer
