= Bonaventura Tornielli =

Italian Roman Catholic priest

Blessed Bonaventura Tornielli O.S.M.

Priest
- Born: 1411; Forlì, Papal States
- Died: 31 March 1491 (aged 80); Udine, Papal States
- Venerated in: Roman Catholic Church
- Beatified: 6 September 1911, Saint Peter's Basilica, Kingdom of Italy by Pope Pius X
- Feast: 31 March
- Attributes: Servite habit; Banner; Cross
- Patronage: Missionaries; Catechists

Bonaventura Tornielli (1411 - 31 March 1491) was an Italian Roman Catholic priest and a professed friar from the Servite Order. Tornielli was born into a noble household and was a noted preacher in which he visited numerous Italian cities such as Florence and Perugia - Pope Sixtus IV held him in high esteem and even named him the "Apostolic Preacher". He also held various positions of leadership within his order.

His beatification was approved under Pope Pius X on 6 September 1911.

== Life ==
Bonaventura Tornielli was born in 1411 in Forlì to the nobleman Giacomo Tornielli.

Tornielli enlisted into the Servite Order in 1448 where he became noted as a biblical expert and was later ordained as a priest. He completed his studies in Venice in 1454 after having started in 1448 and earned his master's degree in his theological studies - even at this stage he was reported to be small and thin and haggard in appearance. He became noted for his love of contemplative silence in which to meditate on the Gospel while also preaching sermons and missions in the Papal States and in other Italian cities all on the subject of repentance. His fame for personal holiness spread at a rapid pace even to the ears of Pope Sixtus IV who named him as the "Apostolic Preacher". Tornielli served for an unknown duration as his order's vicar-general in addition to having also served as its prior and provincial.

In 1468 he led a sermon before the senate of the Republic of Venice (also to them in 1482) and in 1488 at the San Marco Basilica. He also led sermons in Florence at the cathedral at the request of their senate and also at the SS. Annunziata in 1481. Tornielli also preached during a period of plague in 1476 in both Bologna and Perugia. In 1483 he served as prior of the San Marcello convent in Rome and there decided to retire with six others to a hermitage after receiving papal permission to do so; he might have spent time in Monte Senario. This was short lived for Sixtus IV requested on 31 May 1483 that he preach in the Papal States. Tornielli participated in the General Chapter of his order in 1485 in Vetralla and again in 1488 at Bologna where he spoke.

It was said that he walked barefoot regardless of the weather conditions and also refrained from consuming both meat and wine. Fra Filippo Albrizzi wrote: "He was a priest of great holiness. His beard was unkempt; his feet were bare suffering the heat of summer and the freezing cold of winter. He never wore shoes and his feet were often seen to be bleeding". Tornielli also slept either on the floor or on a bed of wooden planks.

Tornielli died on 31 March 1491 - on Holy Thursday - in Udine where he was preaching for the Lenten season. In 1507 the Lieutenant Andrea Loredan was on a trip from Venice to Udine when he fell ill and was cured after turning to the late Tornielli for healing. Tornielli's remains were moved in 1509 to Venice in the church of Saint Mary of the Servants that Loredan himself oversaw. His remains were relocated to the private home of a Servite priest - due to the Napoleonic invasion - and later to the church of SS. Ermagora e Fortunato where it remained until 1908 when moved to the church of the Sacred Heart; his remains now lie in Udine since 1971.

== Beatification ==
The beatification for the late priest received approval from Pope Pius X in a decree issued on 6 September 1911 after the latter confirmed the priest's longstanding and popular local 'cultus' - otherwise known as enduring veneration - that could be seen in cities such as Udine and Venice.
