= Seven Holy Founders of the Servite Order =

Seven founders of a Roman Catholic order

- Venerated in: Catholic Church
- Beatified: 1 December 1717 by Clement XI
- Canonized: 15 January 1888 by Pope Leo XIII
- Feast: 17 February

The Seven Holy Founders of the Servite Order (Bonfilius, Alexis, Manettus, Amadeus, Hugh, Sostene and Buonagiunta) were seven men of the town of Florence who became bound to each other in a spiritual friendship and started the Servite Order in the 13th century. They felt called by Mary, mother of Jesus, towards whom they practised an intense devotion. They reported a vision, apparently shared by all separately at the same moment. None of them was aware that the others also had experienced it. The call was to "leave the world, the better to serve almighty God".

Bonfilius was born Bonfilius Monaldi (Italian: Buonfiglio dei Monaldi), Alexis was born Alexis Falconieri (Alessio Falconieri; 1200 – 17 February 1310), Manettus was born Benedict dell'Antella (Benedetto dell' Antella), Amadeus born Bartholemew Amidei (also Bartolomeo degli Amidei; died 1265), Hugh was born Ricovero Uguccioni (Ricovero dei Lippi-Ugguccioni)), Sostene was born Gerardino Sostegni (Gherardino di Sostegno) and Buonagiunta was born John Manetti (Giovanni di Buonagiunta, or Bonajuncta). They were beatified as a group on 1717 and canonized in 1888.

== The founders ==
=== Alexis Falconieri ===
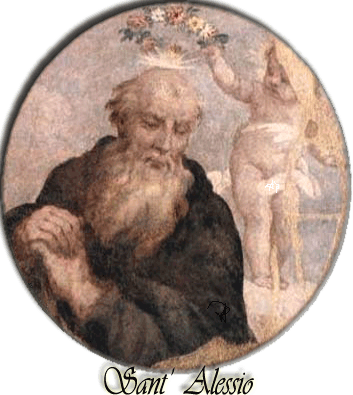
Sant Alessio Falconieri (Second of The Seven Holy Founders by age, Last to pass away).

Falconieri was one of the seven founders of the Servite Order, who are celebrated together on the anniversary of his death.

Life

He was the son of Bernardo Falconieri, a merchant prince of Florence, and one of the leaders of the Republic. His family belonged to the Guelph party. In keeping with their political principles, they took every opportunity to frustrate a Ghibelline (imperialist cause). In those days the Ghibellines in Florence had become tainted with Catharism.

Notwithstanding prospects as a wealthy nobleman in one of Italy's richest and most cultured cities, Falconieri grew up practising the most profound humility. Falconieri joined the Laudesi, a pious Marian confraternity, where he met the six who were to accompany him on his consecrated life. Apparently he experienced a Marian apparition on 15 August 1233, as did his six companions. Soon afterwards they founded the Order of the Servites. Falconieri at once abandoned all worldly things, and retired to La Camarzia, a house on the outskirts of the town. The next year he moved to Monte Senario, where a hermitage and church were founded. Falconieri was bestowed the title of Founder and Mystic. Only after the intervention of the bishop of Florence and Cardinal Castiglione in 1240 were novices accepted into the order. The rule of Augustine of Hippo and the Dominican Constitutions set the tone. Wearing a black habit and living in towns, they were, in effect, friars. The new order was recognised in 1259, and solemnly approved by Pope Benedict XI in 1304. It remains one of twelve Mendicant orders in the Catholic Church.

The discipline of fervently practising humility had drawn Alexis into wandering as a mendicant. As a pious strategy to combat clerical corruption in those times, becoming a mendicant was a not uncommon spiritual development, Francis of Assisi and Saint Dominic having furnished but the most illustrious models only a generation earlier. Alexis sought alms for his brethren through the streets of the city where he had only lately been a prominent citizen. Like Anthony the Great, Benedict of Nursia and St Francis, Alexis never entered the priesthood.

Beyond preaching and his life of prayer, Alexis' principal endeavour was providing for the various religious communities where he lived. In 1252 a new church at Cafaggio was completed under his direction, with the financial assistance of his relative, Chiarissimo Falconieri. Under his influence, his niece Juliana Falconieri decided at a young age to follow the consecrated life.

Within a short time ten thousand people had enrolled in the Servite Order. Some of the first foundations were at Siena, Pistoia, Arezzo, Cafaggio, Prato (on the outskirts of Florence) and Lucca. Many parts of the world saw foundations established over the subsequent years. In the 19th century it reached England and USA (1874, see Our Lady of Sorrows Basilica). The order developed the three most common devotions to Our Lady of Sorrows. These are the Rosary of the Seven Sorrows, the Black Scapular of the Seven Dolours of Mary and the Novena to Our Sorrowful Mother.

Alexis died in Monte Senario at about 110 years of age on 17 February 1310. His entombed body and shrine is near the church of the Santissima Annunziata in Florence, which is served by the order. On 1 December 1717, pope Clement XI declared Falconieri worthy of veneration by the faithful. He extended the same honour to his six companions on 3 July 1725.

=== Amadeus of the Amidei ===
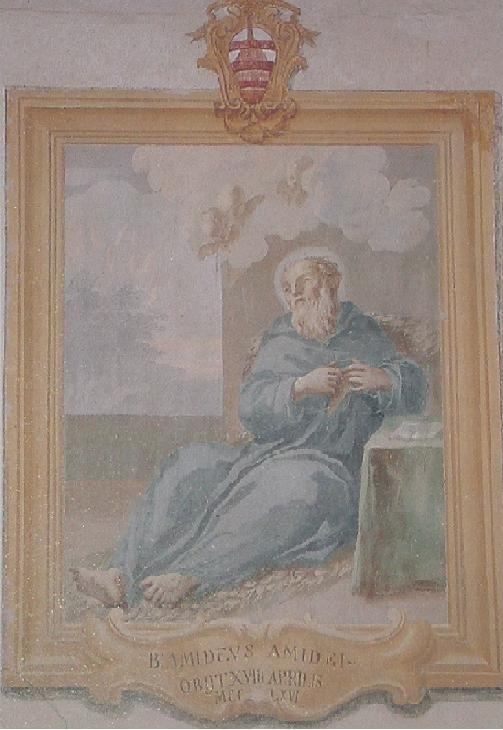
Fresco of Bartolomeus Amidei (Saint Amadeus degli Amidei)

One of the seven founders of the Servite Order in 1233, Amadeus of the Amidei (died 1265) was also known as Bartolomeo degli Amidei. He was born into the Amidei family in the Republic of Florence, and died at Monte Senario in 1265. With the other six, his feast day is on 17 February.

=== Hugh dei Lippi Ugguccioni ===
After following Philip Benizi to France and Germany, another founder, Hugh dei Lippi Ugguccioni remained there to serve as the vicar general. He died in Germany on 3 May 1282

== Legacy ==
Pope Leo XIII canonized the seven as a group on 15 January 1888. Their feast was inserted in the General Roman Calendar for celebration on 11 February, the anniversary of the granting of canonical approval to the order in 1304. Later in 1909, 11 February became the Feast of Our Lady of Lourdes, and so the Feast of the Seven Founders was moved to 12 February. In the 1969 revision of the calendar, 17 February was judged more appropriate as the dies natalis (i.e., heavenly birthday, or death anniversary) of Falconieri.

== Bibliography ==
- Holweck, F. G., A Biographical Dictionary of the Saints. St. Louis, MO: B. Herder Book Co., 1924.
