= Giovannangelo Porro =

Italian Roman Catholic priest and hermit

Blessed Giovannangelo Porro O.S.M.
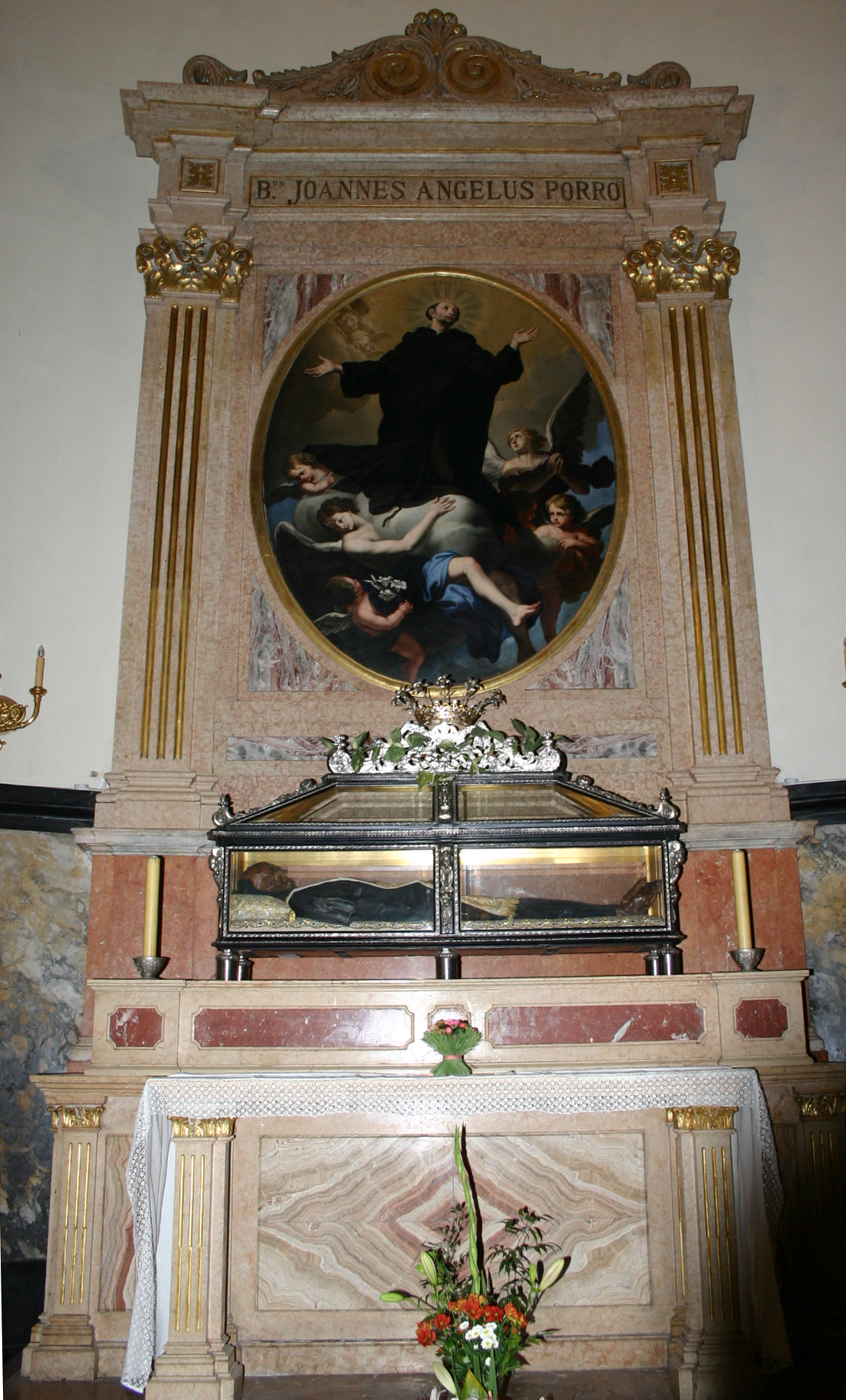

Priest
- Born: 1451; Seveso, Duchy of Milan
- Died: 23 October 1505 (aged 54); Milan, Duchy of Milan
- Venerated in: Roman Catholic Church
- Beatified: 15 July 1737, Saint Peter's Basilica, Papal States by Pope Clement XIII
- Major shrine: San Carlo al Corso, Italy
- Feast: 23 October
- Attributes: Servite habit
- Patronage: Sick children

Giovannangelo Porro (1451 - 23 October 1505) was an Italian Roman Catholic priest and hermit who hailed from the Milanese region and was a professed member of the Servites. Porro was born to nobles and became a priest after the death of his father. He remained a hermit in convents in places such as Florence and Milan where he dedicated his life to inward meditation and self-mortification until his death.

Charles Borromeo was healed as a child due to Porro's intercession and carried with him a foot bone fragment from Porro's incorrupt remains.

Porro was beatified in 1737 after Pope Clement XIII confirmed that there was an enduring and local 'cultus' - or popular veneration - to the late priest.

== Life ==
Giovannangelo Porro was born in 1451 in Seveso to the nobleman Protasio Porro and Franceschina as one of three male children.

The death of his father in 1468 prompted him to enter the Servite Order around this time while becoming a professed member on 20 December 1470. In the summer of 1474 he travelled to a convent in Florence where he was later ordained as a priest and he remained there until around 1477 when he went to the convent of Monte Senario to dedicate his time to meditation as well as the penitential practices of fasting and self-mortification - he would remain there for about two decades. Towards the end of 1488 the unwell Porro went to the Basilica of the Annunciation in Florence and after his recuperation spent a few months as a convent prior in Chianti. Porro returned to Milan in or around 1495 and remained for a brief period at the Cavacuta convent in Lodi. He became noted for his love of nature.

He died on 23 October 1505. His tomb became a place of pilgrimage where miracles were said to have occurred. One mother bought her ill son, Charles Borromeo, for a cure to his illness and he was cured. Borromeo removed a small bone from Porro's foot - he was incorrupt - and he carried it as a reminder of that cure.

== Beatification ==
His local 'cultus' - or popular devotion - seems to have been spontaneous at the time of his death but flourished after 1511. Pope Clement XII declared him Venerable in 1537; the cause for his beatification was opened on 11 June 1738, and Pope Clement XIII declared him Blessed on 23 December 1767.
