= Francesco Patrizi (disambiguation) =

Franciscus Patricius (Italian: Francesco Patrizi; 1529–1597) was a philosopher from Dalmatia.

Francesco Patrizi may also refer to:

- Francesco Patrizi (Servite) (1266–1328), priest and saint from Siena
- Francesco Patrizi (bishop) (1413–1492), Renaissance humanist and political theorist from Siena
