= San Carlo al Corso, Milan =

Church in Milan, Lombardy, Italy

Coordinates: 45°27′59″N 9°11′47″E

Church of Saint Charles Borromeo Chiesa di San Carlo al Corso
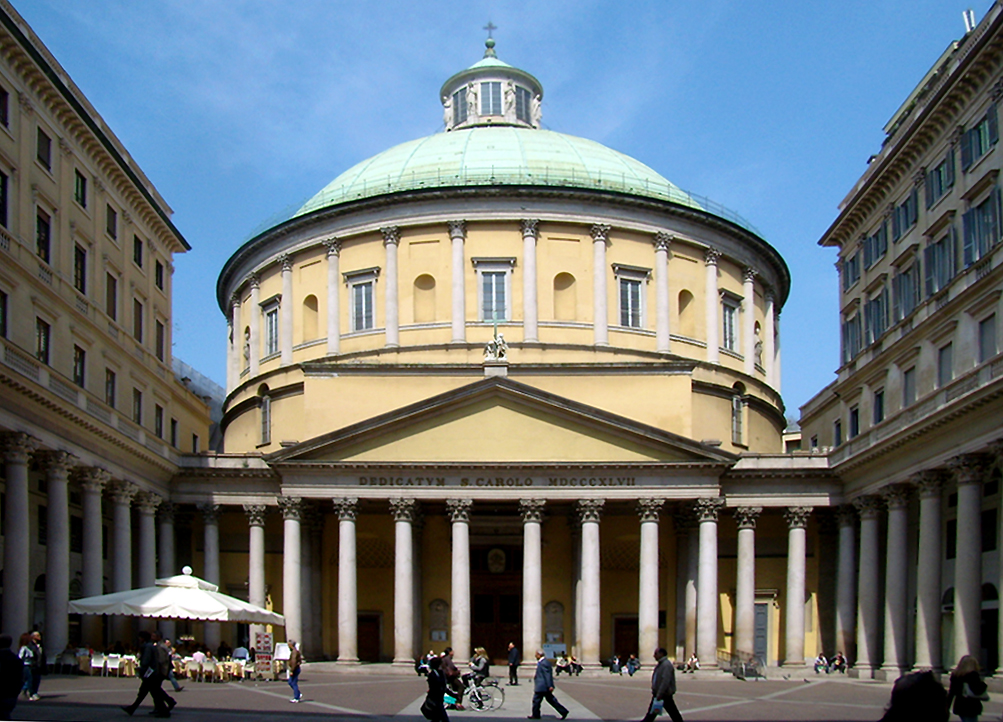
- Façade of the church.

Religion
- Affiliation: Roman Catholic
- Province: Milan
- Rite: Ambrosian Rite
- Year consecrated: 1847
- Status: Active

Location
- Location: Milan, Italy
- Interactive map of Church of Saint Charles Borromeo; Chiesa di San Carlo al Corso

Architecture
- Architects: Carlo Amati; Filippo Pizzagalli
- Type: Church
- Style: Neoclassical
- Groundbreaking: 1832
- Completed: 1847

San Carlo al Corso is a neoclassic style, Roman Catholic church located in the Piazza of San Carlo, just off Corso Vittorio Emanuele II, just west of the Piazza San Babila, in central Milan, region of Lombardy, Italy.

== History and decoration ==
The site of the present church was occupied by a monastic complex of the Servite Order, founded as early as 1290, and including the church of Santa Maria dei Servi. This church and monastery was frescoed by Fiammenghino, but in addition included works by Gian Paolo Lomazzo, Federico Macagni, and Daniele Crespi. The monastery was suppressed in 1799, during the Napoleonic occupation. The immediate neighborhood also had ancient small parish churches of San Pietro all Orto and San Giorgio alla Nocetta, or later San Giorgio Alamanno. In the 19th-century desires for modern urban planning motivated the municipality to desire to create a linear boulevard from the Piazza of the Duomo of Milan to the piazza San Babila. With the approval of the local parish provost Giacinto Amati (brother of the architect Carlo), it was decided to raze the ancient structures, and create a larger church dedicated to Milan's own Archbishop Saint Charles Borromeo. The new church was built in thanks for the ending of a recent cholera epidemic, and Archbishop Borromeo was admired in part for his work during the outbreak of bubonic plague in 1576 in Milan. Demolition of the cloister began in 1838. Thirty-thousand lire were spent by the municipality to purchase the property. Funds for the church required the collection of donations.

The church facade was designed in 1844 by Carlo Amati and was finished in 1847. One obvious model of the church was the Pantheon, Rome. Amati also designed the colonnade and portico around the piazza, which was intended to house commercial structures and stores. Flanking the main altar are two chapels, one dedicated to the Madonna of the Sorrrows (Virgine Addolorata) with its statue derived from Santa Maria dei Servi and the other dedicated to the blessed Giovanni Angelo Porro, with the altar from the prior church. Flanking the entrance are two chapels, one a baptistery and the other, a chapel of the Crucifix. In the apse ceiling is a fresco depicting the Glory of San Carlo before allegories of Faith, Hope and Charity by Angelo Inganni.

This church served as a model for the Chiesa Rotonda in San Bernardino, Switzerland, 1867. The prominent baroque basilica church of Sant'Ambrogio e Carlo al Corso is located on via del Corso in Rome, and was erected in the early 17th century. The prominent Neolassical church of San Francesco di Paola in the central Piazza del Plebiscito of Naples, also influenced by the Pantheon, had been started in 1816.

== See also ==
- San Carlo al Corso (Rome)
