= Joyce Rupp =

American Roman Catholic author and speaker

- Born: June 8, 1943 (age 83)
- Occupations: Writer, speaker
- Writing career
- Genres: Roman Catholic spirituality and poetry
- Website: joycerupp.com

Sister Joyce Rupp, O.S.M., is a Roman Catholic author and speaker. She is the co-director of The Institute of Compassionate Presence, a member of the Servite Order, and a volunteer for Hospice. Joyce has a Bachelor of Arts degree in English, a Master of Arts degree in Transpersonal Psychology, and a Master of Religious Education (MRE) degree. She lives in Des Moines, Iowa.

== Education ==
- BA in Elementary Education from Duchesne College in Omaha, Nebraska. 1965
- MRE from University of St. Thomas in Houston, Texas. 1975
- Studies in spirituality at Creighton University and the University of Notre Dame
- MTP from the Institute of Transpersonal Psychology, Palo Alto, California. 1993
- Studies in Jungian psychology at Naropa University in Boulder, Colorado, 1992–1994

== Biography ==
Joyce Rupp was born on June 8, 1943, the daughter of Hildegard A. Wilberding and Lester Rupp of Cherokee, Iowa. She grew up on a farm in Iowa as one of eight children. She attributes her family and the farm with her first experiences of God.

In 1962 she joined a religious Order known as the Servites or Servants of Mary and is a facilitator of the community’s ongoing spiritual growth program.

In 1973, as vocation director for the Archdiocese of Omaha, she began leading retreats for students and later for adults. She has traveled extensively, and her international retreats and conferences have taken her to Canada, Europe, New Zealand, Africa, Australia, and Asia.

In 1965 she received a BA in Elementary Education from Duchesne College in Omaha, Nebraska, and in 1975 she received her MRE from University of St. Thomas in Houston, Texas. After completing studies in spirituality at Creighton University and the University of Notre Dame, she earned a MTP from the Institute of Transpersonal Psychology, Palo Alto, California in 1993. She also studied Jungian psychology at Naropa University in Boulder, Colorado, from 1992 to 1994.

In 2008, along with Margaret Stratman, Rupp became a co-director of a new program called The Institute of Compassionate Presence. This innovative venture seeks to coach participants to bring to life their own innate compassion.

Rupp's many writing are informed not only by family and growing up on an Iowa farm but also by the tragic death of her brother in a drowning in 1969. She states, "The God I resonate with is the God of compassion... That was what I came to out of my brother's death: God is always with me in my suffering." Rupp's works have been translated into seven languages.

== Awards and notariety ==
Publishers Weekly named Rupp one of the best selling Catholic authors in the U.S in 1999.

In 2004, Rupp received the U.S. Catholic Award for Furthering the Cause of Women in the Church for her significant role as a “midwife” for women’s spirituality. She has also been a volunteer for hospice for 15 years.

Walk in a Relaxed Manner: Life Lessons on the Camino (Orbis, 2005) ISBN 978-1-57075-616-0 received first place awards, respectively, from The Catholic Press Association in 2006.

The Circle of Life by Joyce Rupp and Macrina Wiederkehr (Sorin Books, 2005) ISBN 978-1-893732-82-7 received an award for "One of the Best Spiritual Books of 2005" from Spirituality & Practice.

Open the Door (Ave Maria Press, 2008) ISBN 978-1-933495-14-9 received the Best 2008 Spiritual Books award from Spirituality & Practice.

In 2018, Rupp wrote Boundless Compassion which was awarded an award from the Catholic Press Association and the Association of Catholic Publishers.

The National Catholic Reporter called Rupp "one of today's top Catholic spirituality writers.

Vessels of Love: Prayers and Poems for the Later Years of Life (Orbis, 2024). Voted as one of the Best Books of 2024 by Spirituality and Practice Magazine, Winner of The Nautilus Book Awards, Silver Winner - Aging Consciously.

The Years of Ripening: Reflections on Aging in the Later Years won first prize for 2025 by the Catholic Media Association in the category of healing and self-help.

== Selected Writings ==
- The Circle of Life by Joyce Rupp and Macrina Wiederkehr (Sorin Books, 2005) ISBN 978-1-893732-82-7
- Walk in a Relaxed Manner: Life Lessons on the Camino (Orbis, 2005) ISBN 978-1-57075-616-0
- Open the Door (Ave Maria Press, 2008) ISBN 978-1-933495-14-9
- Praying Our Goodbyes (Ave Maria Press, 2012 ISBN 978-1-59471-205-0
- Vessels of Love: Prayers and Poems for the Later Years of Life (Orbis, 2024) ISBN 978-1-62698-592-6
- The Star in My Heart (Ave Maria, 2003)
- Prayers to Sophia (Ave Maria, 2003)
- The Cosmic Dance (Orbis, 2002)
- Inviting God In (Ave Maria, 2001)
- Out of the Ordinary (Ave Maria, 2000)
- Your Sorrow Is My Sorrow (Crossroad, 1999)
- May I Walk You Home (Ave Maria, 1999)
- The Cup of Our Life (Ave Maria, 1997)
- Dear Heart, Come Home (Crossroad, 1996)
- Little Pieces of Light (Paulist, 1994)
- May I Have This Dance? (Ave Maria, 1992)
- Fresh Bread (Ave Maria, 1985)
- Rest Your Dreams on a Little Twig (Sorin Books, 2003).
