= Antonio Maria Pucci =

Italian Roman Catholic saint

Saint Antonio Maria Pucci OSM
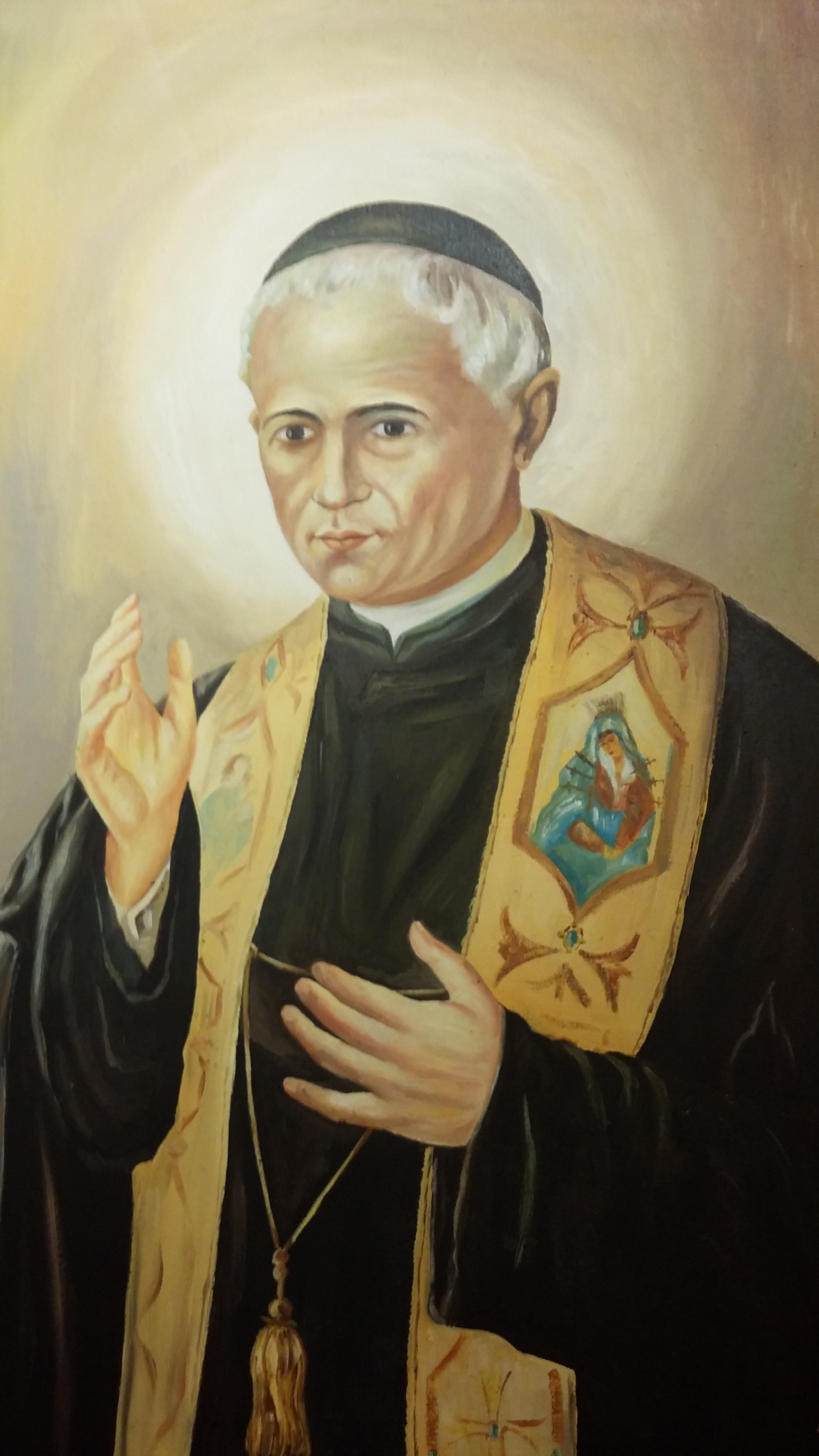
- Born: 16 April 1819; Vernio, Florence, Grand Duchy of Tuscany
- Died: 12 January 1892 (aged 72); Viareggio, Lucca, Kingdom of Italy
- Venerated in: Roman Catholic Church
- Beatified: 22 June 1952, Saint Peter's Basilica by Pope Pius XII
- Canonized: 9 December 1962, Saint Peter's Basilica by Pope John XXIII
- Feast: 12 January

Antonio Maria Pucci (16 April 1819 - 12 January 1892) - born Eustachio Pucci - was an Italian Roman Catholic priest and a professed member from the Servite Order.

He was beatified on 12 June 1952 under Pope Pius XII and was later made a saint on 9 December 1962 at the conclusion of the first session of the Second Vatican Council.

== Life ==
Eustace Pucci was born on 16 April 1819 to a poor sacristan as the second of seven children.

He felt called to life in a religious order in his childhood but his father opposed this despite his own service as a Church worker. Overcoming this opposition later allowed Eustace to enter the Servite Order in 1837 (at Santissima Annunziata) at which time he was given the religious name of "Antonio Maria". He was ordained to the priesthood in 1843 after having made his profession into the order a few months prior.

In 1843 he was assigned to serve in Viareggio at the parish church of Sant'Andrea and in 1846 was made its pastor. He went on to serve in the post for the next four decades until his death. He became known as il Curatino (the Little Parish Priest). He took geart care of the poor and the sick as well as the elderly. His labors were intensified by his response to two epidemics. In 1853 he founded a school for the education of children and in the same year found the Holy Childhood Society for educational purposes. He also took the initiative in founding the first seaside hostel for sick and poor children in Viareggio.

On 6 January 1892 he celebrated Mass in the parish for the feast of the Epiphany and that night went out during a storm to render assistance to a sick person. This led to him contracting pneumonia, Over the next days his condition worsened and on 12 January 1892 he died. He was buried locally. On 18 April 1920 his remains were relocated inside the church of Sant'Andrea.

== Sainthood ==
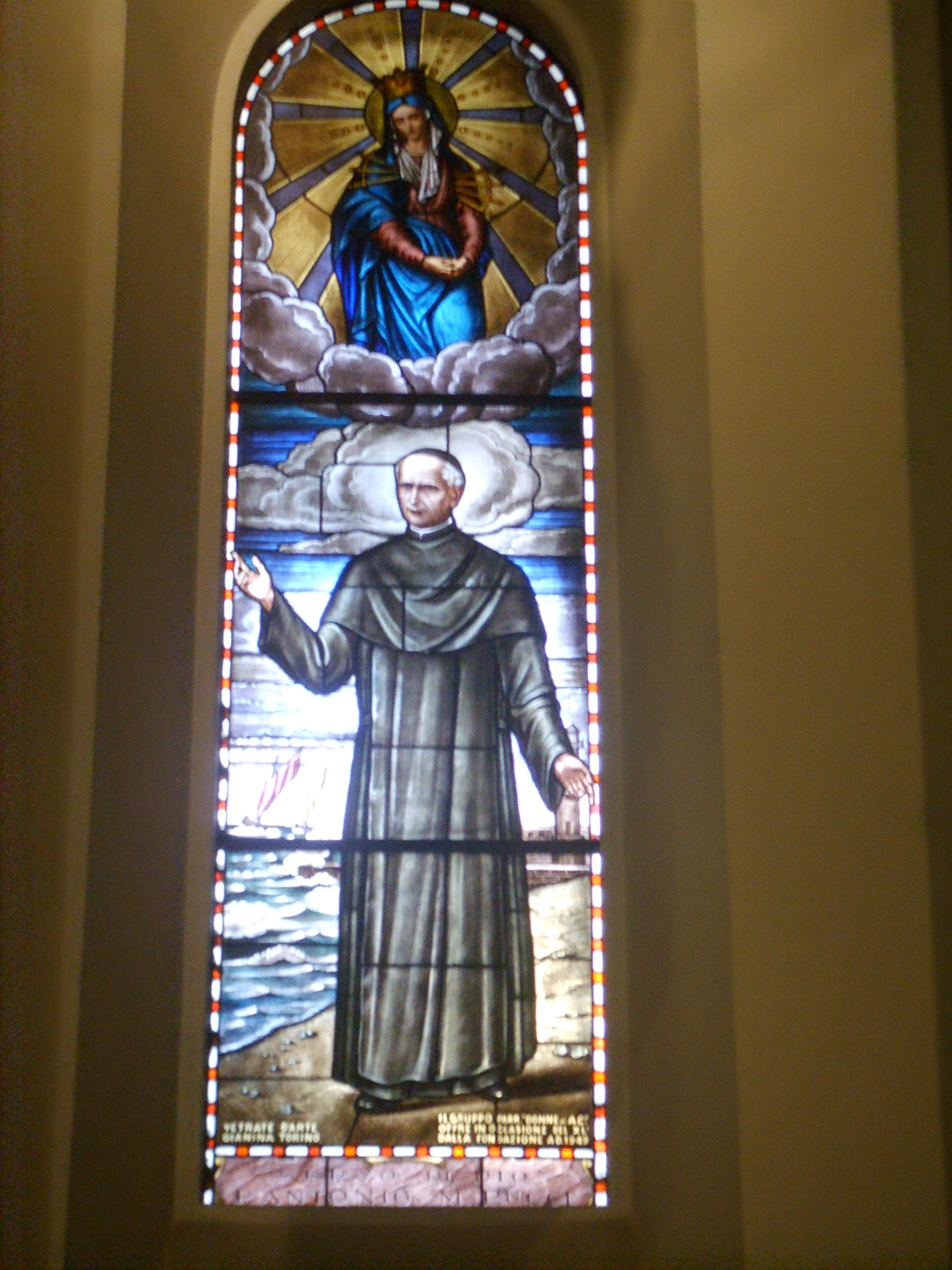
Stained glass window of Saint Antonio Maria Pucci in Viareggio

He was proclaimed a Servant of God on 13 April 1932 under Pope Pius XI with the introduction of his sainthood cause and he was later made Venerable on 18 January 1948 upon the confirmation of his life of heroic virtue. Pope Pius XII beatified him on 22 June 1952 while Pope John XXIII canonized him on 9 December 1962.

== Sources ==
- Calabuig I. M. (editor), Sant'Antonio Maria Pucci, Facoltà Teologica Marianum, 2004
- Antonio Maria Pucci, Epistolario di s. Antonio M. Pucci osm (1847-1891), Vol. 1: 1847-1883, Facoltà Teologica Marianum, 2001
- Antonio Maria Pucci, Epistolario di s. Antonio M. Pucci osm, Vol. 2: 1883-1891, Facoltà Teologica Marianum, 2006
- Peretto E. (editor), Storia e profezia nella memoria di un frate santo. Atti del Convegno di studio nel primo centenario della morte di s. Antonio Pucci (Roma, 14-16 ottobre 1992), Facoltà Teologica Marianum, 1994
