= Servite Order =

Roman Catholic religious institute

Order of Friar Servants of Mary
- Latin: Ordo Servorum Beatae Mariae Virginis
- Abbreviation: OSM
- Formation: 15 August 1233 at Santissima Annunziata Basilica, Florence, Italy
- Type: Mendicant order Marian devotional society
- Headquarters: General Curia House San Marcello al Corso, Rome, Italy
- Website: servidimaria.net

The Servite Order, officially known as the Order of Servants of Mary (Latin: Ordo Servorum Beatae Mariae Virginis; abbreviated OSM), is one of the five original mendicant orders in the Catholic Church. Started by the Seven Holy Founders in 1233, it includes several branches of friars (priests and brothers), contemplative nuns, a congregation of religious sisters, and lay groups. The order's objectives are the sanctification of its members, the preaching of the Gospel, and the propagation of devotion to the Mother of God, with special reference to her sorrows.

== History ==
=== Foundation ===
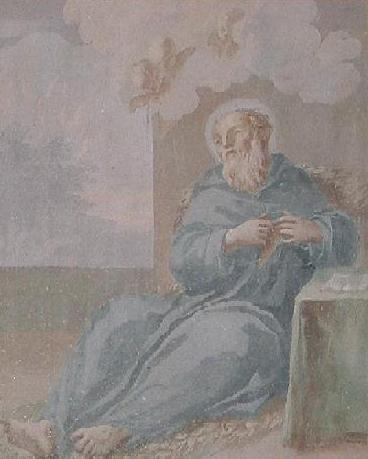
Amadeus of the Amidei (d. 1266), one of the seven founders of the Servite Order.

The order was founded in 1233 by "the seven holy founders", each a member of a patrician family of Florence, Italy. These cloth merchants left their city, families, and professions and withdrew to Monte Senario, a mountain outside the city of Florence, for a life of poverty and penance. The seven were: Bonfilius of Florence, born Bonfilius Monaldi (Buonfiglio dei Monaldi); Alexis of Florence, born Alexis Falconieri (Italian: Alessio Falconieri) (1200 – 17 February 1310); Manettus of Florence, born Benedict dell'Antella (Benedetto dell' Antella); Amideus of Florence, born Bartholemew Amidei (died 1266) (also known as Bartolomeo degli Amidei); Hugh of Florence, born Ricovero Uguccioni (Hugh dei Lippi Uggucioni (Ricovero dei Lippi-Ugguccioni)); Sostene of Florence, born Gerardino Sostegni (Gherardino di Sostegno); and Buonagiunta of Florence, born John Manetti (Giovanni di Buonagiunta (Bonajuncta)). They were canonized by Pope Leo XIII on 15 January 1888.

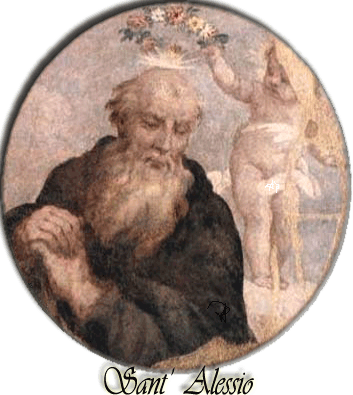
Alexis Falconieri (d. 1310), one of the seven founders of the Servite Order.

The members of the order dedicated themselves to Mary under her title of Mother of Sorrows (Italian: Madonna Addolorata). Dedicating their devotion to the mother of Jesus, they adopted Mary's virtues of hospitality and compassion as the order's hallmarks. The distinctive spirit of the order is the sanctification of its members by meditation on the Passion of Jesus and the Sorrows of the Virgin Mary, and spreading abroad this devotion.

The Bishop of Florence, Ardengo Trotti (Ardengo Dei Foraboschi), approved the group as a religious order sometime between 1240 and 1247. The Servites, like other new orders before them such as the Trinitarians and the Dominicans, decided to live by the ancient Rule of St. Augustine, and added to the rule further guidelines that were the expression of their own Marian devotion and dedication. By 1250 a number of Servites had been ordained to the priesthood, thus creating an order with priests as well as brothers.

Pope Alexander IV favored a plan for the amalgamation of all orders which followed the Rule of St. Augustine. This was accomplished in March 1256, but about the same time a rescript was issued confirming the Servite Order as a separate body with power to elect a general. Four years later a general chapter was convened at which the order was divided into two provinces, Tuscany and Umbria, the former being governed by Manettus and the latter by Sostene. Within five years two new provinces were added, that of Romagna and that of Lombardy.

=== Centuries of growth ===
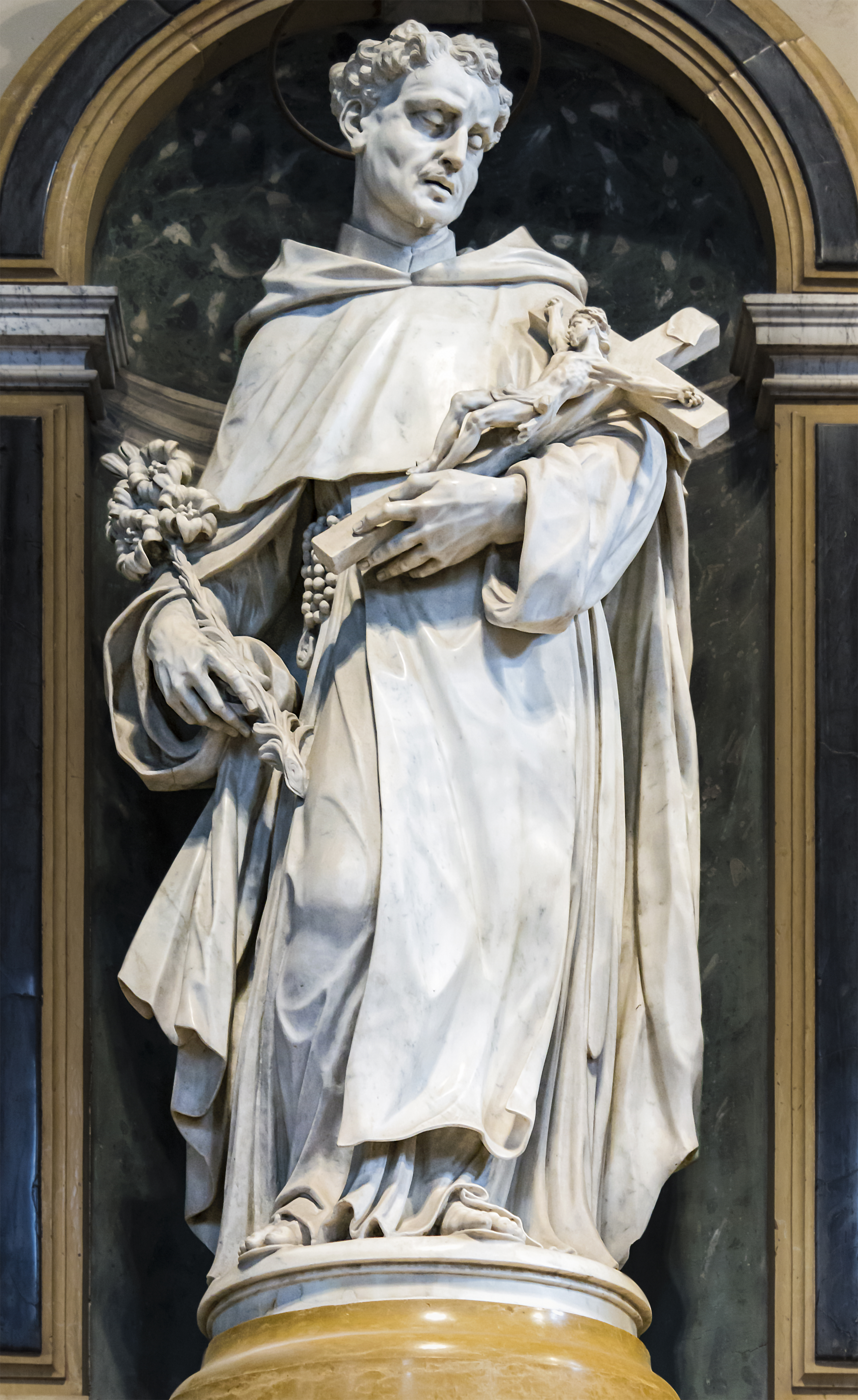
Philip Benizi de Damiani (1233–1285)

Philip Benizi was elected general on 5 June 1267, and afterwards became the great propagator of the order. The Second Council of Lyons in 1274 put into execution the ordinance of the 1215 Fourth Lateran Council, forbidding the foundation of new religious orders, and suppressed all mendicant institutions not yet approved by the Holy See. In the year 1276 Pope Innocent V in a letter to Benizi declared the order suppressed. Benizi set off for Rome to appeal the decision, but before his arrival there Innocent V had died. His successor lived only five weeks. Finally Pope John XXI, decided that the Servite Order should continue as before. It was not definitively approved until Pope Benedict XI issued the bull "Dum levamus" on 11 February 1304. Of the seven founders, Alexis alone lived to see their foundation raised to the permanent dignity of an order. He died in 1310.

On 30 January 1398 Pope Boniface IX granted the Servites the power to confer theological degrees. It was in harmony with the tradition thus established that many centuries later the order established the Marianum faculty in Rome.

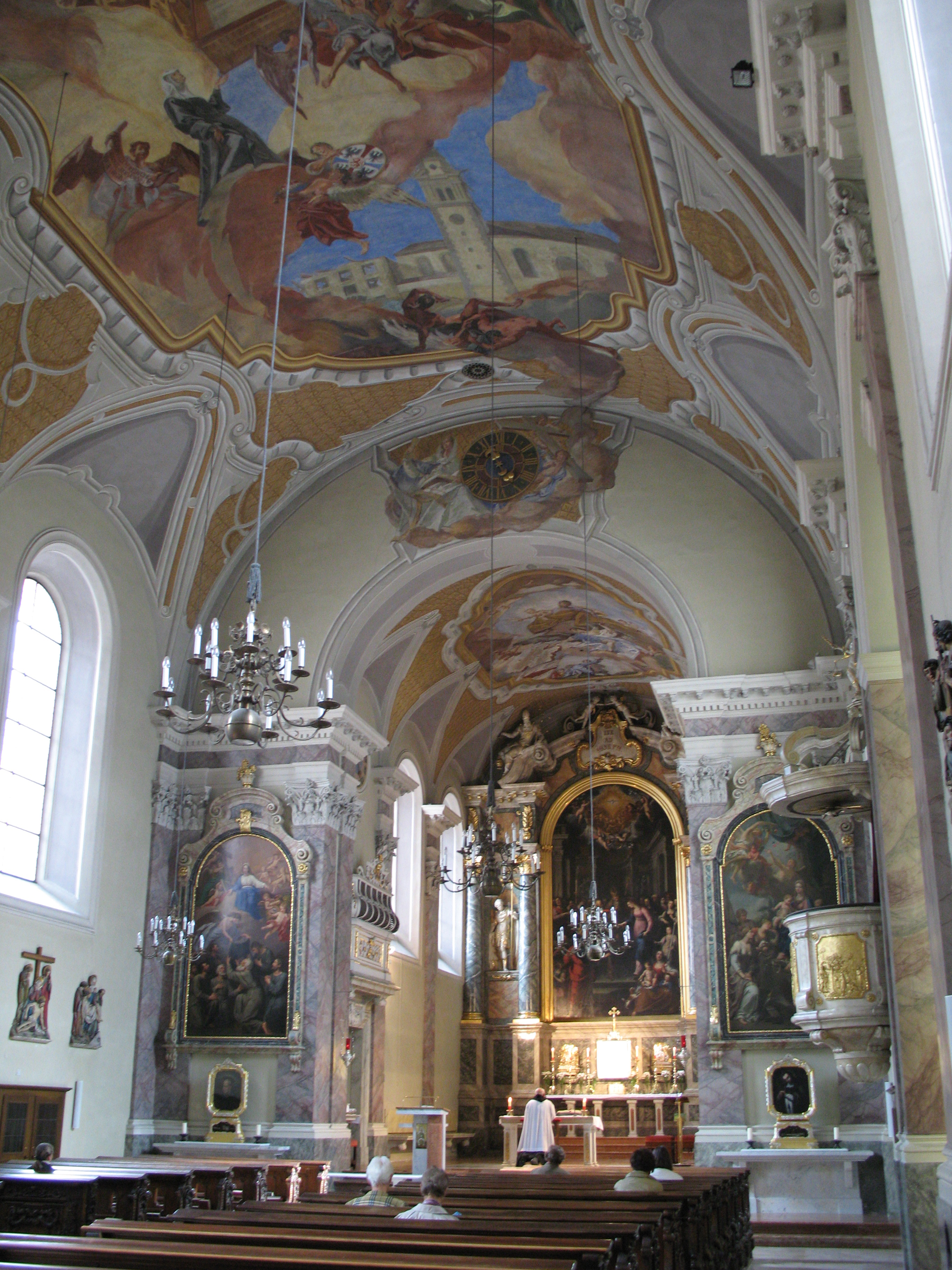
Servite church in Innsbruck, Austria

The new foundation enjoyed considerable growth in the following decades. Already in the thirteenth century there were houses of the order in Germany, France, and Spain. By the early years of the fourteenth century the order had more than one hundred houses in locations including Hungary, Bohemia, Austria, Poland, and what later became Belgium. In subsequent periods came missions in Crete, the Philippines (St. Peregrine-Philippine Vicariate), and India.

=== European contraction ===
The disturbances which arose during the Protestant Reformation caused the loss of many Servite houses in Germany, but in the south of France the order met with much success. The Convent of San Marcello al Corso was founded in the city of Rome in 1369 and a second house, Santa Maria in Via, was established there in 1513. Beginning in the early part of the eighteenth century the order sustained a series of losses and confiscations from which it has yet to recover. A first blow fell upon the flourishing Province of Narbonne, which was almost totally destroyed by the plague which swept Marseille in 1720. Thanks to secularizing inroads made by the Enlightenment, in 1783 the Servites were expelled from Prague and in 1785 the Emperor Joseph II desecrated the shrine of Maria Waldrast. The French Revolution and ensuing hostilities throughout western Europe caused widespread losses. Ten houses were suppressed in Spain in 1835.

After the seizure of Rome under the Italian Risorgimento in 1870, the government of Italy closed the Servite house of studies in the city, along with many other papal institutions. The institute was re-founded as the College of Sant Alessio Falcioneri in 1895.

=== New expansion ===
After a gap of 25 years, in 1895 the house of studies in Rome was re-founded as the College of Sant Alessio Falcioneri. This development went hand in hand at this period with other initiatives and a new foundation was made at Brussels in 1891 and the order was introduced into England and the United States, chiefly through the efforts of the Servite Frs Bosio and Morini. The latter, having gone to London in 1864 as director of the affiliated Congregation of the Sisters of Compassion, obtained charge of a parish from Archbishop Manning in 1867. The work prospered and besides St. Mary's Priory in London, convents were opened at Bognor Regis (1882) and Begbroke (1886). In 1870 Frs Morini, Ventura, Giribaldi, and Joseph Camera, at the request of Bishop Joseph Melcher of Green Bay, Wisconsin, took up a mission in America, at Neenah. Fr Morini founded at Chicago (1874) the monastery of Our Lady of Sorrows. A novitiate was opened at Granville, Wisconsin in 1892 and an American province was formally established in 1908.

=== Twentieth century ===
The order continued to expand geographically throughout the twentieth century, taking responsibility for missions in Swaziland in 1913, Acre in Brazil in 1919, Aisén in Chile in 1937, and Zululand in South Africa. It also made foundations in Argentina from 1914 and more solidly since 1921; Transvaal in South Africa from 1935, Uruguay in 1939, Bolivia in 1946, Mexico in 1948, Australia in 1951, Venezuela in 1952, Colombia in 1953, India in 1974, Mozambique in 1984, Philippines in 1985, Uganda, Albania in 1993, and also the refoundations in Hungary (Eger) and the Czech Republic. In the United States there is currently one province of friars with headquarters in Chicago. There are four provinces of sisters with motherhouses in Wisconsin, Nebraska, and two in Illinois.

Pope Pius XII, through the Congregation of Seminaries and Universities, elevated the Marianum to a pontifical theological faculty on 30 November 1950.

After the Second Vatican Council, the order renewed its Constitutions starting with its 1968 general chapter at Majadahonda, Madrid, a process which was concluded in 1987. In the same year, Prior General Michael M. Sincerny oversaw the creation of the International Union of the Servite Family (UNIFAS).

The twentieth century also saw the beatification (1952) and the canonization of Friar Antonio Maria Pucci; the canonization of Clelia Barbieri (d. 1870), foundress of the Minime dell’Addolorata; the beatification in 1999 of Ferdinando Maria Baccilieri of the Servite Secular Order; the beatification in 2001 of Maria Guadalupe Ricart Olmos, a Spanish cloistered nun who was martyred during the Spanish Civil War; and the beatification of Cecelia Eusepi of the Servite Secular Order.

Through the centuries, the Servite Order has spread throughout the world, including all of Europe, parts of Africa, Australia, the Americas, India, and the Philippines. The general headquarters of the Servite Order is in Rome, while many provinces and motherhouses represent the order throughout the world.

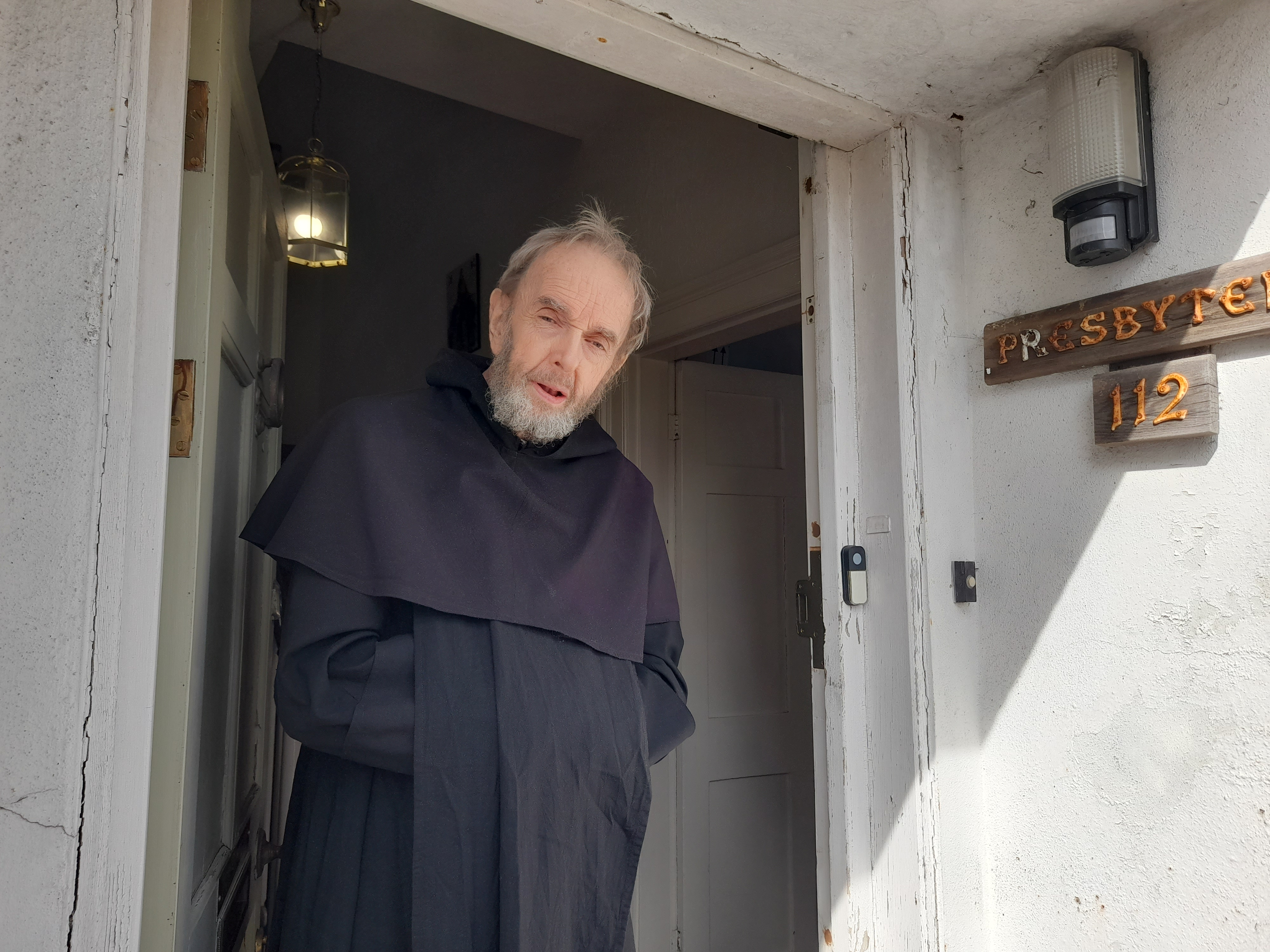
Father Bill O.S.M. at St Peter & St Paul, Combe Down, Bath. Former university chaplain.

=== Twenty-first century ===
Allegations of sexual assault on children by members of the Servite order surfaced in several jurisdictions in court filings, accompanied by demands for more transparency.

== Devotions, manner of life ==
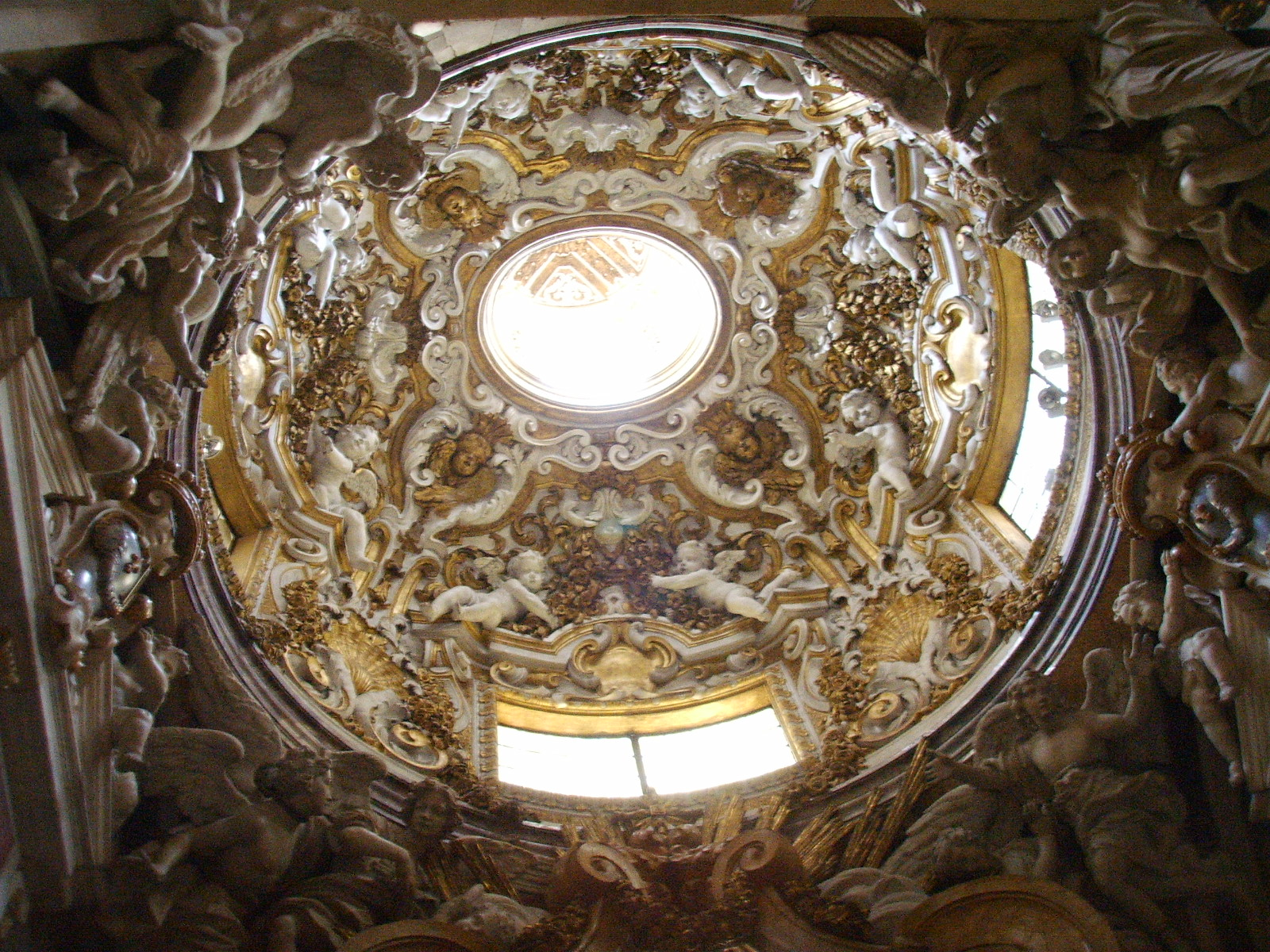
Ceiling in the Servite mother church, Santissima Annunziata, Florence

In common with all religious orders strictly so called, the Servites make solemn vows of poverty, chastity, and obedience. The particular object of the order is to sanctify first its own members, and then all humankind through devotion to the Mother of God, especially in her desolation during the Passion of her Divine Son.

All offices in the order are elective and continue for three years, except that of general and assistant-generals which are for six years.

The Servites give missions, have the care of souls, or teach in higher institutions of learning. The Rosary of the Seven Sorrows is one of their devotions, as is also the Via Matris.

Canonized Servite saints are: Philip Benizi (feast day on 23 August), Peregrine Laziosi (4 May), Juliana Falconieri (19 June). The seven founders of the order were canonized in 1888, and have a common feast day on 17 February. The date first assigned to this feast day was 11 February, the anniversary of the canonical approval of the order in 1304. Since in 1907 this date was assigned to the celebration of Our Lady of Lourdes, the feast day of the Seven Holy Founders was moved to 12 February. The date was changed again in 1969 to accord more closely with liturgical tradition, to a date which marks the anniversary of the death of one of them, Saint Alexis Falconieri, which occurred on 17 February 1310.

== Affiliated bodies ==
=== Second Order ===
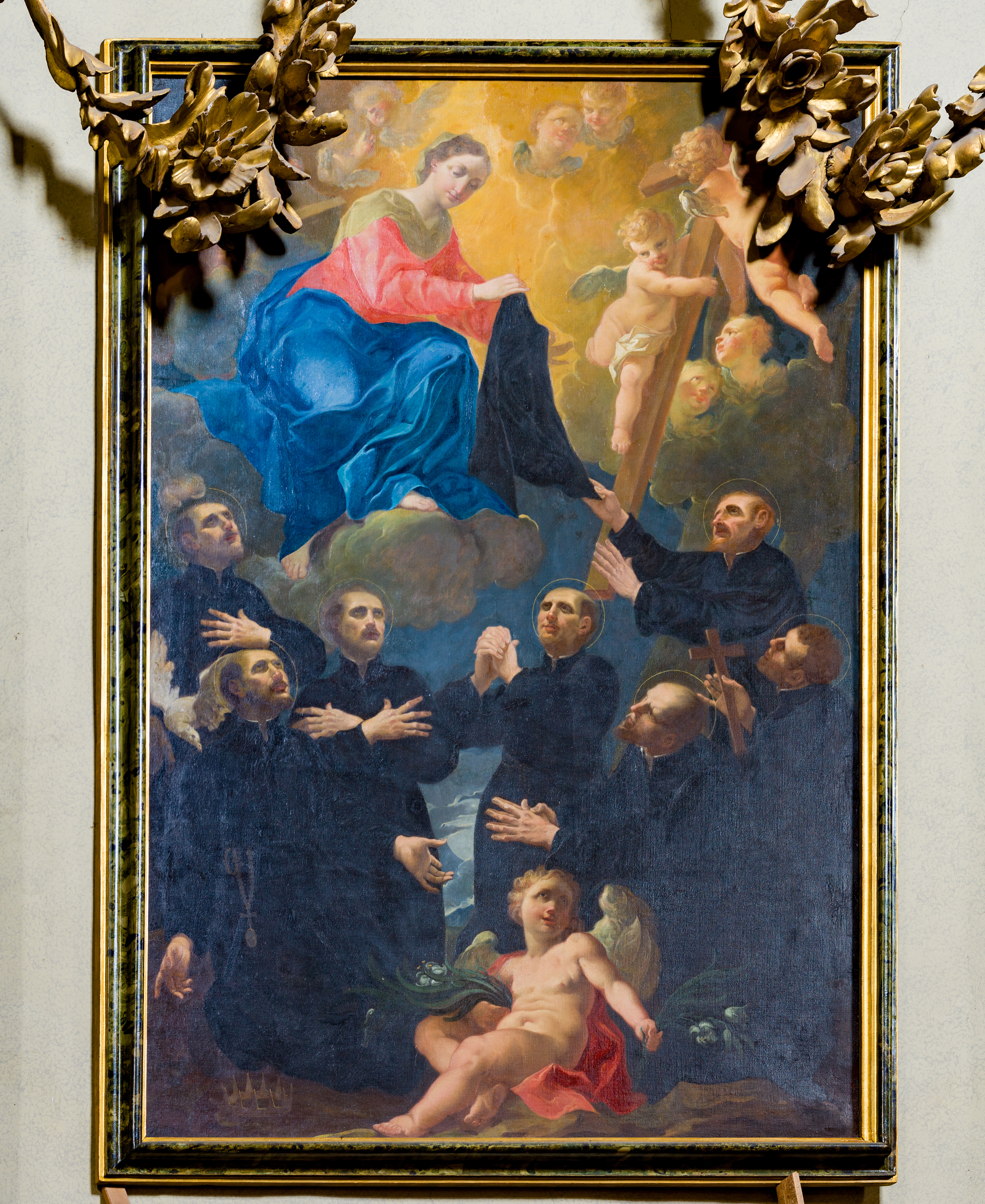
The Virgin Mary and the Seven Founders of the Servite Order by Giuseppe Tortelli in Sant'Alessandro in Brescia.

Connected with the first order of men are the cloistered nuns of the second order, which originated with converts of Philip Benizi. These nuns currently have convents in Spain, Italy, England, the Tyrol, and Germany.

=== Mantellate Sisters ===
The Mantellate Sisters are a third order congregation of religious women founded by Juliana Falconieri, to whom St Philip Benizi gave the habit in 1284. From Italy it spread into other countries of Europe. Anna Juliana, Archduchess of Austria, founded several houses and became a Mantellate herself.

In 1844 the congregation was introduced into France, and from there extended into England in 1850. The sisters were the first to wear the religious habit publicly in that country after the Protestant Reformation and were active missionaries under Frederick William Faber and the Oratorians for many years. This branch occupies itself with active works. They devote themselves principally to the education of youth, managing academies and taking charge of parochial schools. They also undertake works of mercy, such as the care of orphans, visiting the sick, and instructing converts. Organized into a number of religious congregations, some of pontifical and some of diocesan right, they have houses in Italy, France, Spain, England, and Canada. In the United States they are to be found in the dioceses of Sioux City, Omaha, Charlotte NC, and Chicago. The Congregation first arrived in Africa in 1922.

=== Servite Secular Order ===
The Secular Order of the Servants of Mary (Servite Secular Order) is an approved Catholic organization of lay men and women plus diocesan priests living their Christian faith in the context of the world. They strive toward holiness according to the spirituality of the Servite Order, following the directives of their Rule of Life. Secular Servites are asked to do the following each day: live the Christian virtues of faith, hope, and love; pray and try to read Sacred Scripture each day, and/or the Liturgy of the Hours; and practice acts of reverence for the Mother of God daily, especially by praying the Servite prayer "The Vigil of Our Lady" and/or the Servite Rosary of the Seven Sorrows of Mary.

There is also a confraternity of the Seven Dolours, branches of which may be erected in any church.

== Mariology and the Marianum ==
The pontifical theological faculty Marianum, which is now one of the leading centers of Mariology, was established by the Servite Order in accord with its tradition of many centuries. In 1398 Pope Boniface IX granted the order the right to confer theological degrees. Suppressed by the Kingdom of Italy in 1870, it was reopened in 1895 under the name of Sant'Alessio Falconeri.

In 1939 the Servite priest Gabriel Roschini founded the journal Marianum and directed it for its first thirty years, establishing it as a respected international specialist journal which is still successfully published by the Marianum theological faculty.

In 1950 Roschini was also instrumental in the reorganization of the Servite house of studies in Rome as the Marianum theological faculty, which, on 8 December 1955 became a pontifical faculty in virtue of the decree Coelesti Honorandae Reginae of the Sacred Congregation of Seminaries and Universities under the authority of Pope Pius XII. Its particular speciality is the study of the theology and history of the Blessed Virgin Mary and of her veneration in the church.

== Saints, Blesseds, and other holy people ==
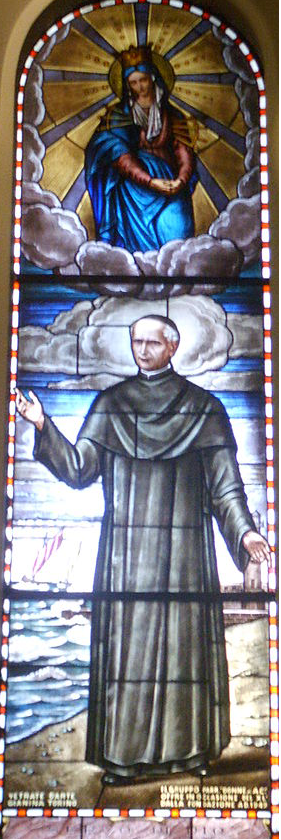
Antonio Maria Pucci (1819–1892)

Saints

- Bonfilio dei Monaldi da Firenze (died 1 January 1262), one of the founders of the Order, canonized on 15 January 1888
- Amadio degli Amidei da Firenze (died 18 April 1266), one of the founders of the Order, canonized on 15 January 1888
- Bonagiunta Manetti de Firenze (died 31 August 1267), one of the founders of the Order, canonized on 15 January 1888
- Manetto dell'Antella da Firenze (died 20 August 1268), one of the founders of the Order, canonized on 15 January 1888
- Ugoccione Uguccioni da Firenze (died 3 May 1282), one of the founders of the Order, canonized on 15 January 1888
- Sostegno Sostegni da Firenze (died 3 May 1282), one of the founders of the Order, canonized on 15 January 1888
- Filippo Benizzi de Damiani (15 August 1233 – 22 August 1285), prior general, canonized on 12 April 1671
- Alessio Falconieri da Firenze (c. 1200 – 17 February 1310), one of the founders of the Order, canonized on 15 January 1888
- Giuliana Falconieri (c. 1270 – 19 June 1341), founder of the Third Order of Servites, canonized on 16 June 1737
- Pellegrino Laziosi (1 November 1260 – 1 May 1345), priest and confessor, canonized on 27 December 1726
- Antonio Maria Pucci (16 April 1819 - 12 January 1892), priest, canonized on 9 December 1962

Blesseds

- Gioacchino Piccolomini (c. 1258 – 10 April 1305), tertiary, beatified on 21 March 1609
- Giacomo Villa "l'Elemosiniere" ("the Almsgiver") (c. 1260/1270 - 15 January 1312), martyr, beatified on 17 May 1806
- Ubaldo Adimari da Borgo San Sepolcro (c. 1245 - 9 April 1315), professed religious, beatified on 3 April 1821
- Andrea Dotti di Sansepolcro (c. 1256 - 31 August 1315), priest, beatified on 29 November 1806
- Bonaventura Bonaccorsi da Pistoia (died 14 December 1315), priest, beatified on 23 April 1822
- Francesco Patrizi da Siena (c. 1263 – 12 or 26 May 1328), peacemaker, beatified on 11 September 1743
- Tommaso Corsini da Orvieto (c. 1300 - c. 1343), professed religious, beatified on 10 December 1768
- Giovanna Soderini da Firenze (c. 1301 - 1 September 1367), professed religious, beatified on 10 October 1828
- Benincasa da Montepulciano (c. 1375 - 9 May 1426), professed religious, beatified on 23 December 1829
- Girolamo Ranuzzi da Sant’Angelo in Vado (c. 1410 - c. 1468), priest, beatified on 1 April 1775
- Elisabetta Picenardi da Mantova (c. 1428 – 19 February 1468), tertiary, beatified on 10 November 1804
- Andrea (Giacomo Filippo) Bertoni (c. 1454 - 25 May 1483), priest, beatified on 22 July 1761
- Bonaventura Tornielli (c. 1411 - 31 March 1491), priest, beatified on 6 September 1911
- Giovannangelo (Giovanni Angelo) Porro (c. 1451 - 23 October 1505), hermit, beatified on 15 July 1737
- Ferdinando Maria Baccilieri (14 May 1821 - 13 July 1893), priest, Secular Servite, and founder of the Sisters Servants of Mary of Galeazza, beatified on 3 October 1999
- Cecilia Eusepi (17 February 1910 - 1 October 1928), Secular Servite, beatified on 17 June 2012
- María Francisca (María Guadalupe) Ricart Olmos (23 February 1881 – 2 October 1936), nun martyred during the Spanish Civil War, beatified on 11 March 2001

Declared Blessed by popular acclaim

- Tommaso Vitali (c. 1425 - 21 December 1490), professed religious from the Archdiocese of Pesaro
- Piriteo Malvezzi da Bologna (died 4 September 1495), martyr
- Paolo (Cozzando) Bigoni (c. 1400 - c. 1503 or c. 1409 - c. 1510), professed religious from the Archdiocese of Pesaro
- Pietro della Croce (c. 1486 – 6 July 1522), friar of German origin who cured the citizens of Viterbo from a plague in 1522
- Lucia da Verona (c. 1514 - c. 1574), tertiary

Cultus suspended

- Agostino Cennini, Bartolomeo Donati, Lorenzo Nerucci, Giovanni Battista Petrucci and 60 Companions (died c. 1420), martyred by the Hussite heresy in Prague, beatified on 25 June 1918, but because of historical uncertainties regarding the alleged martyrdom of these friars (moreover, only four names were recovered), the cult was suspended during the pontificate of Pope Pius XI.

Venerables

- Giacinta Gertrude (Maria Luisa) Maurizi (27 September 1770 - 9 May 1831), nun, declared Venerable on 7 July 1977
- Giuseppe Bedetti (23 July 1799 - 4 January 1889), priest and Secular Servite, declared Venerable on 16 November 1985
- Antonio (Gioacchino Maria) Stevan (18 November 1921 - 28 April 1949), novice, declared Venerable on 8 March 1997
- Dino (Bernardino Maria) Piccinelli (24 January 1905 - 1 October 1984), Titular Bishop of Gaudiaba; Auxiliary Bishop of Ancona, declared Venerable on 21 December 2020

Servants of God

- Carlo Amirante (3 September 1852 - 20 January 1934), priest and Secular Servite
- Giuseppe (Gioachino Maria) Rossetto (8 June 1880 - 11 June 1935), priest of the order and founder of Sacerdotal Union of Saint Raphael the Archangel and Secular Institute of Saint Raphael the Archangel, declared Servant of God on 21 April 1995
- Caterina Quaranta (Maria Teresa of Jesus in the Blessed Sacrament) (8 March 1883 - 23 January 1954), nun
- Vincenzo (Egidio Maria) Moscini (4 February 1884 - 25 August 1976), priest
- Carlo (Andrea Maria) Cecchin (22 October 1914 - 15 September 1995), priest, declared Servant of God on 13 February 2002
- Rafael (Ignacio María) Calabuig Adán (4 March 1931 - 6 February 2005), priest
- Luigi Maria Ricci (23 September 1918 - 31 January 2015), priest, declared Servant of God on 30 April 2024
- Paolino Maria Baldassari (2 April 1926 - 2 April 2016), priest, declared Servant of God in 2022

== Other notable Servites ==
Several of the most distinguished Servites are here grouped under the heading of that particular subject to which they were especially devoted; the dates are those of their death.

- Cardinals: Alexis Lépicier (1936), also a former Prior General of the order, theologian and papal diplomat
- Sacred scripture: Giovanni Angelo Montorsoli (1600), commentary in five volumes.
- Theology: Gabriel Roschini (1924).
- History and hagiography: Raphael Maffei (1577); Paolo Sarpi (1623); Philip Ferrari (1626); Peregrine Soulier (19th c.).
- Painters: Giovanni Angelo Montorsoli (Angelus Montursius) (1563), architect and sculptor, among whose works are the Neptune of Messina, the arm of Laocoon in the Vatican, and the Angels on the Ponte Sant'Angelo.
- Healing: International Compassion Ministry: Peter Mary Rookey (2014), Canticle Of Love and Miracle Prayer. Joyce Rupp, co-director of The Institute of Compassionate Presence and hospice volunteer is also a prolific author. The National Catholic Reporter called Rupp "one of today's top spirituality writers.

== Institutions and schools ==
- Collège Servite, Ayer's Cliff, Quebec, Canada
- Our Lady's Catholic High School, Stamford Hill, London, United Kingdom
- Servite College, Perth, Australia
- Servite High School, Anaheim, California, United States
- Seven Holy Founders Elementary School, St. Louis, Missouri, United States
- Marianum College, Tunasan, Muntinlupa, Metro Manila, Philippines founded 2002

== Distinctions ==
In December 2023, the Secular Order of the Servants of Mary received the International Award "Leonardo The Immortal Light", conferred by the International Committee Leonardo da Vinci. The recognition highlighted the historical role of the Order, founded in 1233, as one of the significant patrons of major Italian artists throughout the centuries.

== Gallery of Servite churches ==
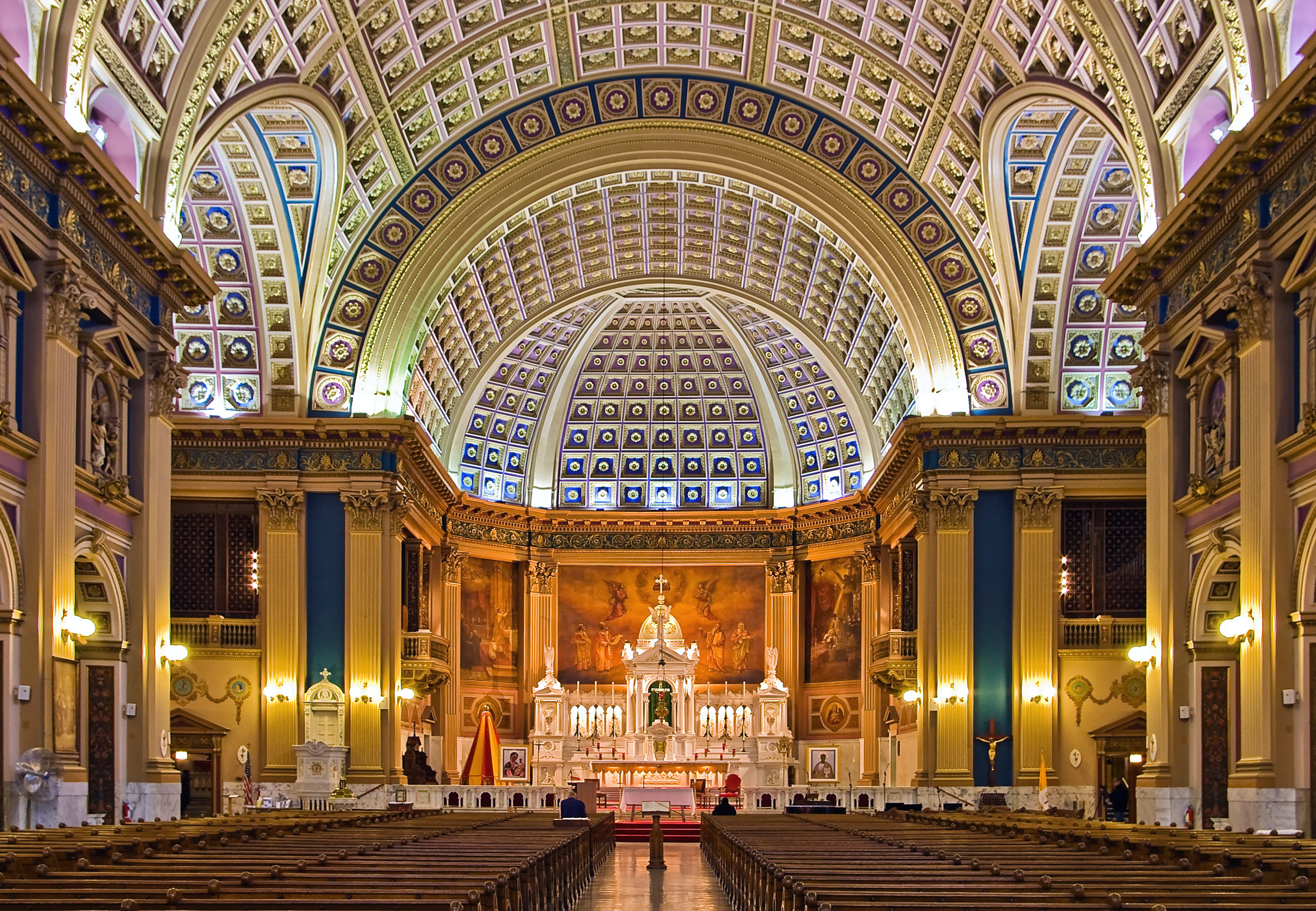
Our Lady of Sorrows Basilica, Chicago, 1874

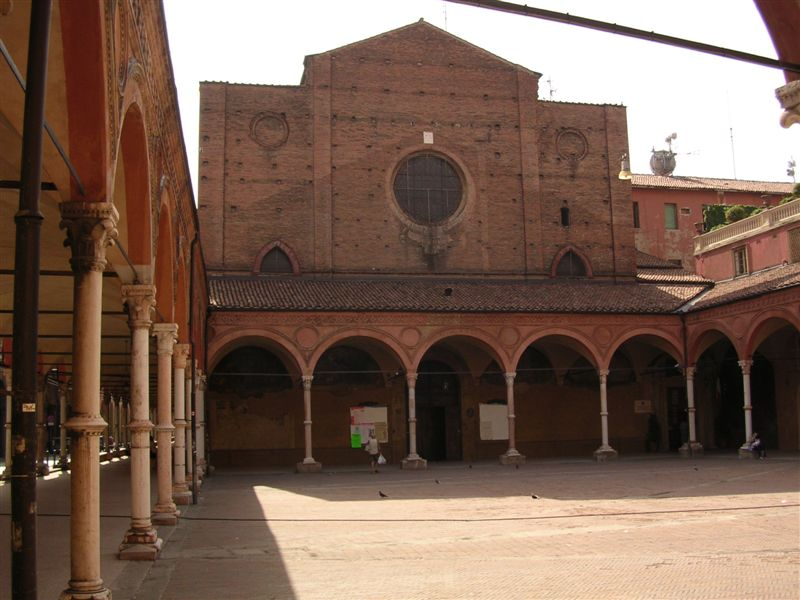
Santa Maria dei Servi, Bologna, Italy

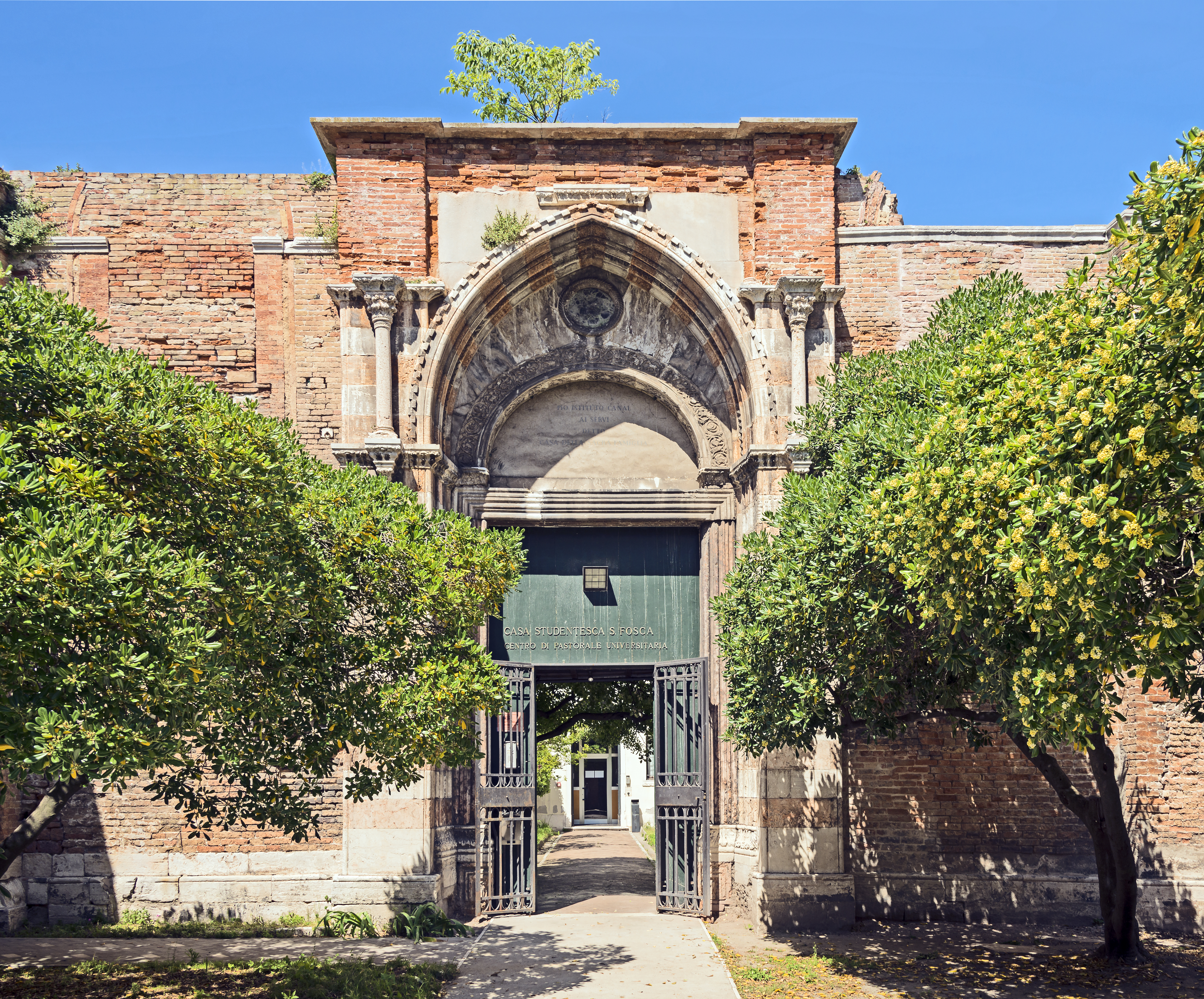
Chiesa dei Servi, Venice, Italy

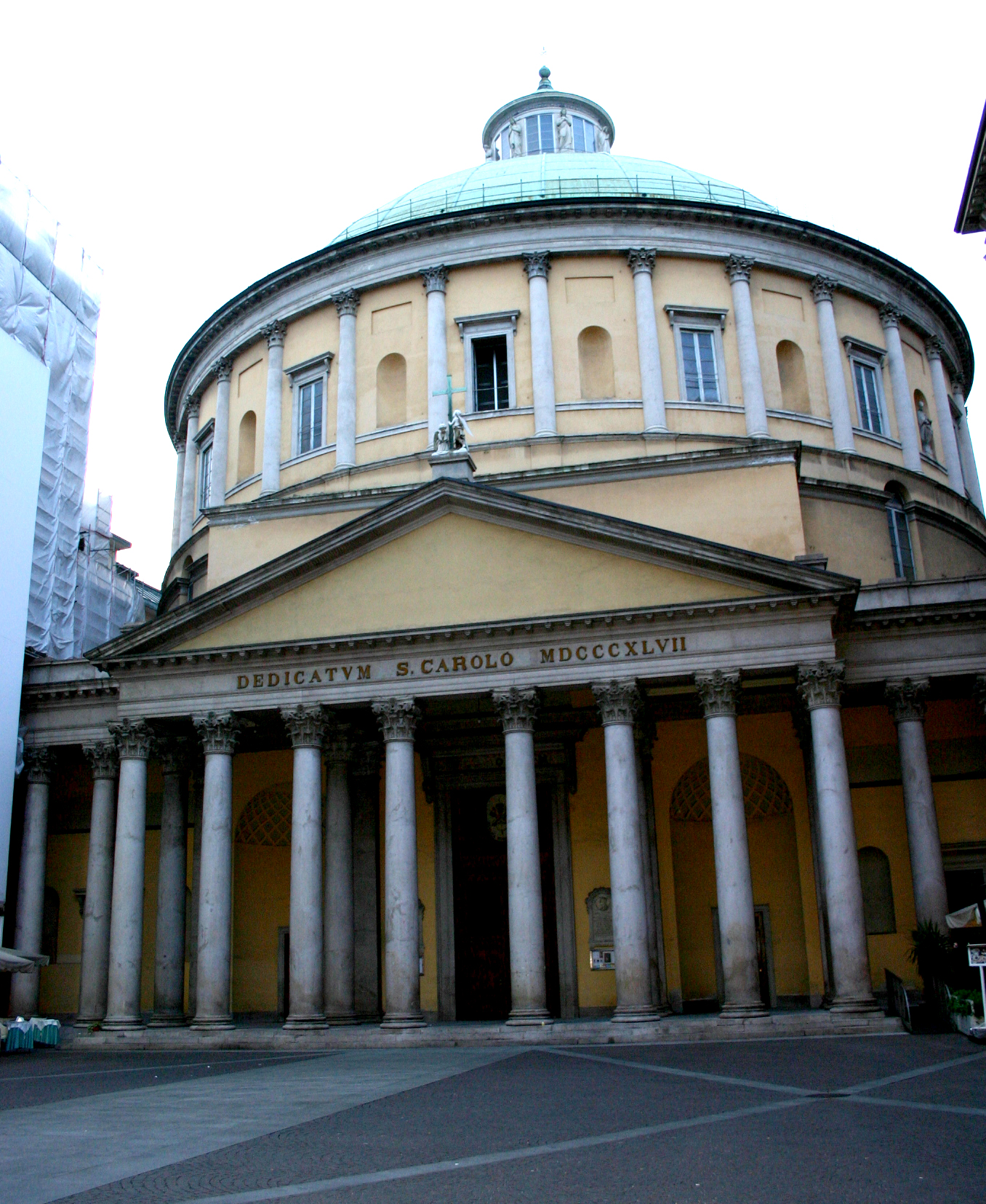
San Carlo al Corso (Milan), Italy

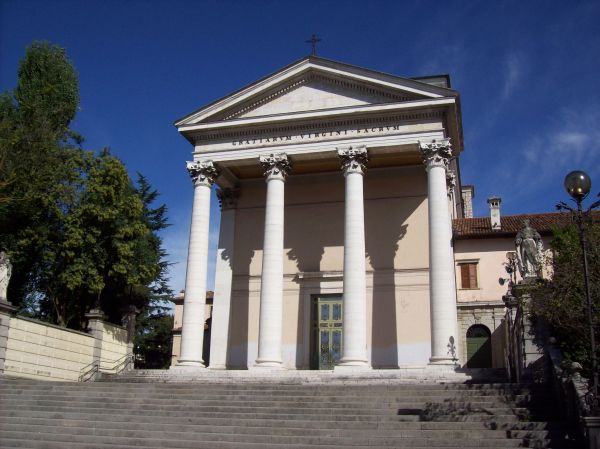
Basilica Santuario della Beata Vergine delle Grazie, Udine, Italy

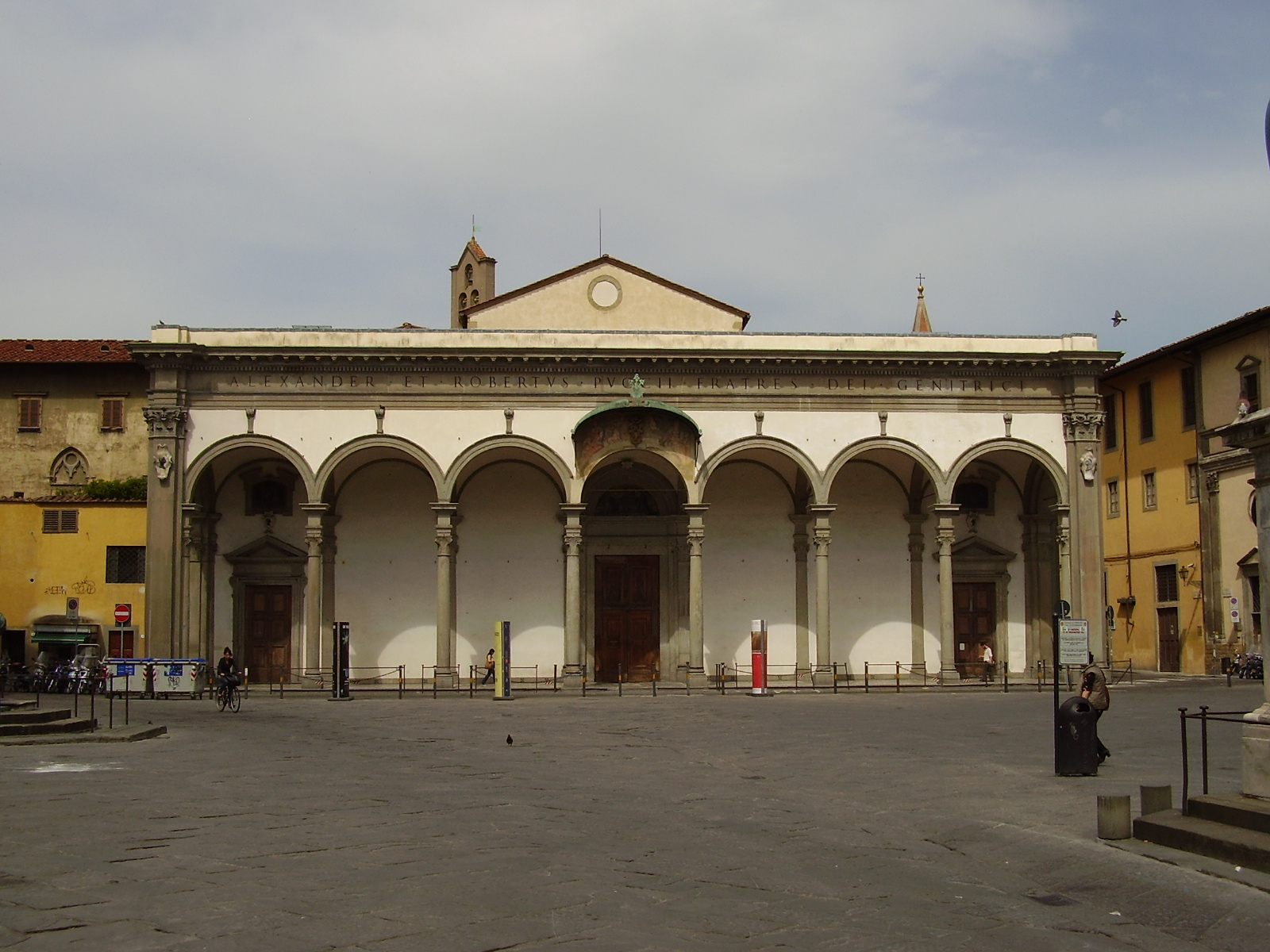
Santissima Annunziata Basilica, Florence, the mother church of the Servite Order

== See also ==
- Annunciade
- Servites of the Immaculate Conception
