= Juliana Falconieri =

Italian nun

Saint Juliana Falconieri, O.S.M.
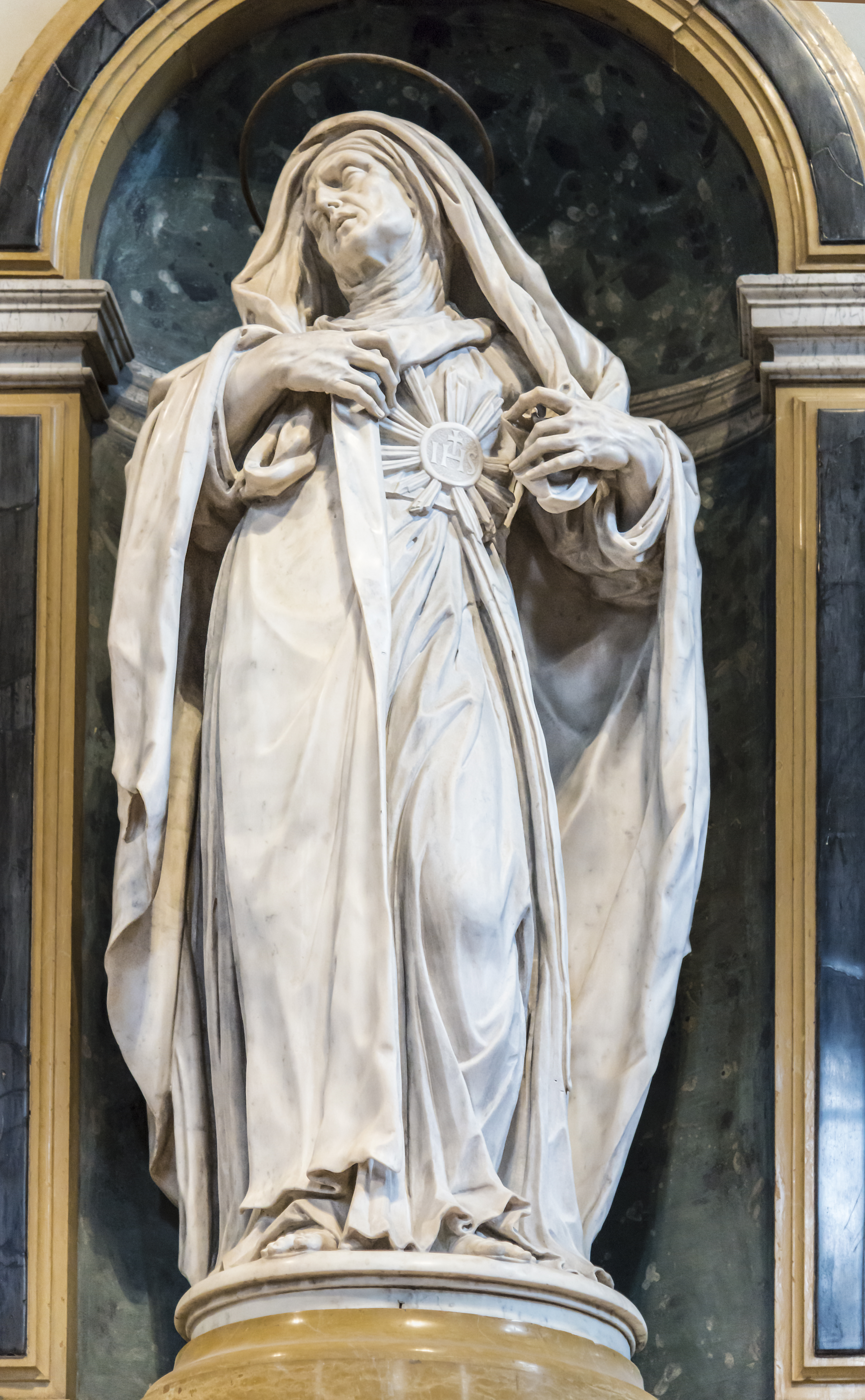

Virgin and foundress
- Born: 1270; Florence, Republic of Florence
- Died: 19 June 1341 (aged 70–71); Florence, Republic of Florence
- Venerated in: Roman Catholic Church (Servite Order)
- Beatified: 26 July 1678, Rome, Papal States by Pope Innocent XI
- Canonized: 16 June 1737, Rome, Papal States by Pope Clement XII
- Major shrine: Basilica of the Santissima Annunziata, Florence, Italy
- Feast: 19 June
- Attributes: represented in the religious habit of her Order with a Eucharistic host upon her breast
- Patronage: bodily ills, sick people, sickness

Juliana Falconieri, O.S.M., (1270 – 19 June 1341) was the Italian foundress of the Religious Sisters of the Third Order of Servites (Mantellate Sisters or the Servite Tertiaries).

== Biography ==
Juliana belonged to the noble Falconieri family of Florence. Her parents had funded the construction of Santissima Annunziata, Florence, the mother church of the Servite Order. Her uncle, Alexis Falconieri, was one of the seven founders. Under his influence, she decided at a young age to follow the consecrated life. After her father's death, she received c. 1285 the habit of the Third Order of the Servites from Philip Benizi, then Prior General of that Order. She remained at home following the rule Benizi had given her until her mother's death, when Juliana and several companions moved into a house of their own in 1305. This became the first convent of the Sisters of the Third Order of Servites. Juliana would serve as Superior until the end of her life.

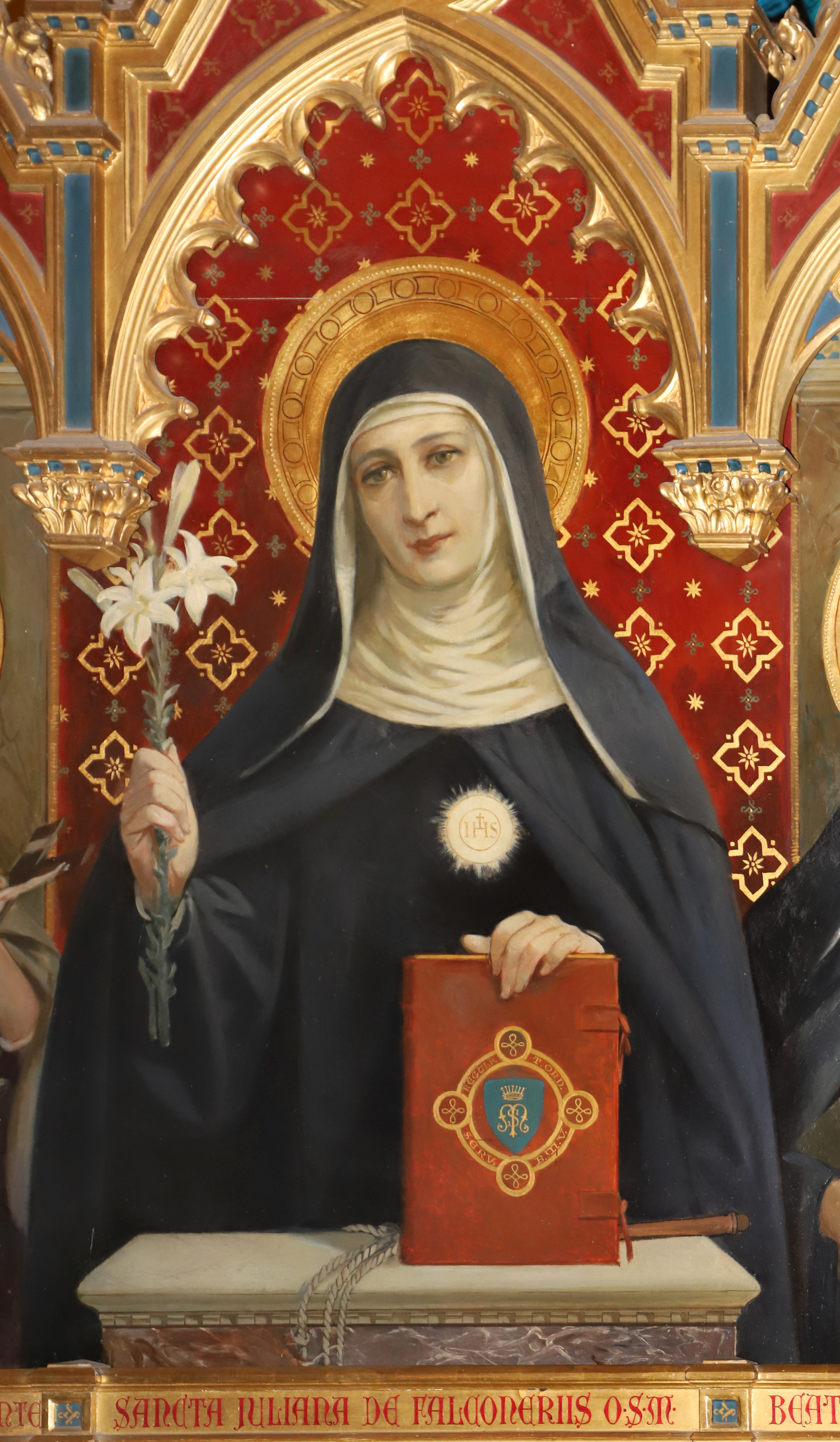
Triptych of Juliana Falconieri, 1929 by Giuseppe Cassioli, Sette Santi Fondatori church

The Servites' dress consisted of a black gown, secured by a leather girdle, and a white veil. Because the gown had short sleeves to facilitate work, people called the sisters of the new Order "Mantellate." It is said that "she would often fall in to long moments and hours of ecstacy... She was daily caring for the sick in the streets, homes, and in hospitals..." Juliana directed the community of Servite Tertiaries for 35 years and was more of a servant to her subordinates than a mistress. The sisters main devotion was to Our Lady of Sorrows and their main activity was caring for the sick.

A putative miracle mentioned in the liturgical texts for her feast day, is said to have occurred at Juliana's death. At this time, unable to receive Holy Communion because of constant vomiting, she requested the priest to spread a corporal upon her chest and lay the Eucharistic host on it. Shortly after, the host disappeared. Juliana died on 19 June 1341. The image of a cross, just like the one on the host, was found on her breast.

Immediately after her death she was honored as a saint. The Servite Order was approved by Pope Martin V in the year 1420. Pope Benedict XIII recognized the devotion long paid to her and granted the Servites permission to celebrate the feast of the Blessed Juliana. Pope Clement XII canonized her in the year 1737, and extended the celebration of her feast day (June 19) to the entire Church. Juliana is usually represented in the habit of her Order with a host upon her breast.

== Gallery ==
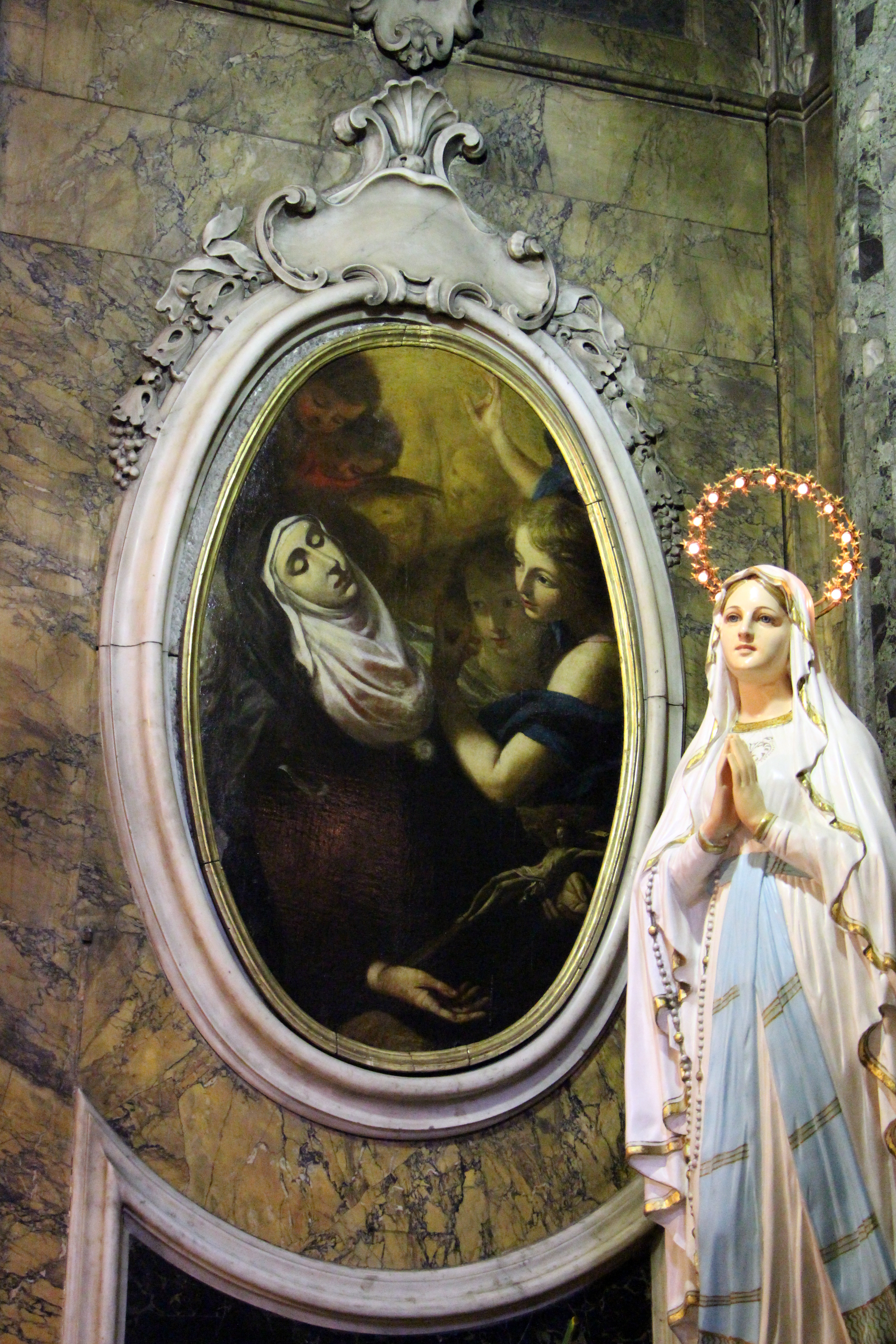
Saint Juliana Falconieri by Agostino Veracini, behind a statue of the Virgin Mary

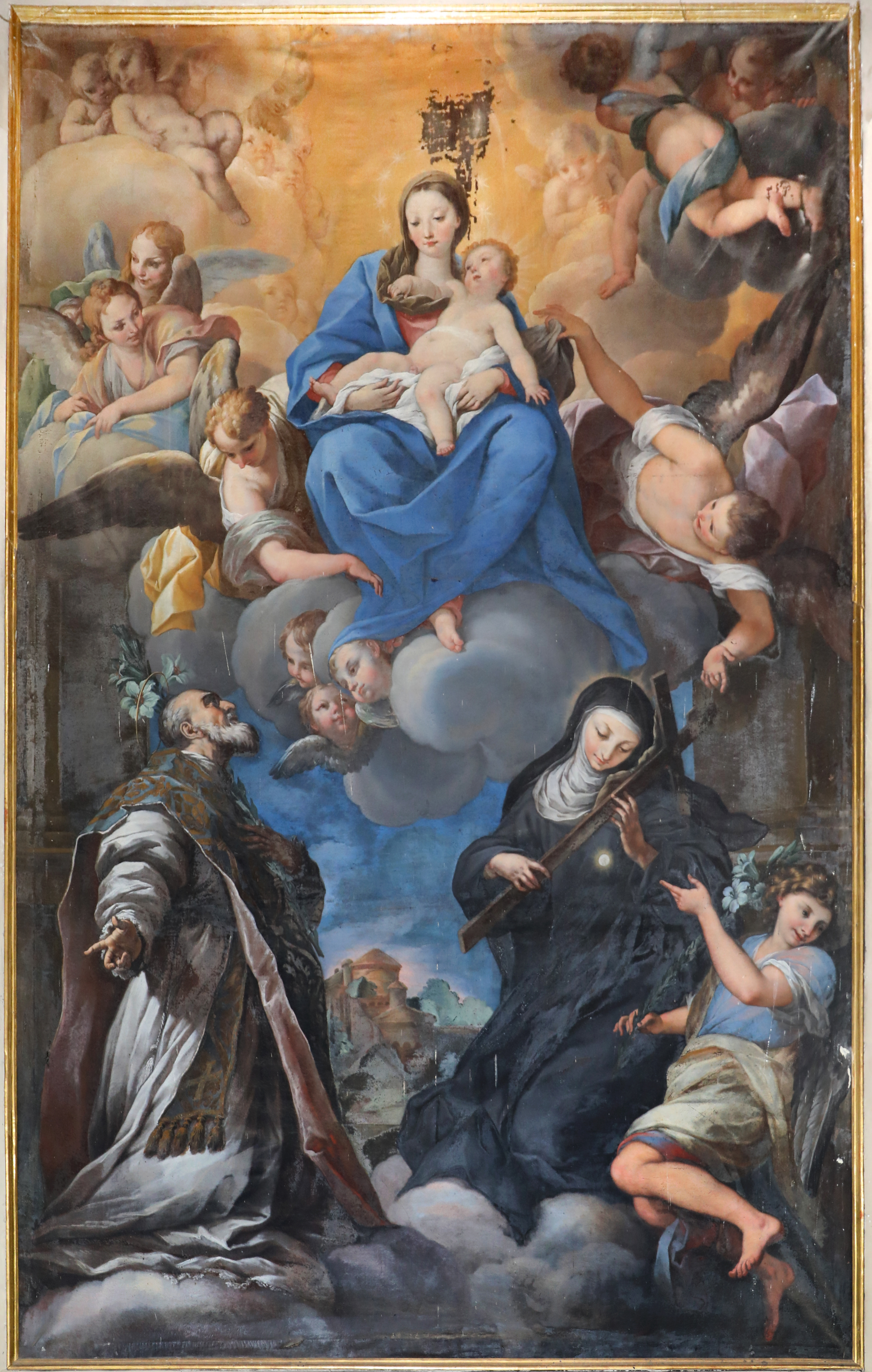
Apparition of the Madonna and Child to Saint Philip Neri and Juliana Falconieri by Giuseppe Nasini

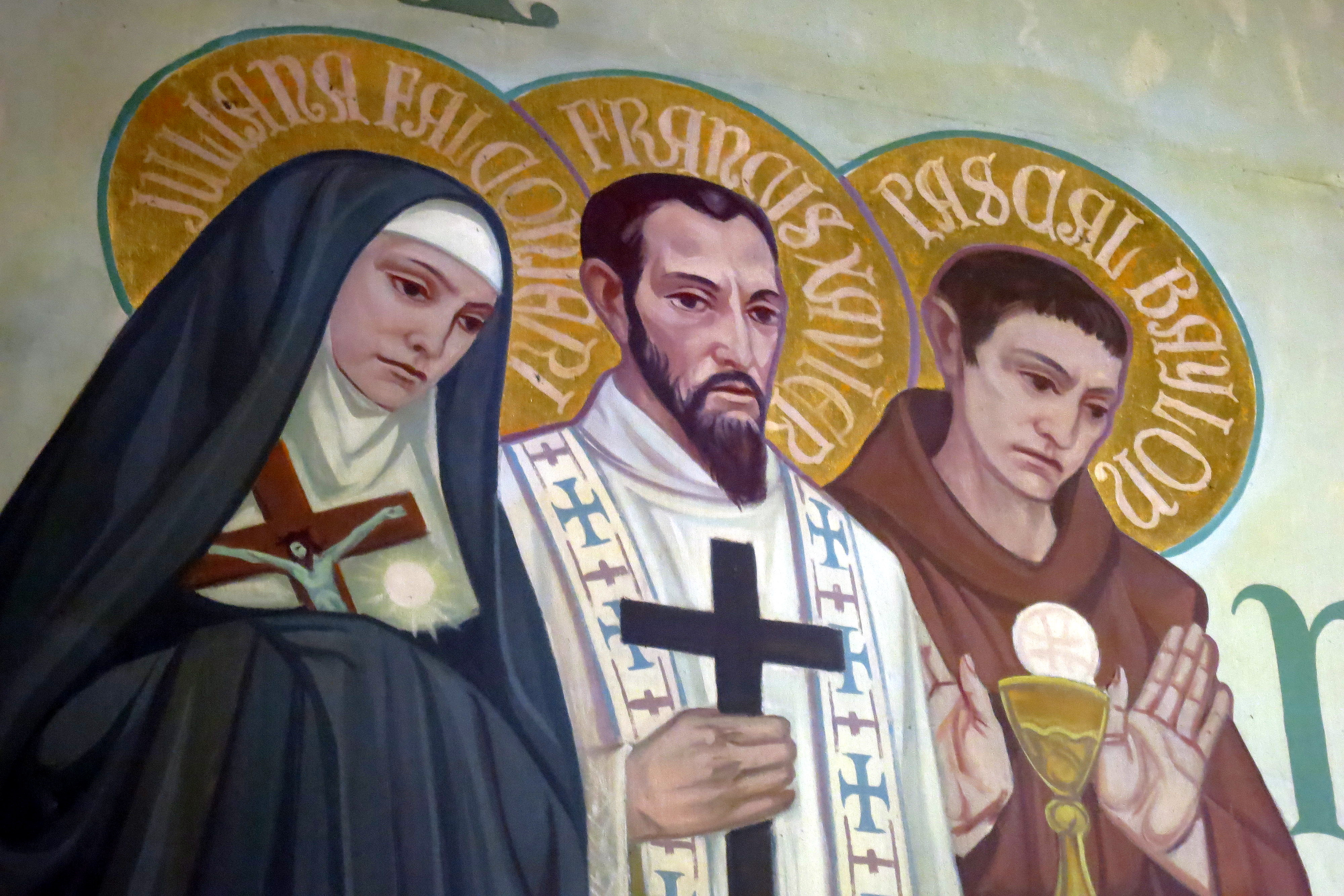
Mural detail of Saints Juliana Falconieri, Francis Xavier, & Paschal Baylon

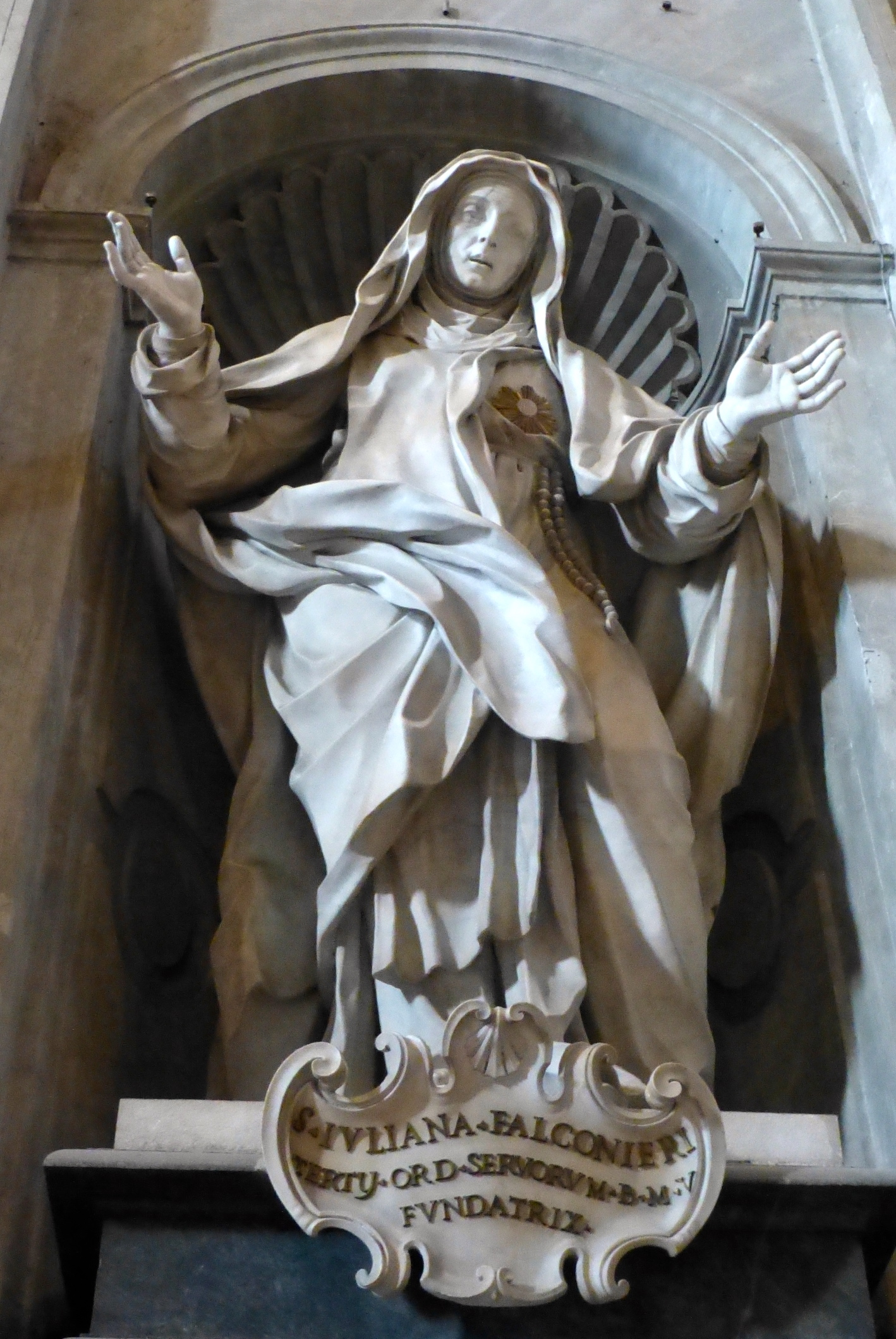
Statue of Juliana Falconieri, St Peter's Basilica

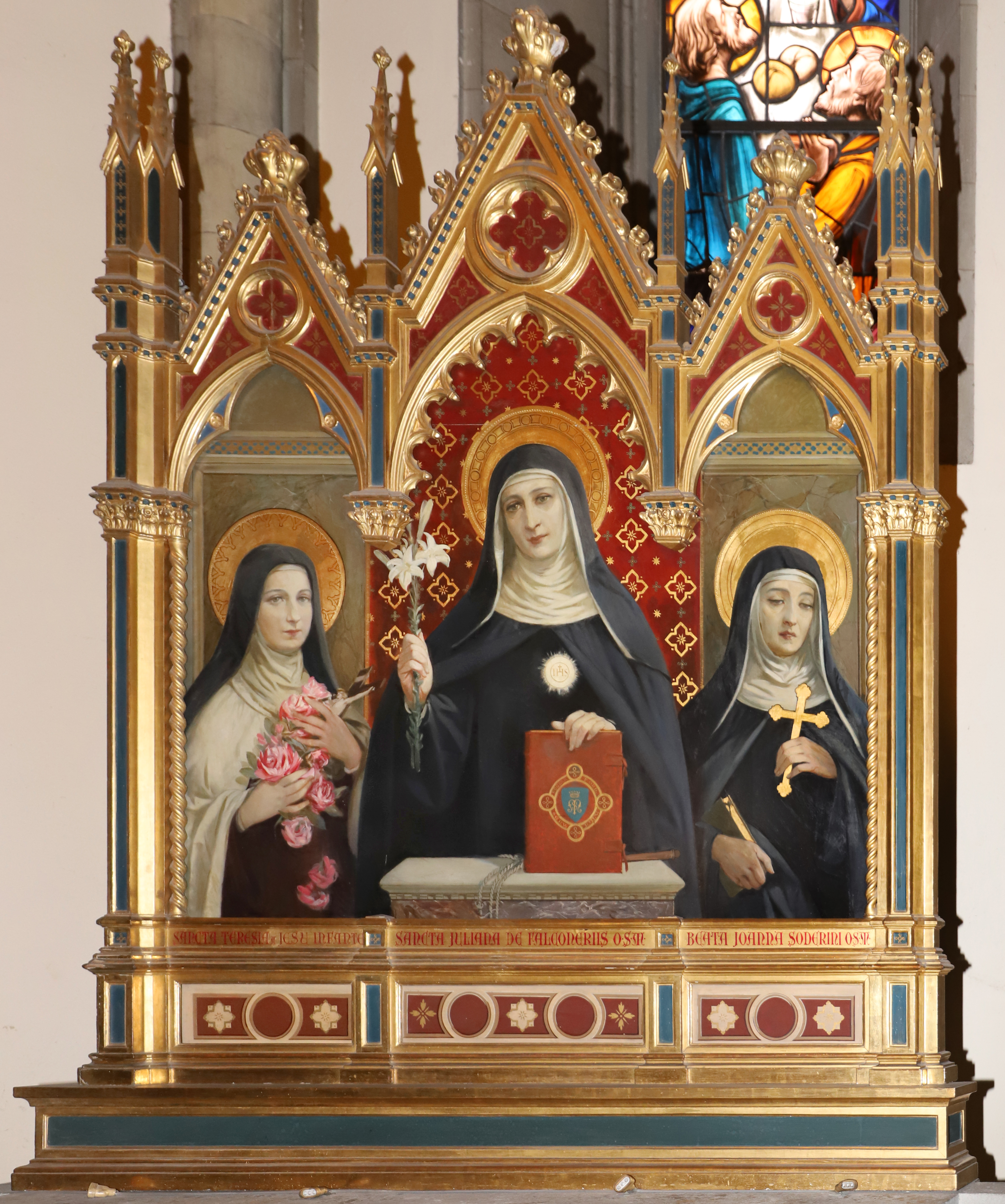
Full Triptych of Saints Juliana Falconieri, Thérèse de Lisieux and Giovanna Soderini

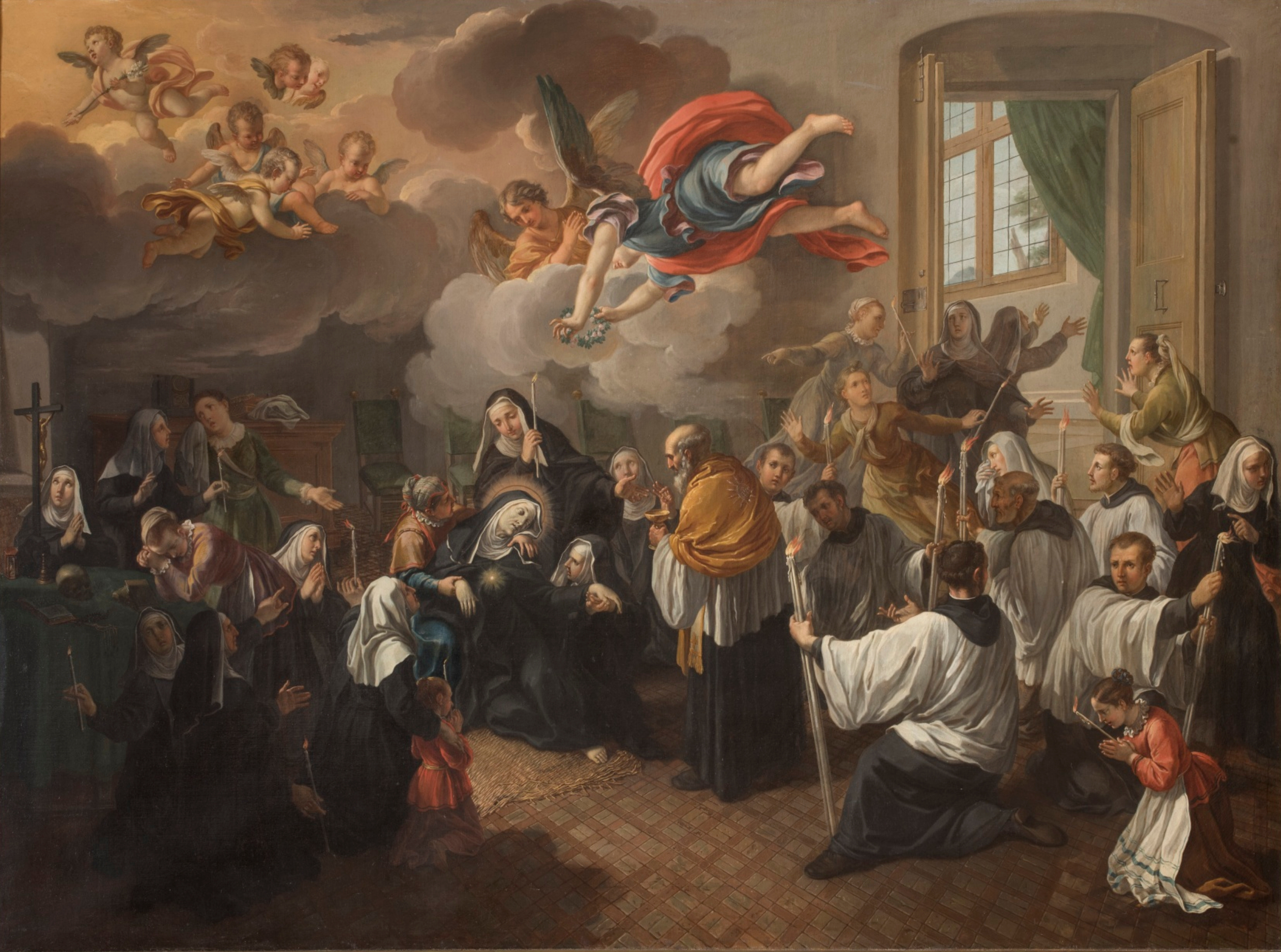
The death of Saint Giuliana Falconieri, Pier Leone Ghezzi, 1737

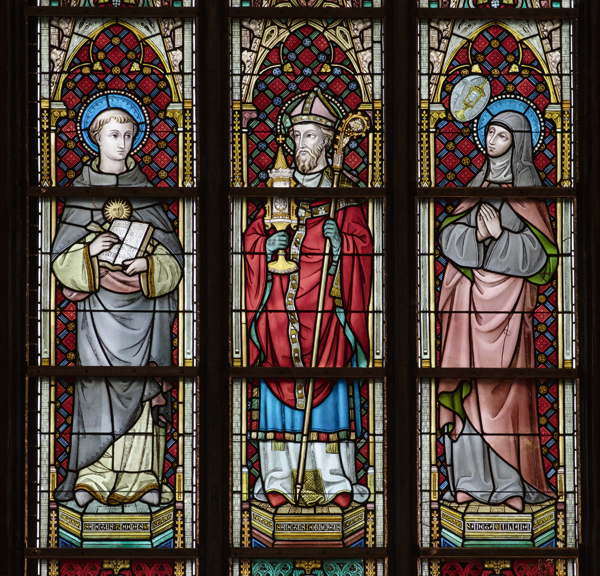
Stained glass at Église Saint-Jacques de Tournai depicting Saints Thomas Aquinas, Norbert von Xanten and Juliana Falconieri
