= Andrea Dotti (priest) =

Italian preacher (1256-1315)

Blessed Andrea Dotti OSM
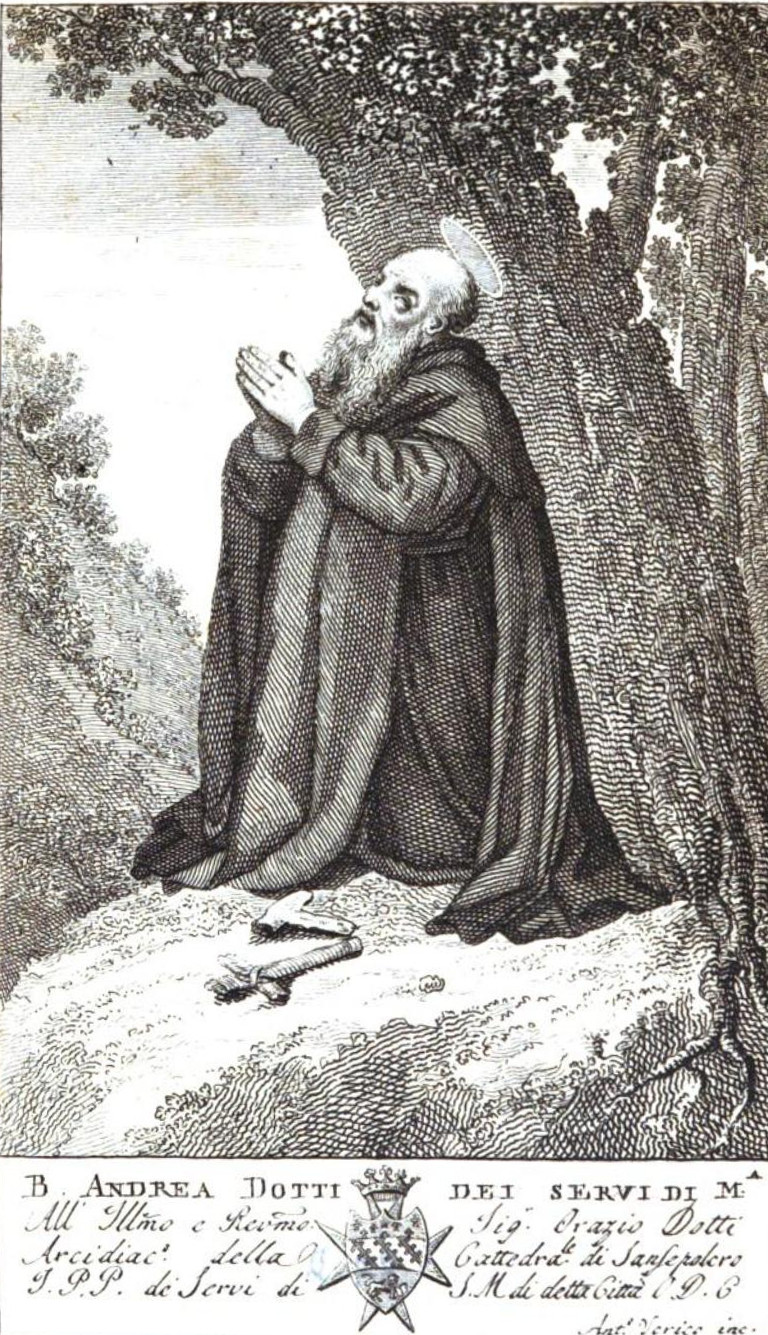

Father, Confessor of the Faith
- Born: 1256; Borgo San Sepolcro, Tuscany, Italy
- Died: 31 August 1315; Borgo San Sepolcro, Tuscany, Italy
- Venerated in: Catholic Church
- Beatified: 29 November 1806 by Pope Pius VII
- Feast: 3 September
- Influences: Philip Benizi de Damiani

Andrea Dotti OSM (1256 in Borgo San Sepolcro, Tuscany, Italy – 31 August 1315 in Borgo San Sepolcro) was an Italian Servite preacher. His feast day is September 3.

== Life ==
He was of noble parentage, being the brother of Count Dotto Dotti, captain of the archers of the body-guard of Philip the Fair. Andrea grew up as many other noblemen of his time, distinguished for courage in combat. In 1278 Philip Beniti delivered a sermon at the opening of the general chapter of his order in Borgo, and young Dotti was so struck that he at once asked to be admitted to the Servite Order. He was received by the General, and was soon after ordained to the priesthood.

His zeal manifested itself principally in preaching and penance. He filled various position of honour in the Order and by his charity and zeal won over to the Order a large number of hermits living at Vallucola. In 1295 he was named procurator at Sansepolcro charged with overseeing the monks at Vallucola.

Many visions were vouchsafed him, and he worked a great many authenticated miracles. After long years of preaching, he retired into a hermitage and renewed his penances, and died there. He was buried in a church of his native town. Pope Pius VII authorized his cult on 29 November 1806.

== Sources ==
- Anal. Ord. Serv. B.M. Virg. (Florence, 1729); I. i. 4;
- Soulier, Vie de St. Phillipe Beniti (Paris, 1886; tr. London, 1886).
