= Ferdinando Maria Baccilieri =

Blessed Ferdinando Maria Baccilieri OSM
- Born: 14 May 1821; Campodoso, Reno Finalese, Modena, Grand Duchy of Tuscany
- Died: 12 July 1893 (aged 72); Galeazza Pepoli, Bologna, Kingdom of Italy
- Venerated in: Roman Catholic Church
- Beatified: 3 October 1999, Saint Peter's Square, Vatican City by Pope John Paul II
- Feast: 13 July

Ferdinando Maria Baccilieri (14 May 1821 - 13 July 1893) was an Italian Roman Catholic priest and a professed member of the Secular Servites. Baccilieri was also the founder of the Sisters Servants of Mary of Galeazza - a religious congregation designed for women. He had become well known for restoring a troubled parish to one brimming with the faith and was made its parochial vicar as a result of his good work and effort in the Bolognese parish.

He died with a staunch reputation for personal holiness and was beatified on 3 October 1999 after Pope John Paul II approved the findings of the beatification cause which included a miracle attributed to his direct intercession.

== Life ==
Ferdinando Maria Baccilieri was born on 14 May 1821 in Modena to parents who ran a school where Baccilieri spent most of his childhood; he was baptized on 15 May 1821. It was there he received a decent education and also studied with the Barnabites in Bologna and the Jesuits in Ferrara.

When he studied with the Jesuits he felt that he had a strong calling to the religious life and desired to join the missions in the East as a means of spreading the message of the Gospel. However this idea never materialized so he instead went to Rome to commence his novitiate as a potential Jesuit; however ill health forced him to drop out and return home. He underwent his theological and philosophical studies (and also learnt civil and canon law) and was ordained to the priesthood upon the completion of his studies on 2 March 1844. In 1851 he was sent to Bologna to the troubled parish of Galeazza Pepoli - as a sign of the archdiocese's esteem for his work he was appointed as the parochial vicar of that parish. He made later vows as a Secular Servite in 1855.

In 1867 Baccilieri lost his voice and was forced to write out homilies and addresses and have others deliver them for him. Despite this, he continued to focus on hearing confessions and caring for the parish community the work of his congregation. In 1862 he opened a small convent for girls and in 1866 formalized it under a Rule that would evolve into a religious congregation. The congregation he had founded was devoted to the instruction of children in a religious education and also catered to providing assistance to the ill. The congregation also worked for the promotion of parish activities. He welcomed the poor and was known for his enlightened views of Christian attitudes towards the poor. He also tended to orphans. Baccilieri was also well known as a great spiritual director who would hear up to 16 hours of confession from his flock. He also taught Italian and Latin to seminarians in Finale Emilia.

Baccilieri died on 13 July 1893 and was buried in a simple tomb in the parish next to the motherhouse of the congregation.

=== Congregation's future ===
The Archbishop of Bologna Cardinal Domenico Svampa approved the congregation of sisters as being one of diocesan right and also approved the Rule on 21 November 1899. The papal decree of praise was issued on 19 May 1939 and the Constitution of the congregation received the approval of Pope Pius XII on 27 January 1947 who acknowledged the congregation as one of pontifical right.

As of 2005 there were 137 religious in a total of 28 houses across the globe. The congregation now operates in nations such as the Czech Republic and South Korea.

== Beatification ==
The beatification process started in Bologna and witnessed two process being held as a means of investigating his life and the work he did in his parish. The processes were also tasked with investigating how he exercised the proper virtues in a manner deemed prudent with Christian ethics and the principles of the Gospel. On 27 January 1966 all of his writings were approved after thorough investigation and were thus incorporated into the process and material collected. These processes occurred despite the fact that the Congregation for the Causes of Saints - under Pope John Paul II - did not grant their formal approval to the cause until 19 serJanuary 1979; this also conferred upon him the title of Servant of God - the first stage in the process.

On 7 June 1988 a historical commission in Rome had to meet to see whether or not there were obstacles that could impede the process; the board granted their approval and thus allowed for the cause to proceed to the next stage. The postulation submitted the Positio - complete with biographical details and making the case for his sainthood - in 1989 with the Congregation for the Causes of Saints granting ratification to the previous diocesan processes on 2 June 1989.

He was declared to be venerable on 6 April 1995 after Pope John Paul II acknowledged the fact that he had lived a life of heroic virtue. A miracle attributed to Baccilieri's intercession was investigated in its diocese of origin. John Paul II approved the healing to be a miracle in 1998 and beatified Baccilieri on 3 October 1999. The postulator assigned to the cause is the Franco M. Azzali OSM.
