= Francesco Patrizi (Servite) =

Siennese saint (1263–1328)

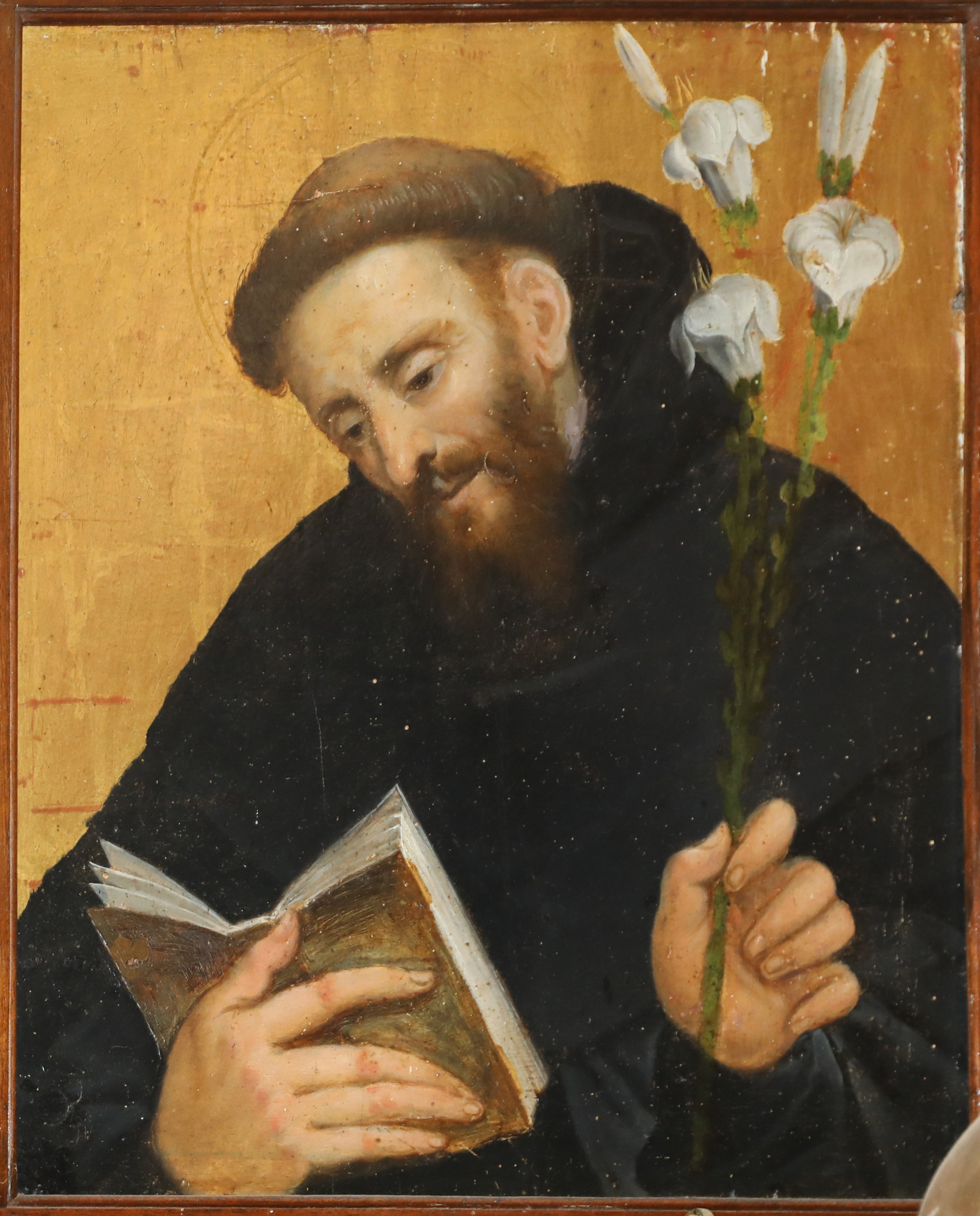
Portrait of Patrizi in Santa Maria dei Servi. From the Sienese school.

Francesco Patrizi (1263–1328) was a prominent early member of the Servite Order. Born in 1263 in Siena, he was the son of Enrico (Arrighetto) Patrizi and Raynalda. He was inspired by a sermon of Ambrose of Siena to join the Servites. After the death of his mother in 1285, he was accepted into the order by Philip Benizi. He was renowned as a peacemaker. He died on 12 or 26 May 1328 in Siena. He was beatified in 1743 by Pope Benedict XIV. His feast day is 26 May in the Roman Martyrology. The famous 15th-century humanist philosopher Francesco Patrizi was a relative.
