= Monte Senario =

Servite monastery in Vaglia, Italy

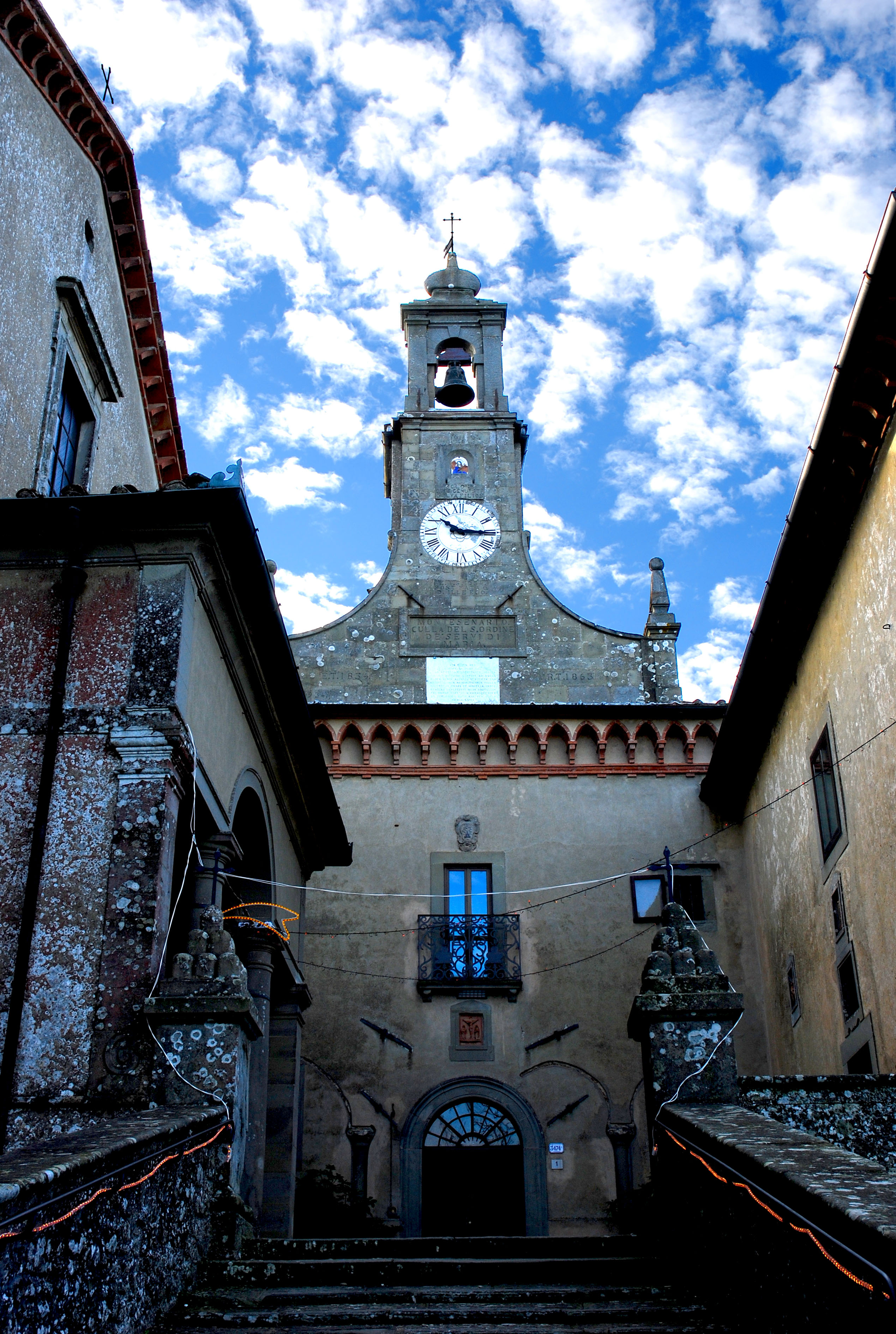

- Location within Tuscany
- Interactive map of Monte Senario

Monastery information
- Other names: Santuario di Montesenario; Convento di Montesenario
- Order: Servite
- Established: circa 1245

Architecture
- Status: Minor basilica

Site
- Location: Vaglia, Tuscany, Italy
- Coordinates: 43.8953°N 11.3335°E
- Public access: exterior
- Website: montesenariosacroeremo.eu

Monte Senario is a Servite monastery in the comune of Vaglia, near Florence in Tuscany, in central Italy. It stands on the mountain of the same name, on the watershed between the Valdarno to the south and the Mugello to the north. It was established in 1245 by the seven founding members of the Servite order and was the first Servite monastery.

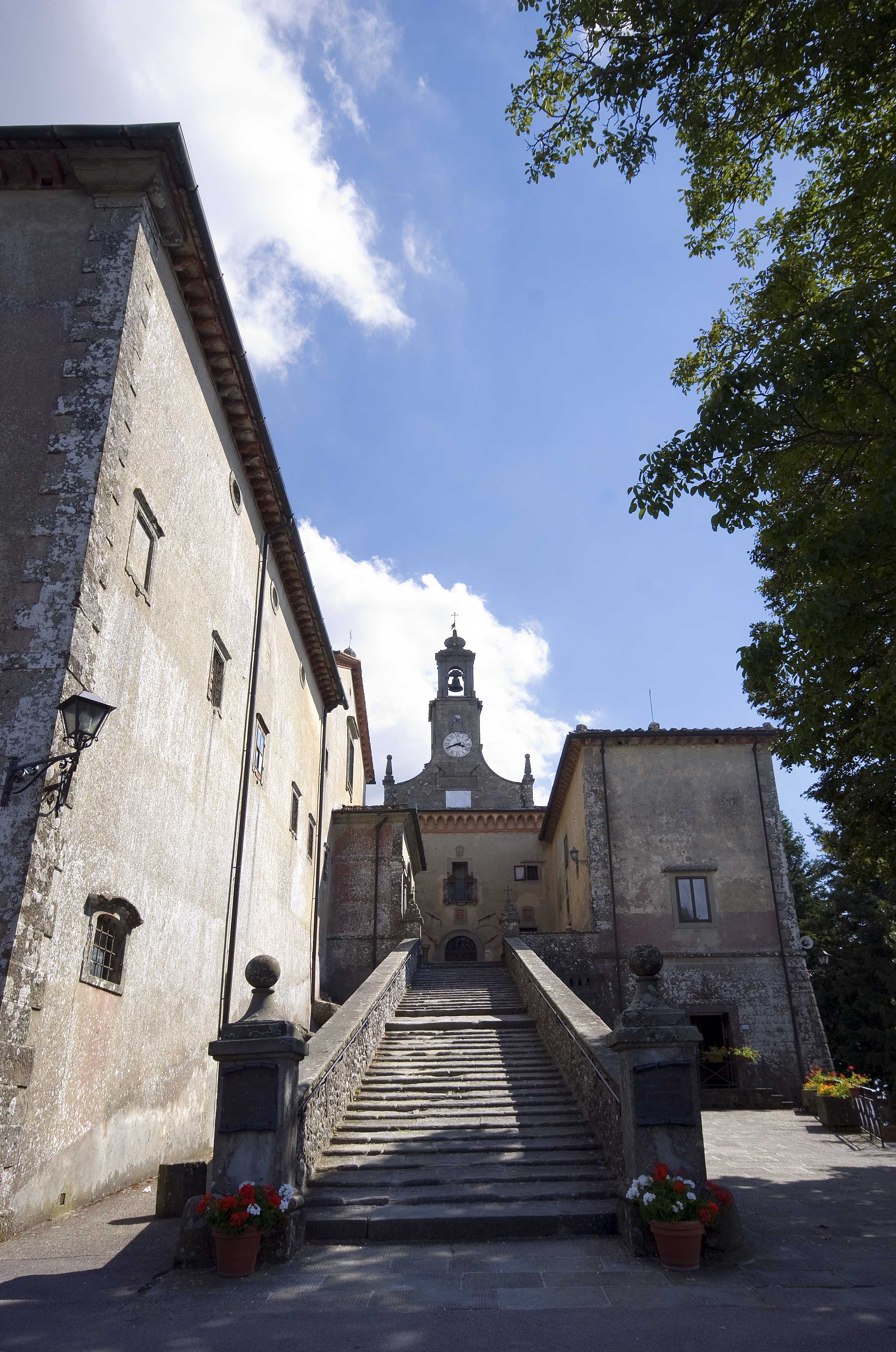
The stairs to the monastery
