= Chronological list of saints and blesseds in the 20th century =

This is a list of people, who died during the 20th century, who have received recognition as Blessed (through beatification) or Saint (through canonization)

== List ==
Name	Birth	Birthplace	Death	Place of death	Notes
Josep Manyanet y Vives	1833	Tremp, Spain	1901	Barcelona, Spain	Priest
Blessed Louis Zephyrinus Moreau	1824	Bécancour, Quebec, British Province of Lower Canada	1901	Saint-Hyacinthe, Quebec, Canada	Bishop of Saint-Hyacinthe
Blessed Tommaso Reggio	1818	Genoa, Kingdom of Piedmont-Sardinia	1901	Genoa, Kingdom of Italy	Archbishop of Genoa
Agostino Roscelli	1818	Bargone, Casarza Ligure (now Genoa), Kingdom of Piedmont-Sardinia	1902	Genoa, Kingdom of Italy	Priest
Maria Goretti	1890	Corinaldo, Province of Ancona, Marche, Kingdom of Italy	1902	Nettuno, Province of Rome, Lazio, Kingdom of Italy	Virgin and martyr, associated with the Passionists
Blessed Contardo Ferrini	1859	Milan, Kingdom of Lombardy–Venetia	1902	Suna, Novara, Kingdom of Italy	Member of Third Order of Saint Francis
Blessed Grimoaldo of the Purification (Ferdinando Santamaria)	1883	Pontecorvo, Italy	1902	Ceccano, Italy	Member of Congregation of the Passion
Blessed Maria of Jesus Siedliska	1842	Roszkowa Wola, Congress Poland	1902	Rome, Italy	Founder of the Sisters of the Holy Family of Nazareth
Blessed Matilde of the Sacred Heart	1841	Robledillo de la Vera, Cáceres, Kingdom of Spain	1902	Don Benito, Badajoz, Kingdom of Spain	Founder of Congregation of the Daughters of Mary, Mother of the Church
Gemma Galgani	1878	Camigliano, Italy	1903	Lucca, Italy	Virgin, associated with the Passionists
Blessed Clemente Marchisio	1833	Racconigi, Cuneo, Kingdom of Piedmont-Sardinia	1903	Rivalba, Turin, Italy	Priest, founder of the Institute of the Daughters of St. Joseph
Geltrude Caterina Comensoli	1847	Bienno, Italy	1903	Bergamo, Italy	Founder of Congregation of the Sacramentine Sisters of Bergamo
Blessed Marie-Joseph Cassant	1878	Casseneuil, French Third Republic	1903	Toulouse, French Third Republic	Trappist priest
Blessed Hendrina Stenmanns (Josepha)	1852	Issum, Kleve, German Confederation	1903	Steyl, Limburg, Netherlands	Co-foundress of Missionary Sisters Servants of the Holy Spirit
Blessed Mary of the Passion (Helene de Chappotin)	1839	Nantes, Orléanist Kingdom of France	1904	San Remo, Italy	Foundress of Franciscan Missionaries of Mary
Blessed Laura Vicuña	1891	Santiago, Chile	1904	Junín de los Andes, Neuquén, Argentina	Virgin, associated with the Salesian Sisters of Don Bosco
Blessed Bonifacia Rodriguez Castro	1837	Salamanca, Spain	1905	Zamora, Spain	Co-foundress of Servants of St. Joseph
Blessed Giovanni Battista Scalabrini	1839	Fino Mornasco, Italy	1905	Piacenza, Italy	Bishop of Piacenza and founder of Missionaries of St. Charles Borromeo (Scalabrinians for Migrants)
Blessed Juan Nepomuceno Zegrí Moreno	1831	Grenada, Spain	1905	Málaga, Spain	Founder of Sisters of Charity of the Blessed Virgin Mary of Mercy
Blessed Valentinus Paquay	1828	Tongeren, Belgium	1905	Hasselt, Belgium	Religious priest of the Order of Friars Minor
Blessed Małgorzata Szewczyk	1828	Khmelnytskyi, Galicia and Lodomeria	1905	Aleksandrów, Poland	Foundress of Daughters of the Sorrowful Mother of God
Ezekiel Moreno y Diaz	1848	Alfaro, Spain	1906	Montegudo, Spain	Missionary, Bishop of Pasto
Elizabeth of the Trinity (Élisabeth Catez)	1880	Avord, Cher, French Third Republic	1906	Dijon, French Third Republic	Discalced Carmelite
Blessed Giuseppina Gabriela Bonino (Josephine Gabriel Bonino)	1843	Savigliano, Italy	1906	Savona, Italy	Foundress of Sisters of the Holy Family
Blessed Maria Christina Brando	1856	Naples, Italy	1906	Casoria, Italy	Founder of Congregation of the Sisters, Expiatory Victims of Jesus in the Blessed Sacrament
Blessed Ana Petra Pérez Florido	1845	Málaga, Spain	1906	Barcelona, Spain	Founder of the Institute of the Mothers of the Helpless and of St. Joseph of the Mountain
Raphael Kalinowski	1835	Vilnius, Lithuania	1907	Wadowice, Poland	Discalced Carmelite priest
Joseph Freinademetz	1852	Badia, County of Tyrol, Austrian Empire	1908	Daijiazhuang, Jining, South Shandong, Chinese Empire	Religious priest of the Society of the Divine Word, Missionary
Blessed Maddalena Caterina Morano	1847	Chieri, Italy	1908	Catania, Italy	Member of Salesian Sisters of Don Bosco
Arnold Janssen	1837	Goch, Kingdom of Prussia	1909	Steyl, Netherlands	Priest, founder of the Society of the Divine Word
Blessed Ciriaco María Sancha y Hervás	1833	Quintana del Pidio, Spain	1909	Toledo, Spain	Archbishop of Toledo, Cardinal
Blessed Emmanuel Domingo y Sol	1836	Tortosa, Spain	1909	Tortosa, Spain	Priest, founder of the Pontifical Spanish College in Rome
Blessed Isidore Bakanja	1885	Bokendela, Congo Free State	1909	Busira, Belgian Congo	Martyr
Mary MacKillop	1842	Newtown, Melbourne, British Colony of New South Wales (now Fitzroy, Victoria, Australia)	1909	North Sydney, New South Wales, Australia	Co-founder of the Sisters of St Joseph of the Sacred Heart
Miguel Febres Cordero	1854	Cuenca, Ecuador	1910	Premia, Italy	Member of Institute of the Brothers of the Christian Schools
Blessed Alfonso Maria Fusco	1839	Angri, Italy	1910	Angri, Italy	Priest, founder of the Congregation of the Sisters of St. John the Baptist
Blessed Maria Schininà	1844	Ragusa, Kingdom of the Two Sicilies	1910	Ragusa, Kingdom of Italy	Founder of the Sisters of the Sacred Heart of Jesus
Blessed Bernard Mary of Jesus (Cesare Silvestrelli)	1831	Rome, Italy	1911	Moricone, Italy	Passionist priest
Blessed Josephine Vannini	1859	Rome, Papal States	1911	Rome, Kingdom of Italy	Co-founder of Daughters of St. Camillus
Blessed Maria Marcellina Darowska	1827	Szulaki, Poland (now in Ukraine)	1911	Jazłowiec, Poland (now in Ukraine)	Founder of Sisters of the Immaculate Conception of the Blessed Virgin Mary
María del Monte Carmelo Sallés y Barangueras	1848	Vic, Barcelona, Spain	1911	Madrid, Spain	Foundress of Missionary Sisters of the Immaculate Conception
Arcangelo Tadini	1846	Verolanuova, Italy	1912	Botticino Sera, Italy	Priest, founder of the Congregation of Worker Sisters of the Holy House of Nazareth
Blessed Bronisław Markiewicz	1842	Pruchnik, Austrian Empire	1912	Miejsce Piastowe, Austria-Hungary	Salesian priest, founder of Congregation of Saint Michael the Archangel
Candida Maria de Jesus Cipitria y Barriola	1845	Andoain, Spain	1912	Salamanca, Spain	Foundress of Daughters of Jesus
Blessed Jan Beyzym	1850	Stari Beizymy, Shepetivka, Russian Empire	1912	Marana, Fianarantsoa, Madagascar	Jesuit priest and missionary in Madagascar
Maria Josefa of the Heart of Jesus	1842	Vitoria, Álava, Spain	1912	Bilbao, Biscay, Spain	Foundress of Servants of Jesus of Charity
Blessed Francesco Spinelli	1853	Milan, Kingdom of Lombardy–Venetia	1913	Rivolta d'Adda, Cremona, Kingdom of Italy	Founder of the Sisters Adorers of the Blessed Sacrament
Blessed Giovanni Maria Boccardo	1848	Moncalieri, Turin, Kingdom of Sardinia	1913	Moncalieri, Turin, Kingdom of Italy	Founder of the Poor Daughters of Saint Cajetan
Giovanni Battista Piamarta	1841	Brescia, Kingdom of Lombardy–Venetia	1913	Remedello, Kingdom of Italy	Founder of Congregation of the Holy Family of Nazareth
Blessed Ulrika Nisch	1882	Oberdorf, German Empire	1913	Allensbach, German Empire	Religious sister of the Sisters of Mercy of the Holy Cross of Ingenbohl
Benedict Menni	1841	Milan, Kingdom of Lombardy–Venetia	1914	Dinan, Côtes-d'Armor, French Third Republic	Member of Brothers Hospitallers of Saint John of God
Pius X (Giuseppe Melchiorre Sarto)	1835	Riese, Italy	1914	Apostolic Palace, Vatican City	Pope
Blessed Elena Guerra	1835	Lucca, Duchy of Lucca	1914	Lucca, Kingdom of Italy	Foundress of the Oblates of the Holy Spirit
Blessed Joseph Gerard	1831	Bouxières-aux-Chênes, Orléanist Kingdom of France	1914	Roma, British Basutoland (now in Lesotho)	Priest and missionary of Missionary Oblates of Mary Immaculate
Leonie Françoise de Sales Aviat	1844	Sézanne, Marne, Kingdom of France	1914	Perugia, Kingdom of Italy	Co-founder of Oblate Sisters of St. Francis de Sales
Rafqa Pietra Choboq Ar-Rayès (Rebecca)	1832	Himlaya, Mount Lebanon Emirate	1914	Monastery of Saint Joseph, Jrebta, Lebanon	Nun of the Lebanese Maronite Order
Blessed Ignatius Maloyan	1869	Mardin, Ottoman Empire	1915	Mardin Province, Ottoman Empire	Archbishop of Mardin, martyr
Blessed Giuseppe Baldo	1843	Puegnano, Brescia, Kingdom of Lombardy–Venetia	1915	Ronco all'Adige, Verona, Kingdom of Italy	Founder of the Little Daughters of Saint Joseph and Sisters of Charity of Saint Mary
Luigi Guanella	1842	Fraciscio, Campodolcino, Kingdom of Lombardy–Venetia	1915	Como, Kingdom of Italy	Founder of Daughters of Saint Mary of Providence, Servants of Charity and Pious Union of Saint Joseph
Blessed Tommaso Riccardi (Placido)	1844	Trevi, Perugia, Papal States	1915	Rome, Kingdom of Italy	Benedictine religious priest
Albert Chmielowski	1845	Igołomia, Congress Poland	1916	Kraków, Austria-Hungary	Founder of the Albertine Brothers and Albertine Sisters
Charles de Foucauld	1858	Strasbourg, Second French Empire	1916	Tamanrasset, French Algeria	Priest and hermit
Blessed Frédéric Janssoone	1838	Ghyvelde, Hauts-de-France, Orléanist Kingdom of France	1916	Montreal, Canada	Priest and missionary of the Order of Friars Minor
Blessed Honorat da Biała	1829	Biała Podlaska, Congress Poland	1916	Nowe Miasto nad Pilicą, Mazowieckie, Vistula Land	Religious priest of the Order of Friars Minor Capuchin
Blessed Isidore de Loor (Isidore of Saint Joseph)	1881	Vrasene, Belgium	1916	Kortrijk, Belgium	Passionist brother
Blessed Ludwika Szczęsna (Klara)	1863	Cieszki, Lubowidz, Żuromin, Congress Poland	1916	Kraków, Kingdom of Poland	Co-founder of the Sisters, Servants of the Most Sacred Heart of Jesus
Blessed Juana María Condesa Lluch	1862	Valencia, Kingdom of Spain	1916	Valencia, Kingdom of Spain	Foundress of Handmaids of Mary Immaculate
Blessed Giulia Valle (Nemesia)	1847	Aosta, Kingdom of Sardinia	1916	Borgaro Torinese, Turin, Kingdom of Italy	Member of the Sisters of Charity of Saint Joan Antida Thouret
Blessed Tomasa Ortiz Real (Piedad of the Cross)	1842	Bocairent, Valencia, Kingdom of Spain	1916	Alcantarilla, Murcia, Kingdom of Spain	Foundress of the Salesian Sisters of the Sacred Heart
Frances Xavier Cabrini	1850	Sant'Angelo Lodigiano, Italy	1917	Chicago, Illinois, United States	Foundress of Missionary Sisters of the Sacred Heart of Jesus
Mutien-Marie Wiaux	1841	Mellet, Belgium	1917	Malonne, Belgium	Member of Institute of the Brothers of the Christian Schools
Blessed Blandine Merten	1883	Düppenweiler, Saarland, Germany	1918	Trier, Germany	Ursuline
Blessed María Dolores Rodríguez Sopeña	1848	Vélez-Rubio, Almería, Kingdom of Spain	1918	Madrid, Kingdom of Spain	Founder of Sisters of the Catechetical Institute
Marianne Cope	1838	Heppenheim, Grand Duchy of Hesse	1918	Kalaupapa, Territory of Hawaii, United States	Member of the Sisters of St. Francis of Syracuse, New York
Blesseds Daudi Okelo and Jildo Irwa	c.1900, 1906	Uganda	1918	Paimol, Uganda	Uganda Martyrs
Blessed Giuseppe Oddi (Diego da Vallinfreda)	1839	Vallinfreda, Rome, Papal States	1919	Bellegra, Rome, Kingdom of Italy	Religious brother of Order of Friars Minor Capuchin
Francisco Marto	1908	Fátima, Portugal	1919	Fátima, Portugal	Seer of Our Lady of Fatima
Blessed Josaphata Michaelina Hordashevska	1869	Lwów, Galicia, Austria-Hungary	1919	Krystynopol, Ukrainian People's Republic	Co-foundress of the Sisters Servants of Mary Immaculate
José Gregorio Hernández	1864	Isnotú, Trujillo, Venezuela	1919	Caracas, Venezuela	Father of new medicine in Venezuela
Blessed María Antonia Bandrés Elósegui	1898	Tolosa, Guipúzcoa, Kingdom of Spain	1919	Salamanca, Kingdom of Spain	Member of Daughters of Jesus
Teresa de Jesús de Los Andes (Juana Fernández Solar)	1900	Santiago, Chile	1920	Los Andes, Chile	Discalced Carmelite
Jacinta Marto	1910	Fátima, Portugal	1920	Queen Stephanie's Hospital, Lisbon, Portugal	Laywoman, one of the seers of Our Lady of Fatima
Zygmunt Gorazdowski (or Horazdovski)	1845	Sanok, Podkarpackie, Kingdom of Galicia and Lodomeria, Austria-Hungary	1920	Lwów, Republic of Poland	Founder of the Sisters of Saint Joseph
Blessed Andrea Carlo Ferrari	1850	Lalatta (Palanzano), Province of Parma, Kingdom of Lombardy–Venetia	1921	Milan, Lombardy, Kingdom of Italy	Archbishop of Milan, Cardinal
Blessed Maria Angela Picco (Anna Eugenia)	1867	Crescenzago, Milan, Kingdom of Italy	1921	Parma, Kingdom of Italy	Religious sister of the Little Daughters of the Sacred Hearts of Jesus and Mary
Blessed Maria Anna Rosa Caiani (Maria Margherita of the Sacred Heart)	1863	Poggio a Caiano, Florence, Kingdom of Italy	1921	Poggio a Caiano, Florence, Kingdom of Italy	Foundress of the Minim Sisters of the Sacred Heart
Maria Bertilla Boscardin (Anna Francesca Boscardin)	1888	Brendola, Italy	1922	Treviso, Italy	Member of the Teachers of Saint Dorothy, Daughters of the Sacred Heart
Blessed Angela Salawa	1881	Siepraw, Kingdom of Galicia and Lodomeria, Austria-Hungary	1922	Kraków, Małopolskie, Poland	Member of the Third Order of Saint Francis
Blessed Charles	1887	Persenbeug Castle, Persenbeug-Gottsdorf, Austria-Hungary	1922	Funchal, Madeira, Portugal	Emperor of Austria and King of Hungary
Blessed Maria Fortunata Viti	1827	Veroli, Italy	1922	Veroli, Italy	Benedictine
Blessed Joseph Nascimbeni	1851	Torri del Benaco, Verona, Kingdom of Lombardy–Venetia	1922	Castelleto del Garda, Verona, Kingdom of Italy	Priest, founder of Little Sisters of the Holy Family
Blessed Mary Theresa Ledóchowska	1863	Loosdorf, Austrian Empire	1922	Rome, Italy	Foundress of the Missionary Sisters of St. Peter Claver
Blessed Columba Marmion	1858	Dublin, Ireland	1923	Maredsous Abbey, Belgium	Benedictine religious priest and abbot
Filippo Smaldone	1848	Naples, Italy	1923	Lecce, Italy	Priest, founder of the Salesian Sisters of the Sacred Hearts
Jozef Bilczewski	1860	Wilamowice, Austria-Hungary	1923	Lwów, Poland (now Ukraine)	Archbishop of Lviv
Blessed Luigi Tezza	1841	Conegliano, Treviso, Kingdom of Lombardy–Venetia	1923	Lima, Peru	Priest, member of Camillians, co-founder of Daughters of St. Camillus
Blessed Luigi Variara	1875	Viarigi, Asti, Kingdom of Italy	1923	San José de Cúcuta, Norte de Santander, Colombia	Priest and missionary of the Salesians of Don Bosco
Blessed Savina Petrilli	1851	Siena, Grand Duchy of Tuscany	1923	Siena, Kingdom of Italy	Foundress of Sisters of the Poor of Saint Catherine of Siena
Blessed Edward Poppe	1890	Temse, Belgium	1924	Moerzeke, Belgium	Priest
Blessed Franz Alexander Kern (Jakob)	1897	Vienna, Austria-Hungary	1924	Vienna General Hospital, Vienna, Austria-Hungary	Religious priest of the Premonstratensians
Józef Sebastian Pelczar	1842	Korczyna, Podkarpackie, Congress Poland	1924	Przemyśl, Podkarpackie, Second Polish Republic	Bishop of Przemyśl, co-founder of Sister Servants of the Most Sacred Heart of Jesus
Maria Bernarda Bütler	1848	Auw, Aargau, Switzerland	1924	Cartagena, Colombia	Founder of Congregation of the Franciscan Missionary Sisters of Mary, Help of Christians
Rafaela Porras Ayllón	1850	Pedro Abad, Córdoba, Kingdom of Spain	1925	Rome, Kingdom of Italy	Co-foundress of Handmaids of the Sacred Heart of Jesus
Anna Schaffer	1882	Mindelstetten, Bavaria, German Empire	1925	Mindelstetten, Bavaria, Germany	Virgin
Blessed Manuel Míguez González	1831	Xamirás, Ourense, Kingdom of Spain	1925	Getafe, Madrid, Kingdom of Spain	Piarist priest, founder of the Daughters of the Divine Shepherdess
Pier Giorgio Frassati	1901	Turin, Italy	1925	Turin, Italy	Member of Third Order of Saint Dominic
Bartolo Longo	1841	Latiano, Kingdom of the Two Sicilies	1926	Pompeii, Kingdom of Italy	Member of Third Order of Saint Dominic and Order of the Holy Sepulchre
Blessed Colomba Gabriel	1858	Ivano-Frankivsk, Galicia, Austrian Empire	1926	Rome, Kingdom of Italy	Foundress of Benedictine Sisters of Charity
Giuseppe Allamano	1851	Castelnuovo, Asti, Kingdom of Sardinia	1926	Turin, Kingdom of Italy	Founder of Consolata Missionaries and Consolata Missionary Sisters
Blessed Luigi Talamoni	1848	Monza, Kingdom of Italy	1926	Milan, Kingdom of Italy	Priest, founder of Merciful Sisters of Saint Gerard
Blessed Maria Theresa Chiramel	1876	Puthenchira, Thrissur, British India	1926	Kuzhikattussery, Thrissur, British India	Founder of Holy Family Congregation
Blessed Mariano de Jesús Euse Hoyos	1845	Yarumal, Antioquia, Colombia	1926	Angostura, Antioquia, Colombia	Priest
Blessed Maria Concepción Barrecheguren García	1905	Granada, Kingdom of Spain	1927	Granada	Laywoman, Virgin
David Uribe Velasco	1889	Buenavista de Cuéllar, Guerrero, México	1927	San José Vista Hermosa, Mexico	Priest, Martyr, Saints of the Cristero War
Jenaro Sanchez Delgadillo	1876	Agualele, Zapopan, Jalisco, Mexico	1927	La Loma, outside of Tecolotlán, Jalisco, México	Martyr, Saints of the Cristero War
Jose Isabel, Flores Varela, and Jose Maria Robles Hurtado		Mexico	1927	Mexico	Saints of the Cristero War
Cristóbal Magallanes Jara and companions	1869	Totatiche, Mexico	1927	Colotlán, Mexico	Priest and Martyr
Giuseppe Moscati	1880	Benevento, Italy	1927	Naples, Italy	Doctor of the Poor
Julio Alvarez Mendoza	1866	Guadalajara, Jalisco, Mexico	1927	San Julián, Mexico	
Mateo Correa Magallanes	1866	Tepechitlán, Mexico	1927	Durango, Mexico	Martyr, Saint of the Cristero War
Pedro Esqueda Ramirez	1887	San Juan de los Lagos, Mexico	1927	Teocaltitán, Mexico	Priest, Martyr, Saints of the Cristero War
Rodrigo Aguilar Aleman	1875	Sayula, Jalisco, Mexico	1927	Tula, Mexico	Martyr, Saint of the Cristero War
Blessed Domingo Iturrate Zubero	1901	Dima, Vizcaya, Kingdom of Spain	1927	Belmonte, Cuenca, Kingdom of Spain	Religious priest of the Trinitarians
Blessed Jurgis Matulaitis-Matulevičius	1871	Lūginė, Marijampolė, Lithuania	1927	Kaunas, Lithuania	Archbishop of Vilnius and founder of the Sisters of the Immaculate Conception of the Blessed Virgin Mary
Blessed Annibale Maria di Francia	1851	Messina, Italy	1927	Messina, Italy	Religious priest of the Rogationists
Blessed Miguel Pro	1891	Guadalupe, Mexico	1927	Mexico City	Religious priest of the Jesuits, martyr
Blessed Marie-Alphonsine Danil Ghattas	1843	Jerusalem, Ottoman Empire	1927	Ein Karem, British Mandatory Palestine	Foundress of the Dominican Sisters of the Most Holy Rosary of Jerusalem
Atilano Cruz Alvarado	1901	Teocaltiche, Mexico	1928	Cuquío, Mexico	Martyr, Saint of the Cristero War
Jesus Mendez Montoya	1880	Tarímbano, Michoacán, Mexico	1928	Valtierrilla, Guanajuato, Mexico	
Justino Orona Madrigal	1877	Atoyac, Jalisco, Mexico	1928	Cuquío, Jalisco, Mexico	Saint of the Cristero War
Toribio Romo González	1900	Jalostotitlán, Mexico	1928	Tequila, Mexico	Martyr, Saint of the Cristero War
Tranquilino Ubiarco Robles	1899	Zapotlán el Grande, Jalisco, Mexico	1928	Tepatitlán, Jalisco, Mexico	
Blessed Mateo Elías Nieves Castillo	1882	Yuriya, Guanajuato, Mexico	1928	Caraña de Caracheo, Guanajuato	Religious priest of the Order of Saint Augustine
Blessed Ivan Merz	1896	Banja Luka, Austria-Hungary	1928	Zagreb, Kingdom of Yugoslavia	Layman
Blessed Cecilia Eusepi	1910	Monte Romano, Italy	1928	Nepi, Italy	autobiography entitled "The Story of a Clown"
José Sánchez del Río	1913	Sahuayo, Mexico	1928	Sahuayo, Michoacán	Martyr, Saint of the Cristero War
Blessed Anton Maria Schwartz	1852	Baden, Lower Austria, Austrian Empire	1929	Vienna, First Austrian Republic	Priest, founder of the Congregation of the Christian Workers of Saint Joseph Calasanz
Blessed Dina Bélanger	1897	Québec, Canada	1929	Sillery, Quebec, Canada	Religious Sister of the Religious of Jesus and Mary
Blessed Francisco Garate	1857	Azpeitia, Spain	1929	Bilbao, Spain	Jesuit brother
Blessed Joseph-Mary Rubio y Peralta	1864	Dalías, Spain	1929	Aranjuez, Spain	Jesuit priest, apostle of Madrid
Blessed Giulia Salzano	1846	Santa María Capua Vetere, Province of Caserta, Kingdom of the Two Sicilies	1929	Casoria, Naples, Kingdom of Italy	Foundress of Catechetical Sisters of the Sacred Heart of Jesus
Riccardo Pampuri	1897	Trivolzio, Italy	1930	Milan, Italy	Member of the Brothers Hospitallers of Saint John of God
Blessed Louis Versiglia and Calixtus Caravario			1930	Li-Thau-Tseul, China	Martyr Saints of China
Blessed Irene Stefani	1891	Anfo, Italy	1930	Nyeri, Kenya	Religious sister of the Consolata Missionaries
Blessed Clelia Merloni	1861	Forlì, Italy	1930	Rome, Italy	Religious sister and founder of the Apostles of the Sacred Heart of Jesus
Blessed Darío Acosta Zurita	1908	Naolinco, Veracruz, Mexico	1931	Assumption Cathedral, Puerto de Veracruz, Mexico	Diocesan priest and martyr
Blessed Ignacy Kłopotowski	1866	Korzeniowka, Belsky Uyezd, Grodno Governorate	1931	Warsaw, Second Polish Republic	Priest, founder of the Sisters of the Blessed Virgin Mary of Loreto
Blessed László Batthyány-Strattmann	1870	Dunakiliti, Austria-Hungary	1931	Vienna, Austria	Physician, "doctor of the poor"
Blessed Philip Rinaldi	1856	Lu Monferrato, Alessandria, Kingdom of Piedmont-Sardinia	1931	Turin, Kingdom of Italy	Religious priest of the Salesians of Don Bosco
Saint Angela of the Cross	1846	Seville, Spain	1932	Seville, Spain	Religious sister and foundress of the Sisters of the Company of the Cross
Blessed Eurosia Fabris	1866	Quinto Vicentino, Italy	1932	Marola, Veneto, Italy	Laywoman, member of Third Order of Saint Francis
Cirilo Bertrán, Marciano José, Inocencio of Mary Immaculate, and companions			1934	Turón, Asturias, Spain	Martyrs of Turón
Blessed Maria Domenica Mantovani	1862	Castelletto di Brenzone, Verona, Kingdom of Lombardy–Venetia	1934	Verona, Kingdom of Italy	Co-founder of the Little Sisters of the Holy Family
Blessed Antonia Mesina	1919	Orgosolo, Sardinia	1935	Orgosolo, Sardinia, Kingdom of Italy	Virgin and martyr
Blessed Eusebia Palomino Yenes	1899	Cantalpino, Salamanca, Kingdom of Spain	1935	Valverde del Camino, Huelva, Second Spanish Republic	Member of the Salesian Sisters of Don Bosco
Blessed Leonid Feodorov	1879	Saint Petersburg, Russia	1935	Viatka, Russia	Studite hieromonk
Blessed Maria Karłowska	1865	Karłowo, Grand Duchy of Posen, Kingdom of Prussia	1935	Pniewite, Kujawsko-Pomorskie, Second Polish Republic	Foundress of the Sisters of the Divine Shepherd of Divine Providence
Blessed Pietro Bonilli	1841	San Lorenzo di Trevi, Perugia district, Papal States	1935	Spoleto, Perugia, Kingdom of Italy	Priest, founder of the Sisters of the Holy Family of Spoleto
Blessed Amparo Rosat Balasch and Maria del Calvario Romero Clariana			1936		
Blessed Giacinto Longhin	1863	Fiumicello di Campodarsego, Padua, Kingdom of Italy	1936	Treviso, Kingdom of Italy	Religious priest of the Order of Friars Minor Capuchin, Bishop of Treviso
Blessed Angela of Saint Joseph and companions			1936		
Blessed Bartolomé Blanco Marquez	1914	Pozoblanco, Spain	1936	Jaén, Spain	Martyr of the Spanish Civil War
Blessed Ceferino Giménez Malla	1861	Fraga, Spain	1936	Barbastro, Huesca Province, Spain	Martyr of the Spanish Civil War
Blessed Clemencia Riba Mestres and companions			1936		
Blessed Crescencia Valls Espí	1863	Onteniente, Spain	1936	Canals, Spain	Laywoman and martyr
Blessed Daniel Brottier	1876	La Ferté-Saint-Cyr, France	1936	Paris, France	Spiritan priest
Blessed Denis Pamplona and companions			1936		
Blessed Deogracias Palacios and companions			1936		
Blessed Dolores de Santa Eulalia Puig Bonany			1936		
Blessed Felipe de Jesus Munarriz and companions			1936		
Blessed Florentino Asensio Barroso	1877	Villasexmir, Valladolid, Kingdom of Spain	1936	Barbastro, Huesca, Second Spanish Republic	Apostolic Administrator of Barbastro
Blessed Jacinto Hoyuelos Gonzalo	1914		1936		
Blessed Jose Ruiz Bruixola	1857		1936		
Blessed Josefa de San Juan Ruano Garcia			1936		
Blessed Juan Bautista Ferreres Boluda	1861		1936		
Blessed Lucio Martinez Mancebo and companions			1936		
Blessed Maria Gabriela de Hinojosa Naveros and companions			1936		
Blessed Maria Sagrario	1881		1936		
Blessed María Teresa Ferragut Roig	1853	Algemesí, Valencia, Spain	1936	Alzira, Valencia, Spain	Laywoman; one of 233 Spanish Martyrs
Blessed Mary Ginard Marti	1894		1936		
Blessed Martyrs of Daimiel			1936	Daimiel, Second Spanish Republic	Religious priests and brothers of the Passionists
Blessed Mercè Prat i Prat	1880	Barcelona	1936	Barcelona	Religious sister of the Society of St. Teresa of Jesus, Virgin and martyr
Blessed Niceta Plaja Xifra de San Prudencia and companions			1936		
Blessed Pedro de Alcantara Villanueva Larrayoz	1881		1936		
Blessed Pedro Poveda Castroverde	1874	Linares, Spain	1936	Madrid	Priest, Martyr of the Spanish Civil War
Blessed Philip de Jesus Monarriz and companions			1936		
Blessed Proceso Ruiz Cascales and companions			1936		
Blessed Santiago Mestre Iborra de Rafelbunol	1909		1936		
Blessed Tomas Sitiar Fortia and companions			1936		
Blessed Victoria Díez Bustos de Molina	1903	Seville, Kingdom of Spain	1936	Hornachuelos, Córdoba, Second Spanish Republic	Layperson, Member of the Teresian Institute, Martyr
Blessed Vincente Soler	1867		1936		
Blesseds Carlos Erana Guruceta, Fidel Fuidio, and Jesus Hita			1936		
Blesseds Francisca de Rafelbunol (Maria Fenollosa Alcayna) and Jose Fenollosa Alcayna			1936		
Blesseds Jose Aparicio Sanz, Enrique Juan Requena, and Jose Perpina Nacher			1936		
Blesseds Jose Ferrer Esteve and Alfredo Parte Saiz			1936		
Blesseds Joseph Tapies Sirvant and Pascal Araguas Guardia			1936		
Blesseds Maria de Jesus, Dolores Aguiar-Mella Diaz, and Consuelo Aguiar-Mella Diaz			1936		
Blesseds Maria de la Purificacion Ximenez Ximenez, Maria Jesefa del Rio Messa, and Sofia Ximenez Ximenez			1936		
Blesseds Maria del Carmen Moreno Benitez and Maria Amparo Carbonell Munoz			1936		Salesian Sisters of Don Bosco
Blesseds Maria Jesus, Maria Veronica, Maria Felicidad Masia Ferragud			1936		
Blesseds Maria Pilar Martinez			1936		
Blesseds Pedro Ruiz de los Panos y Angel and Jose Sala Pico			1936		
Blesseds Rita Delores Pujalte and Francisca Aldea			1936		
Blesseds Manuel González-Serna and companions			1936		Martyrs of the Spanish Civil War
Jaime Hilario Barbal	1889	Enviny, Lleida, Kingdom of Spain	1937	La Oliva, Tarragona, Second Spanish Republic	Member of the Institute of the Brothers of the Christian Schools
André Bessette	1845	Mont-Saint-Grégoire, Quebec, British Province of Canada	1937	Montreal, Quebec, Canada	Religious brother of the Congregation of Holy Cross
Blessed Tobias Borras Roman	1861		1937		
Blessed Vicente Vilar David	1889	Manises, Valencia, Kingdom of Spain	1937	Manises, Valencia, Second Spanish Republic	Layperson and martyr
Blessed Enrico Rebuschini	1860	Gravedona, Como, Kingdom of Italy	1938	Cremona, Kingdom of Italy	Religioius priest of the Camillians
Faustina Kowalska	1905	Głogowiec, Łęczyca County, Congress Poland, Russian Empire	1938	Kraków, Second Polish Republic	Author of The Diary of Saint Maria Faustina Kowalska: Divine Mercy in My Soul
Blessed Julio Junyer Padern	1892		1938		
Rafael Arnaiz Barón	1911	Burgos, Kingdom of Spain	1938	Dueñas, Palencia, Second Spanish Republic	Trappist conventual oblate
Rafael Guizar Valencia	1878	Cotija, Mexico	1938	Mexico City, Mexico	Bishop of Veracruz
Blessed Alicja Kotowska	1899	Warsaw, Vistula Land, Russian Empire	1939	Wielka Piaśnica, Nazi Germany	One of the 108 Martyrs of World War Two
Blessed Anselm Polanco and Philip Ripoll Morata			1939		
Blessed Ursula Ledóchowska	1865	Loosdorf, Melk, Lower Austria, Austrian Empire	1939	Rome, Italy	Foundress of the Ursulines of the Agonizing Heart of Jesus
Blessed Agnes Phila and companions			1940	Songkhon, Thailand	Martyrs of Thailand
Ascensión Nicol y Goñi	1868	Tafalla, Navarre, Spanish State	1940	Pamplona, Navarre, Spain	Missionary to Peru and mother superior of the Congregation of Dominican Missionaries of the Rosary
Blessed Franciszek Rogaczewski	1892	Lipinki, West Prussia, German Empire	1940	Sztutowo, Poland	Priest and martyr
Luigi Orione	1872	Pontecurone, Kingdom of Italy	1940	Sanremo, Kingdom of Italy	Priest and founder of the Sons of Divine Providence
Blessed Manuel Gonzalez Garcia	1877	Seville, Kingdom of Spain	1940	Palencia, Francoist Spain	Bishop of Palencia
Blessed Maria Bernardina Jablonska	1878		1940		
Blessed Otto Neururer	1882	Piller, Tyrol, Austria-Hungary	1940	Buchenwald, Gau Thuringia, Germany	Martyr, priest
Blessed Philip Siphong Onphitak	1907	Nong Seng, Nakhon Phanom, Thailand	1940	Songkhon, Thailand	Martyrs of Thailand
Maximilian Kolbe	1894	Zduńska Wola, Russian Empire	1941	KL Auschwitz, German-Occupied Poland	Conventual Franciscan priest, martyr
Blessed Andriy Ishchak	1887	Mikołajów nad Dniestrem, Austrian Galicia, Austria-Hungary	1941	Sykhiv, Ukrainian SSR, Soviet Union	Ukrainian Greek Catholic priest and martyr
Blessed Yakym Senkivskyi	1896	Velyki Hayi, Kingdom of Galicia and Lodomeria	1941	Drohobych, Ukrainian SSR, Soviet Union	Ukrainian Greek Catholic priest and martyr
Blessed Elisa Angela Meneguzzi	1901	Abano Terme, Padua, Kingdom of Italy	1941	Dire Dawa, Ethiopia	Religious sister of the Sisters of Saint Francis de Sales, missionary
Blessed Mykola Konrad	1876	Strusów, Austrian Galicia, Austria-Hungary	1941	Stradch, Ukrainian SSR, Soviet Union	Ukrainian Catholic priest and martyr, member of Order of St Basil the Great
Blessed Secondo Pollo	1908	Caresanablot, Vercelli, Kingdom of Italy	1941	Cervice, Turin, Kingdom of Italy	Priest and chaplain
Blessed Volodymyr Pryjma	1906	Stradcz, Austrian Galicia, Austria-Hungary	1941	Stradch, Ukrainian SSR, Soviet Union	Ukrainian Greek Catholic layman, choir director and martyr
Leopold Mandić	1866	Herceg Novi, Kingdom of Dalmatia, Austrian Empire	1942	Padua, Kingdom of Italy	Capuchin priest
Teresa Benedicta of the Cross (Edith Stein)	1891	Breslau, Germany (now Wrocław, Poland)	1942	KL Auschwitz, German-Occupied Poland	Martyr, Jewish convert, Discalced Carmelite
Blessed Maria Restituta Kafka	1894	Husovice, Margraviate of Moravia, Austria-Hungary	1942	Vienna, Nazi Germany	Religious sister of the Franciscan Sisters of Christian Charity, Virgin and martyr
Blessed Mislav Bohatkiewicz	1904		1942		
Pauline of the Agonizing Heart of Jesus	1865	Vigolo Vattaro, County of Tyrol, Austria-Hungary	1942	Ipiranga, São Paulo, Brazil	Foundress of the Congregation of the Little Sisters of the Immaculate Conception
Blessed Piotr Edward Dankowski	1908	Jordanów, Poland	1942	Auschwitz, German-occupied Poland	Priest, 108 Martyrs of World War II
Blessed Emil Szramek	1887	Tworków, Poland	1942	Dachau concentration camp, Dachau, Germany	Priest and martyr
Blessed Janina Szymkowiak	1910	Możdżanów, Wielkopolskie, Province of Silesia	1942	Poznań, Wielkopolskie, General Government	Religious sister of the Daughters of the Sorrowful Mother of God
Titus Brandsma	1881	Oegeklooster, Friesland, Netherlands	1942	Dachau concentration camp, Bavaria, Nazi Germany	Martyr, religious priest of the Carmelites
Blessed Wojciech Nierychlewski	1903		1942		
Blessed Anthony Leszczewicz	1890		1943		
Blessed Bernhard Lichtenberg	1875		1943		
Blessed Maria Josefa Karolina Brader	1860		1943		
Blessed Jakob Gapp	1897		1943		
Blessed Maria Stella Mardosewicz and companions			1943		
Blessed Nazaire Marcii Mesa	1889		1943		
Blessed Franz Jägerstätter	1907	Sankt Radegund, Upper Austria	1943	Brandenburg-Görden Prison, Brandenburg an der Havel, Germany	Conscientious objector during WWII
Blesseds Józef and Wiktoria Ulma with Seven Children	1900/1944	Markowa, Congress Poland, Russian Empire	1944	Markowa, Occupied Poland	First fully beatified family
Blessed Omelyan Kovch	1884	Kosiv, Ivano-Frankivs’ka oblast, Ukraine	1944	Majdanek concentration camp	Ukrainian Greek Catholic priest and martyr of Nazi era
Blessed Nicholas Bunkerd Kitbamrung	1895	Nakhon Pathom, Thailand	1944	Bang Kwang Central Prison, Bangkok, Thailand	Priest and Martyr
Blessed Tarsykiya Matskiv	1919	Chodorów, Lwów Voivodeship, Second Polish Republic	1944	Chervonohrad, Ukrainian SSR, Soviet Union	Religious of Sisters Servants of Mary Immaculate, Martyr
Blessed Teresa Bracco	1924	Santa Giulia, Dego, Savona, Kingdom of Italy	1944	Santa Giulia, Dego, Savona, Kingdom of Italy	Religious and founder of Daughters of Providence, Widow, Martyr
Blessed Giuseppe Beotti	1912	Gragnano Trebbiense, Province of Piacenza, Kingdom of Italy	1944	Bardi, Province of Parma	Priest and martyr of Nazi era
Blessed Teresa Grillo Michel	1855	Spinetta Marengo, Kingdom of Sardinia	1944	Alessandria, Italian Social Republic	Foundress of the Little Sisters of Divine Providence
Blessed Karl Leisner	1915		1945		
Blessed Marcel Callo	1921		1945		
Blessed Maria Pilar Izquierdo Albero	1906		1945		
Blessed Maria Raffaella Cimatti	1861		1945		
Blessed Natalia Tułasiewicz	1906		1945		
Blessed Nikolaus Gross	1898		1945		
Blessed Peter To Rot	1912		1945		
Blessed Stefan Wincenty Frelichowski	1913	Chełmża, Kujawsko-Pomorskie, Congress Poland	1945	Dachau concentration camp, Dachau, Germany	
Blessed Alberto Marvelli	1918	Ferrara, Kingdom of Italy	1946	Rimini, Italy	Layman, member of the Catholic Action movement
Alphonsa Muttathupadathu	1910	Arpookara, Kerala, India	1946	Bharananganam, Kerala, India	Religious sister of the Franciscan Clarist Congregation
Blessed Bolesława Lament	1862	Łowicz, Warsaw Governorate, Congress Poland	1946	Białystok, Polish People's Republic	Religious sister and founder of the Missionary Sisters of the Holy Family
Blessed Vitalij Volodymyr Bajrak	1907	Shvaikivtsi, Ukraine, Russian Empire	1946	Drohobych, Ukrainian SSR, Soviet Union	Martyr, religious priest of the Order of Saint Basil the Great
Blessed Joseph Kugler	1867	Neuhaus, Bavaria	1946	Regensburg, Germany	Religious brother of the Brothers Hospitallers of Saint John of God
Josephine Bakhita	1869	Olgossa, Sultanate of Darfur (now Sudan)	1947	Schio, Veneto, Italy	Canossian religious sister
Blessed Hryhoriy Khomyshyn	1867	Hadynkivtsi, Ukraine, Russian Empire	1947	Kiev, Ukrainian SSR, Soviet Union	Ukrainian Greek Catholic bishop and martyr
Blessed Claudio Granzotto	1900	Santa Lucia di Piave, Treviso, Kingdom of Italy	1947	Padua, Italy	Religious brother of the Order of Friars Minor and a noted sculptor
Blessed Josaphat Kotsylovsky	1876	Pakoshivka, Ukraine, Russian Empire	1947	Przemyśl, Polish People's Republic	Bishop of Przemyśl, religious priest of the Order of Saint Basil the Great
Blessed Maria Giovanna Fasce	1881	Torriglia, Genoa, Kingdom of Italy	1947	Cascia, Perugia, Italy	Augustinian nun
Blessed Theodore Romzha	1911	Nagybocskó, Austria-Hungary (now Velykyi Bychkiv, Ukraine)	1947	Uzhhorod, Ukrainian SSR, Soviet Union	Bishop of Mukacheve
Blessed Jan Wojciech Balicki	1869	Staromieście, Rzeszów, Vistula Land	1948	Przemyśl, Polish People's Republic	Priest who served as a spiritual director to seminarians
Blessed Giuseppe Giaccardo	1896	Narzole, Cuneo, Kingdom of Italy	1948	Rome, Lazio, Italy	Religious priest of the Society of Saint Paul
Blessed Vicenta Chávez Orozco	1867	Cotija de la Paz, Michoacán de Ocampo, Mexico	1949	Guadalajara, Jalisco, Mexico	
Laura of Saint Catherine of Siena	1874	Jericó, Antioquía, Colombia	1949	Belencito, Medellín, Antioquía, Colombia	
Blessed Maria Candida of the Eucharist	1884	Catanzaro, Kingdom of Italy	1949	Ragusa, Italy	
Blessed Nykyta Budka	1877	Dobromirka, Austria-Hungary	1949	Karaganda, Soviet Union	
Blessed Roman Lysko	1914	Gródek, Austrian Galicia, Austro-Hungary	1949	Lviv, Ukrainian SSR, Soviet Union	
Blessed Hryhoriy Lakota	1883	Holodivka, Kingdom of Galicia and Lodomeria, Austria-Hungary	1950	Abezlag, near Vorkuta, Soviet Union	Auxiliary Bishop of Przemyśl, Martyr
Blessed Pere Tarrés i Claret	1905	Manresa, Barcelona, Kingdom of Spain	1950	Barcelona, Francoist Spain	Doctor, who became a priest
Blessed Giuseppina Suriano	1915	Partinico, Palermo, Kingdom of Italy	1950	Partinico, Palermo	Virgin, member of the Catholic Action movement
Artémides Zatti	1880	Boretto, Reggio Emilia, Kingdom of Italy	1951	Viedma, Río Negro, Argentina	Religious brother of the Salesians of Don Bosco and a noted pharmacist
Blessed Klymentiy Sheptytsky	1869	Prylbychi, Lviv Oblast, Kingdom of Galicia and Lodomeria, Austria-Hungary	1951	Vladimir Central Prison, Russian SFSR, Soviet Union	Religious priest of the Studite Brethren, Ukrainian Greek Catholic archimandrite and martyr
Blessed Enrichetta Alfieri	1891	Borgo Vercelli, Vercelli, Kingdom of Italy	1951	Milan	Religious sister of the Sisters of Divine Charity
Blessed Luigi Beltrame Quattrocchi	1880	Catania	1951	Rome	Along with his wife, married laypeople who became the first couple to be beatified together
Blessed Mykola Tsehelskyi	1896	Strusiv, Ternopil Region, Austria-Hungary	1951	Moldova SSR, Soviet Union	Ukrainian Greek Catholic priest, martyr
Blessed Zoltán Meszlényi	1892	Hatvan, Austria-Hungary	1951	Kistarcsa internment camp, Hungary	Auxiliary Bishop of Esztergom, martyr of communist era
Alberto Hurtado Cruchaga	1901	Viña del Mar, Chile	1952	Santiago, Chile	Jesuit priest, author of Is Chile a Catholic Country?, founder of the Chilean Trade Union Association
Euphrasia Eluvathingal	1877	Aranattukara, Thrissur, Kerala, India	1952	Ollur, Thrissur, Kerala, India	
Blessed Ivan Ziatyk	1899		1952		
Blessed Kamen Vitchev	1893		1952		
Blessed Josaphat Chichkov	1884		1952		
Blessed Laurentia Herasymiv	1911		1952		
Blessed Olympia Bida	1903		1952		
Blessed Paolo Manna	1872	Avellino, Kingdom of Italy	1952	Naples, Italy	
Blessed Pavel Djidjov	1919		1952		
Blessed Eugene Bossilkov	1900		1952		
Blessed Alfredo Ildefonso Schuster	1880	Rome, Italy	1954	Venegono Inferiore near Milan, Italy	Religious priest of the Benedictines, Archbishop of Milan and Cardinal
Giovanni Calabria	1873	Verona, Kingdom of Italy	1954	Verona, Italy	Founder of the Poor Servants of Divine Providence and the Poor Sisters Servants of Divine Providence
Blessed Alexandrina Maria da Costa	1904	Balazar, Póvoa de Varzim, Kingdom of Portugal	1955	Balazar, Póvoa de Varzim, Portugal	Mystic and victim soul, member of the Association of Salesian Cooperators
Katharine Drexel	1858	Philadelphia, Pennsylvania, U.S.	1955	Bensalem, Pennsylvania, U.S.	Foundress of the Sisters of the Blessed Sacrament
Blessed Euthymia Üffing	1914	Halverde, North Rhine-Westphalia, German Empire	1955	Münster, North Rhine-Westphalia, West Germany	Religious sister of the Sisters of Charity of the Blessed Virgin and Our Lady of Sorrows
Blessed Cecília Schelingová	1916	Krivá na Orave, Dolný Kubín, Austria-Hungary	1955	Trnava, Czechoslovakia	Religious sister of the Congregation of the Sisters of Charity of the Holy Cross
Genoveva Torres Morales	1870	Almenara, Castellón, Spain	1956	Zaragoza, Spain	Foundress of Daughters of the Sacred Heart of Jesus and of the Holy Angels
Blessed Carlo Gnocchi	1902	San Colombano al Lambro, Italy	1956	Milan, Italy	Priest
Blessed Maria Crocifissa Curcio	1877	Ispica, Ragusa, Kingdom of Italy	1957	Santa Marinella, Rome, Italy	Foundress of the Carmelite Missionary Sisters of Saint Therese of the Child Jesus
Mary Elisabeth Hesselblad	1870	Fåglavik, Västra Götaland County, Sweden	1957	Rome, Italy	Founder of a branch of the Bridgettines known as the Bridgettine Sisters, Virgin
Blessed Petro Werhun	1890		1957		
Blessed Pierina Morosini	1931	Fiobbio, Albino, Bergamo, Kingdom of Italy	1957	Fiobbio, Albino, Bergamo, Italy	Member of the Catholic Action movement; Virgin and martyr
Blessed Solanus Casey	1870	Oak Grove, Wisconsin, U.S.	1957	Detroit, Michigan, U.S.	Religious priest of the Order of Friars Minor Capuchin
Blessed Nicola da Gesturi	1882	Gesturi, Italy	1958	Cagliari, Italy	Religious brother of the Order of Friars Minor Capuchin
María Natividad Venegas de la Torre	1868	Zapotlanejo, Jalisco, Mexico	1959	Guadalajara, Jalisco, Mexico	Religious sister, founder of the Daughters of the Sacred Heart of Jesus of Guadalajara
Blessed Dominik Trčka	1886	Frýdlant nad Ostravicí, Austria-Hungary	1959	Leopoldov Prison, Czechoslovakia	Religious priest of the Redemptorists, Martyr
Blessed Nicholas Charnetsky	1884	Semakivtsi, Kolomyia Raion, Ukraine	1959	Ukraine	Bishop and religious priest of the Redemptorists, Martyr
Blessed Aloysius Stepinac	1898	Brezarić, Austria-Hungary (now Croatia)	1960	Krašić, Yugoslavia (now Croatia)	Archbishop of Zagreb and Cardinal
Blessed Pavel Peter Gojdič	1888	Ruské Pekľany, Austria-Hungary	1960	Leopoldov, Czechoslovak Socialist Republic	Bishop of Prešov
Gianna Beretta Molla	1922	Magenta, Italy	1962	Magenta, Italy	Laywoman, Pediatrician, involved in Catholic Action and Society of Saint Vincent de Paul
Blessed Maria Ludovica de Angelis	1880		1962		
Abdel Messih El-Makari	1892	Matai, Khedivate of Egypt, Ottoman Empire	1963	Matai, Egypt	Coptic Orthodox monk and priest
Blessed Carlos Manuel Rodríguez Santiago	1918	Caguas, Puerto Rico	1963	Río Piedras, Puerto Rico	Layperson, catechist and liturgist
John XXIII (Angelo Giuseppe Roncalli)	1881	Sotto il Monte Giovanni XXIII, Italy	1963	Vatican City	Pope, began Second Vatican Council
María Guadalupe García Zavala	1878	Zapopan, Jalisco, Mexico	1963	Guadalajara, Jalisco, Mexico	Religious sister and the co-founder of the Handmaids of Santa Margherita and the Poor
Blessed Oleksiy Zarytskyi	1912		1963		
Blessed Marie-Clémentine Anuarite Nengapeta	1939	Wamba, Haut-Uele, Orientale, Democratic Republic of Congo	1964	Isiro, Haut-Uele, Orientale, Democratic Republic of Congo	Martyr and member of the Sisters of the Holy Family
Blessed Cyprian Michael Iwene Tansi	1903	Aguleri, Southern Nigeria Protectorate	1964	Leicester, England	Trappist priest
Blessed Symeon Lukach	1893	Starunya, Kingdom of Galicia and Lodomeria, Austrian-Hungarian Empire	1964	Starunya, Ukrainian Soviet Socialist Republic, Soviet Union	Ukrainian Greek Catholic bishop and martyr
Blessed Maria Corsini Beltrame Quattrocchi	1884	Florence	1965	Serravalle di Bibbiena	Along with her husband, married laypeople who became the first couple to be beatified together
Blessed Marija Petković	1892	Blato, Kingdom of Dalmatia, Austria-Hungary (modern-day Croatia)	1966	Rome, Italy	Founder of the Congregation of the Daughters of Mercy
Blessed Laura Evangelista Alvarado Cardozo	1875	Choroní, Aragua, Venezuela	1967	Maracay, Aragua, Venezuela	Religious sister, founder of the Augustinian Recollect Sisters of the Heart of Jesus
Pio of Pietrelcina	1887	Pietrelcina, Province of Benevento, Kingdom of Italy	1968	San Giovanni Rotondo, Foggia, Italy	Capuchin priest, known as 'Padre Pio'
Blessed Maria Troncatti	1883	Brescia, Italy	1969	Morona-Santiago, Ecuador	Religious sister of the Salesian Sisters of Don Bosco
Blessed Giacomo Alberione	1884	Fossano, Province of Cuneo, Kingdom of Italy	1971	Rome, Lazio, Italy	Priest, religious founder and publisher
Blessed Thevarparampil Kunjachan	1891	Ramapuram, Travancore (present-day Kerala, India)	1973	Ramapuram, Kerala, India	Priest of the Syro-Malabar Church
Blessed Vasyl Velychkovsky	1903	Stanislaviv, Austria-Hungary	1973	Winnipeg, Manitoba, Canada	Religious priest of the Redemptorists
María de las Maravillas de Jesús	1891	Madrid, Kingdom of Spain	1974	La Aldehuela, Madrid, Francoist Spain	Discalced Carmelite
Blessed Michael Sopocko	1888	Juszewszczyzna, Ashmyany, Poland	1975	Białystok, Poland	Priest, spiritual director of Saint Faustina Kowalska
Josemaria Escriva de Balaguer	1902	Barbastro, Spain	1975	Rome	Priest, founder of the Opus Dei
Blessed Gabriele Allegra	1907	San Giovanni la Punta, Italy	1976	Hong Kong	Translator of Chinese Catholic Bible
Blessed Vasil Hopko	1904	Hrabské, Austria-Hungary (now Slovakia)	1976	Prešov, Slovakia	Auxiliary Bishop of Prešov
Blessed Maria Romero Meneses	1902	Granada, Nicaragua	1977	León, Nicaragua	Religious sister, known for her work with the poor in Costa Rica
Paul VI (Giovanni Battista Montini)	1897	Concesio, Italy	1978	Vatican City	Pope
Blessed John Paul I (Albino Luciani)	1912	Canale d'Agordo, Italy	1978	Vatican City	Pope
Óscar Romero	1917	Ciudad Barrios, San Miguel, El Salvador	1980	San Salvador	Archbishop of San Salvador, shot during Mass
Blessed Stefan Wyszyński	1901	Zuzela, Poland	1981	Warsaw, Poland	Cardinal, Primate of the Millennium
Blessed Stanley Rother	1935	Okarche, Oklahoma, United States	1981	Santiago Atitlán, Guatemala	Missionary priest in Guatemala, murdered by gunmen at the rectory of the church
Blessed Isabel Cristina Mrad Campos	1962	Barbacena, Minas Gerais, Brazil	1982	Juiz de Fora, Minas Gerais, Brazil	Virgin and martyr
Blessed Jerzy Popiełuszko	1947	Okopy, near Suchowola, Republic of Poland	1984	Włocławek, Polish People's Republic	Priest and martyr
Blessed Sandra Sabattini	1961	Riccione, Rimini, Italy	1984	Bologna, Italy	Coma due to car accident
Blessed Chiara Badano	1971	Sassello, Italy	1990	Sassello, Italy	Member of Focolare Movement
Blessed Benedict Daswa	1946	Limpopo, South Africa	1990	Limpopo, South Africa	Murdered by local mob
Blessed Rosario Livatino	1952	Sicily, Italy	1990	Sicily, Italy	Murdered by Stidda
Blessed Elisabetta Martinez	1905	Galatina, Italy	1991	Rome, Italy	Founder of the Daughters of St. Mary of Leuca
Dulce de Souza Lopes Pontes	1914	Salvador, Bahia, Brazil	1992	Salvador, Bahia, Brazil	Charitable Works Foundation of Sister Dulce
Blessed Pino Puglisi	1937	Palermo, Italy	1993	Palermo, Italy	Murdered by Italian Mafia
Blessed Alvaro del Portillo	1914	Madrid, Spain	1994	Rome, Italy	Bishop, Prelate of Opus Dei
Blessed Esther Paniagua Alonso	1949	Izagre, Spain	1994	Algiers, Algeria	Religious sister of the Augustinian missionaries, murdered by the Armed Islamic Group of Algeria
Blessed Gaetana Tolomeo	1936	Catanzaro, Kingdom of Italy	1997	Catanzaro, Italy	Laywoman, member of the Catholic Action movement
Teresa of Calcutta	1910	Skopje, Ottoman Empire	1997	Calcutta, India	Religious sister, founder of the Missionaries of Charity, known as 'Mother Teresa'
Blessed Eduardo Francisco Pironio	1920	Buenos Aires, Argentina	1998	Rome, Italy	Cardinal, member of the Roman Curia
María de la Purísima Salvat Romero	1926	Madrid, Spain	1998	Seville, Spain	Religious sister of the Sisters of the Company of the Cross
Blessed Maria Laura Mainetti	1939	Colico, Italy	2000	Chiavenna, Italy	Sister of the Cross, martyred in satanic sacrifice

== See also ==
- Christianity in the 20th century
- List of saints canonized in the 20th century
- Chronological list of saints and blesseds in the 21st century, including Pope John Paul II, Carlo Acutis and others.
