= Blessed Andrew =

Blessed Andrew may refer to:

- Andrea Gallerani
- Andrew of Sandomierz
- André Abellon
- Andrea da Segni
- André de Soveral
- Andrew of Phu Yen
- André-Abel Alricy
- Andé Angar
- Andrea Carlo Ferrari
- Andrea Giacinto Longhin
- Andriy Ishchak
- Andrés Solá y Molist
