= Matilde of the Sacred Heart =

Blessed Matilde of the Sacred Heart

Virgin
- Born: 30 May 1841; Robledillo de la Vera, Cáceres, Kingdom of Spain
- Died: 17 December 1902; Don Benito, Badajoz, Kingdom of Spain
- Venerated in: Roman Catholic Church
- Beatified: 21 March 2004, Saint Peter's Square, Vatican City by Pope John Paul II
- Feast: 30 May
- Patronage: Hijas de María Madre de la Iglesia

Matilde of the Sacred Heart (30 May 1841 - 17 December 1902), born Matilde Téllez Robles, was a Spanish nun and the foundress of the congregation of the Hijas de María Madre de la Iglesia.

Téllez Robles was an active participant in her parish during her adolescence and was part of several faith-related organizations until her desire for the religious life led her to establish a congregation dedicated to both the care of the poor and ill and the education of children. Her congregation's foundation was first mired in a lack of membership, though the number increased as houses were established and their works grew.

Her beatification was held on 21 March 2004.

== Life ==
Matilde Téllez Robles was born on 30 May 1841 in Robledillo de la Vera as the second of four children to Félix Telléz i Gomez Basilea Robles i Ruiz; she was baptized on 31 May. Her parents decided later in 1851 that all would relocate to Béjar in Salamanca where her parents enrolled her in a private school.

But as an adolescent she felt called to commit her entire life to the worship and the service of God to which she encountered the strong opposition of her father who wanted her to get married; he even tried to control her religious practices. Téllez found the support that she needed in the association of the Hijas de María. Téllez spent her time at home in silent reflection when she was not occupied with caring for the sick and the poor. But she also felt called to found a religious order that was dedicated to Eucharistic Adoration and caring for those who needed help the most. In this she found the support of both her father (who relented to her desires) and her spiritual director Manuel de la Oliva. Téllez acquired a house for the point of housing herself and eight members of Hijas de María who had committed themselves to joining her in this endeavor.

But on 19 March 1875 - the chosen time for the occupation of the house and beginning the work of the group - just one member besides Téllez Robles showed up: María Briz (c. 1852–1885). Briz spent the remainder of her life as the companion to Téllez Robles who was determined to proceed with the foundation of the new order and the two assumed the habit for the first time on 20 January 1878. The pair worked with orphaned children (she opened a school for them) but also with the poor and the sick. More women joined the two at a slow pace and the need for larger lodgings came once the group had risen to six members. Soon a new house was found in Don Benito where the group moved in March 1879 and where Téllez opened a school and novitiate for new candidates. Her order received diocesan approval on 19 March 1884 from the Bishop of Plasencia Pedro Casas i Souto which allowed for her and some other sisters to make their religious vows on the following 29 June. But tragic circumstances in 1885 saw a cholera outbreak claim Briz. In 1889 a new house was opened in Cáceres while other houses were later opened in Trujillo and Almendralejo as well as in Los Santos de Maimona.

Téllez Robles died at the motherhouse in Don Benito on 17 December 1902 after suffering from a stroke on 15 December. In 2005 her order had 261 religious in 41 houses in nations such as Mexico and Portugal. Her order received the papal decree of praise from Pope Pius XI on 12 May 1930 while Pope Pius XII granted pontifical approval to their work on 6 May 1941.

== Beatification ==
The process for her beatification opened on 15 December 1977 under Pope Paul VI after the Congregation for the Causes of Saints issued the nihil obstat to the cause and titled the late religious as a Servant of God while the cognitional process for collecting documentation took place in Plasencia from 10 November 1979 to 26 April 1980. The congregation later validated this process after receiving the documents on 13 November 1992 and then received the Positio dossier from cause officials in 1994. Historians approved the dossier on 22 February 1994 as did the theologians on 4 December 2001 and the congregation on 15 January 2002. On 23 April 2002 she was titled venerable after Pope John Paul II confirmed that she had lived a life of heroic virtue.

One miracle was required for her to be beatified. One such case was investigated and received congregation validation on 5 February 2000 before medical experts approved the miraculous circumstances of the healing on 14 November 2002. Theologians also approved it on 4 February 2003 as being a miracle attributed to the late nun while the congregation confirmed the findings of the two previous panels on 8 April 2003. John Paul II approved this miracle on 12 April 2003 and beatified the late nun on 21 March 2004 in Saint Peter's Square. The postulator for the cause is Antonio Sáez de Albéniz.
