= Darío Acosta Zurita =

Blessed Darío Acosta Zurita
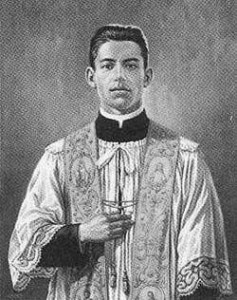
- Portrait of Dario Acosta Zurita

Priest and Martyr
- Born: 14 December 1908; Naolinco, Veracruz, Mexico
- Died: 25 July 1931 (aged 22); Assumption Cathedral, Puerto de Veracruz, Veracruz, Mexico
- Venerated in: Roman Catholic Church
- Beatified: 20 November 2005, Jalisco Stadium, Guadalajara, Mexico by Cardinal José Saraiva Martins
- Feast: 25 July
- Attributes: Priest's attire; Palm branch
- Patronage: Persecuted Christians; Catechists; Athletes

Darío Acosta Zurita (14 December 1908 – 25 July 1931) was a Mexican Roman Catholic priest who ministered in Veracruz where he lived and was killed. Zurita commenced his studies for the priesthood after he had once been refused entrance and he became known as an athletic seminarian. Bishop Rafael Guízar Valencia ordained him in 1931 and he was killed three months later after gunmen stormed the cathedral – enacting the so-called Tejeda Law – and shot him dead.

Zurita's beatification cause commenced under Pope John Paul II on 3 September 1988 and he was beatified under Pope Benedict XVI on 20 November 2005 after the latter confirmed that Zurita had been killed 'in odium fidei' – in hatred of the faith. Cardinal José Saraiva Martins presided over the beatification on the pontiff's behalf in Guadalajara.

== Life ==
Darío Acosta Zurita was born in Naolinco, Mexico on 14 December 1908 as one of five children to Leopoldo Acosta and Dominga Zurita. His sole sister was Elisa while two brothers were Heriberto and Vicente and then Leopoldo who was the last. He was baptized in the parish church of Saint Matthew the Apostle. His mother instilled in him a Christian education while his father worked as a butcher – his father later died in his childhood and he was forced to find work to support his mother and siblings.

Bishop Rafael Guízar Valencia visited Veracruz looking for potential seminarians at the time that Zurita had discerned that his call was to that of the religious life, though the bishop refused to accept him for he was still looking after his mother and was not considered old enough. His mother then traveled to Xalapa to meet the bishop and begged him to accept her son; the bishop relented and allowed him to commence his ecclesiastical studies. He was known for his athleticism and his gentle and charitable nature. Zurita was soon named as the captain of the seminarians' football team.

Bishop Guízar ordained him to the priesthood on 25 April 1931 and Zurita celebrated his first Mass at the Parish of the Assumption on 24 May 1931. He devoted his pastoral mission to instructing children in catechism and to the sacrament of confession. On 26 May 1931 he was appointed as the coadjutor vicar.

In mid-1931 a law titled Decree 197 – known as the Tejeda Law – was implemented in order to stop the so-called "fanaticism of the people" as the governor Adalberto Tejeda Olivares put it. The governor led the anti-religious charge and had designed the law to reign in the power of the churches in the area. Zurita remained calm and placed his faith in God once he received his letter – designated as number 759 rather than in name – on 21 July 1931. He would call fellow vicars to assess the situation though all were of the mindset that their sole role was to cater to the needs of the faithful rather than to the wishes of the government. All priests were sent the same letter demanding that they cooperate with the government and remain faithful to the contents of this law. This law entered into force on 25 July 1931.

On 25 July 1931 at 6:10 pm several men in militia raincoats entered the cathedral of the Assumption and without warning unleashed a barrage of bullets at the two priests present in the room. One sustained grave injuries while another – Father Rosas – escaped death when he hid in the pulpit. Zurita had just baptized a child in the adjacent room before coming into the main section of the cathedral and was at once shot several times. He fell to the ground and exclaimed "Jesus!" before he died. His death – which occurred on a Saturday – took place while children were present for a catechism class he was about to start. Zurita had been a priest for three months.

== Beatification ==
The beatification cause opened under Pope John Paul II on 3 September 1988 in a move that titled Zurita as a Servant of God. The Congregation for the Causes of Saints validated this process on 25 February 2000.

The Positio was submitted to the C.C.S. in 2004 and was passed onto theologians on 15 May 2004 for their assessment in which the cause received approval. The cardinal and bishop members of the C.C.S. also met to discuss the cause on 15 June 2004 and also responded in the affirmative, while John Paul II offered his definitive approval to the beatification on 22 June 2004.

Zurita's beatification was celebrated under Pope Benedict XVI on 20 November 2005 in Guadalajara with Cardinal José Saraiva Martins presiding over the celebration on the behalf of the pontiff.
