= Ulrika Nisch =

German Roman Catholic nun

Blessed Franziska Nisch
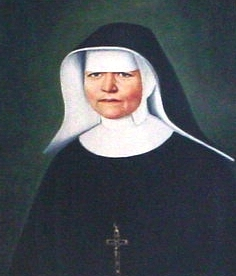
- Born: 18 September 1882; Oberdorf, German Empire
- Died: 8 May 1913 (aged 30); Allensbach, German Empire
- Venerated in: Roman Catholic Church
- Beatified: 1 November 1987, Saint Peter's Square, Vatican City by Pope John Paul II
- Feast: 8 May

Ulrika Nisch, SCSC, sometimes called Ulrika of Hegne (born Franziska Nisch, 18 September 1882 – 8 May 1913) was a German religious sister of the Sisters of Mercy of the Holy Cross of Ingenbohl.

She performed a wide range of tasks to cater to the needs of those who needed help. Pope John Paul II presided over her beatification on 1 November 1987.

== Life ==
Franziska Nisch was born on 18 September 1882 as the first of eleven children. Her parents were poor. Following her education she had no choice but to support her parents and siblings and also donated her services to other families.

She was struck with a severe ailment in 1903 and was admitted to a hospital where she met sisters of the religious congregation Barmherzige Schwestern vom heiligen Kreuz ("Sisters of Mercy of the Holy Cross"). After some exposure to them her feeling that she should join religious life grew and she decided that her true mission was to become a religious sister. She was allowed admittance into the congregation and at the age of 22, she entered the monastery of Hegne on the shores of Lake Constance. On her investiture she got the religious name Ulrika. Sr. Ulrika made her first vows on 24 April 1907. Nisch worked in the kitchens of houses in Bühl and Baden-Baden. She spent many hours in meditation and prayer. In 1912 she returned to Hegne, seriously ill with tuberculosis, where she spent the last months of her life in the hospital. Sister Ulrika died on May 8, 1913 at the age of 30. Her grave is in the crypt of the monastery of Hegne.

== Beatification ==
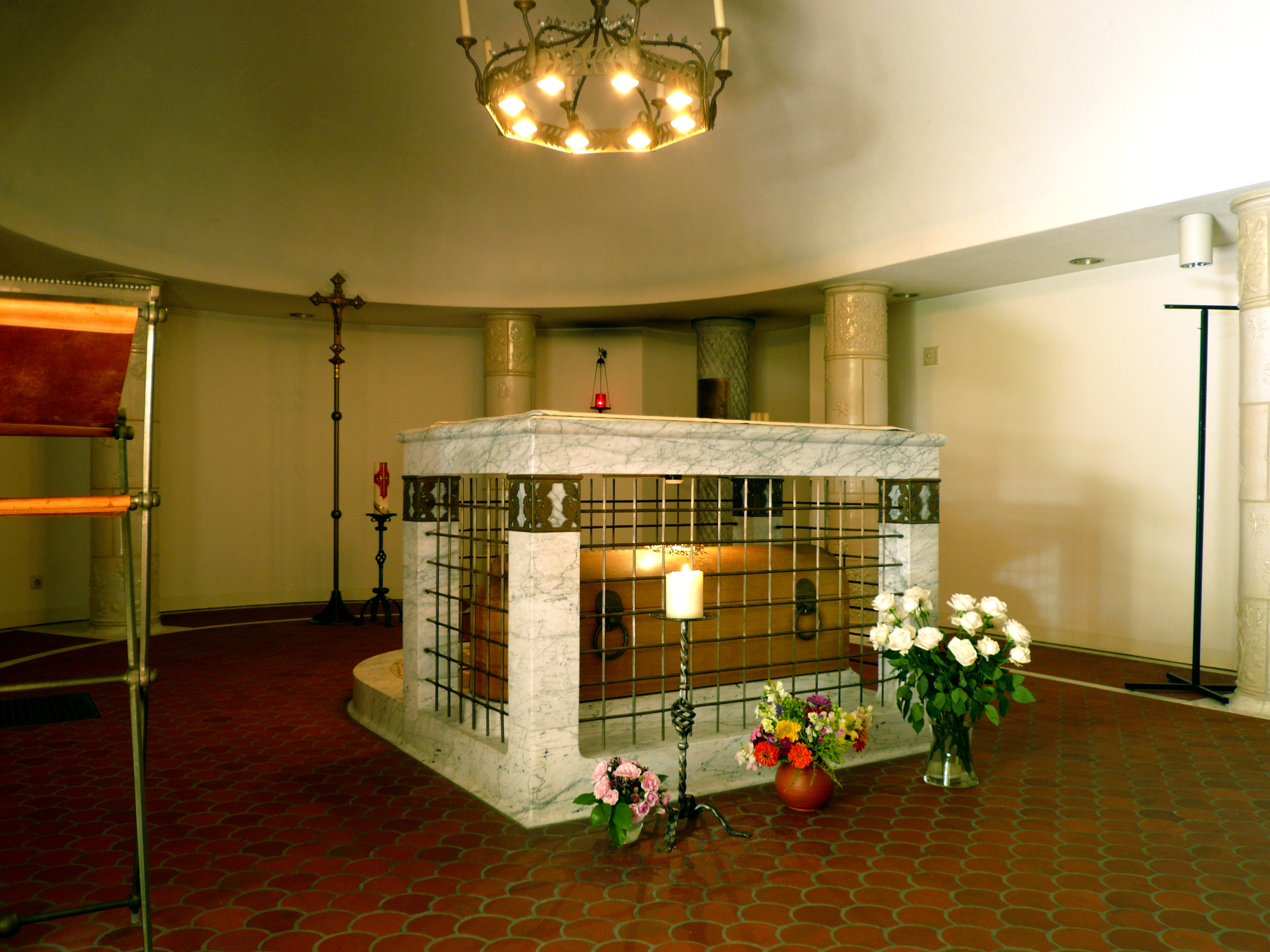
Tomb of Blessed Ulrika von Hegne at the monastery of Hegne

The beatification process commenced in Freiburg in a local diocesan tribunal on 24 November 1952 and concluded on 10 August 1953. This occurred despite the fact that the cause did not open on a formal level until 31 July 1981 which granted her the title Servant of God. The positio was compiled after the diocesan process and was submitted to the Congregation for the Causes of Saints in Rome in 1983. Pope John Paul II declared her to be venerable on 14 December 1984.

The diocesan tribunal for a miracle attributed to her intercession opened on 17 December 1979 and it concluded its investigation on 4 June 1981; it received its formal ratification to confirm the process was valid on 18 November 1983. Pope John Paul II approved a miraculous healing in 1987 that was attributed to Nisch's intercession and beatified her on 1 November 1987.
