= Maria Concepción Barrecheguren García =

Young Spanish Catholic

Blessed Maria Concepción Barrecheguren García
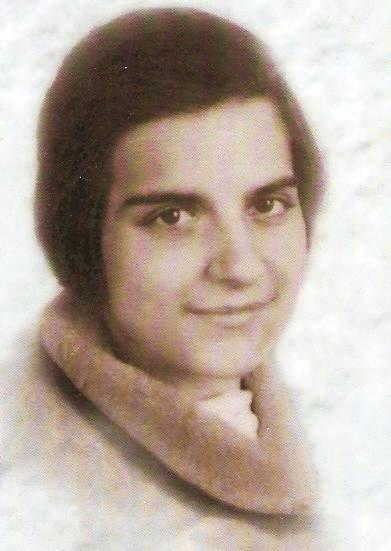

Virgin
- Born: 27 November 1905; Granada, Kingdom of Spain
- Died: 13 May 1927 (aged 21); Granada
- Venerated in: Roman Catholic Church
- Beatified: 6 May 2023, Granada Cathedral, Granada, Spain by Cardinal Marcello Semeraro
- Feast: 13 May

Maria Concepción Barrecheguren García (27 November 1905 – 13 May 1927), also known as Conchita Barrecheguren, was a young Spanish Catholic laywoman. She was beatified on 6 May, 2023.

== Early life ==
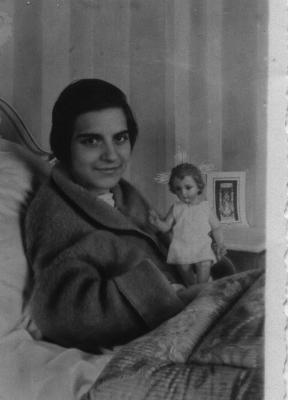
Conchita Barrecheguren in her bed, with a statue of the Christ Child

Maria Concepción Barrecheguren García was born on November 27, 1905, in Granada. She was the only child of the couple Francisco Barrecheguren and Concha García, both from wealthy and religious families. She was baptized on December 8, 1905, on the Solemnity of the Immaculate Conception of the Blessed Virgin Mary. When she was just over a year and a half old, she was diagnosed with acute enterocolitis, so much so that her life was feared. The girl soon recovered, being attributed to Our Lady of Lourdes. From an early age, Barrecheguren had health problems, as a result of which she did not attend school. Her father was responsible for educating her in social and catechetical principles. The quality of the teachings transmitted by her father allowed her to receive the Sacrament of Confirmation and the First Communion.

Since childhood, Barrecheguren wanted to lead a consecrated religious life. However, later illnesses formed an obstacle to her joining the monastic life. In 1917, she was diagnosed with an intestinal infection, which caused her a lot of pain and required a special diet. Barrecheguren patiently accepted her condition, seeing in it an opportunity to better surrender herself to God.

In 1924, she was stricken with a mental illness inherited from her mother. With fragile health, she was admitted to the Sanatorium of La Purissima, in Granada. Isolated from society, she devoted herself to Saint Thérèse of Lisieux. While she was hospitalized, she testified to her faith by praying and showing trust in God. She also used to chronicle reporting and writing personal notes. Despite poor health, in August 1926 she made a pilgrimage to Lisieux, where she contracted tuberculosis.

Seeking to improve from the new illness she contracted, she moved with her parents to the Carmine di San Valentino, in Alhambra, but the illness got worse. The last months of Barrecheguren's life were marked by total dependence on caregivers. All were unanimous in reporting her joy and patience when sick. The rest of her life was also marked by the many times she received the Eucharist.

Barrecheguren died on May 13, 1927, aged 22, due to tuberculosis. She was initially buried in her family's tomb in Granada. On May 13, 1978, the remains were transferred to the Carmelo di Conchita, in Alhambra and, since November 29, 2007, she has been buried in the Redemptorist Sanctuary of Our Lady of Perpetual Help.

== Beatification ==
Barreguren's beatification process was opened on 15 April 1946, granting her the title of Servant of God. A archdiocesan inquiry into her writings and testimonies about her life was completed in 1956 and sent to Rome for examination by the Dicastery for the Causes of Saints.

On 5 May, 2020, Pope Francis recognized Barrecheguren's heroic virtue, declaring her venerable. On the same day, her father Francisco was also declared venerable. On May 21, 2022, a decree was signed recognizing the miracle obtained through her intercession.

On May 6, 2023, she was beatified in the Granada Cathedral. The celebrant chosen to represent Pope Francis was Cardinal Marcello Semeraro, who inscribed her on the list of Blesseds of the Catholic Church. Her liturgical memory is celebrated on May 13.
