= Elisabetta Martinez =

Italian Religious and Founderh

Blessed Elisabetta Martinez DML

Virgin
- Born: 25 March 1905; Galatina, Kingdom of Italy
- Died: 8 February 1991 (aged 85); Rome, Italy
- Venerated in: Roman Catholic Church
- Beatified: 25 June 2023, Piazza Giovanni XXIII, Lecce, Italy by Cardinal Marcello Semeraro
- Feast: 8 February

Elisabetta "Elisa" Martinez DML (25 March 1905 – 8 February 1991) was an Italian Catholic nun and founder of the congregation of the Daughters of Saint Mary of Leuca. She was beatified on June 25, 2023 in Lecce.

== Early life ==
Born in Galatina, Kingdom of Italy, on March 25, 1905, she was the eldest of eight children of Giacomo Martinez and Francesca Rizzelli.

She grew up in a Catholic family thanks to her mother. Her father, however, disagreed about her initiation into the Catholic faith, but she was baptized with her consent on April 16, 1905, in the Parish of the Holy Apostles Peter and Paul, in Galatina. Despite disagreements with his father, in April 1928 she entered religious life, choosing the Congregation of Our Lady of Charity of the Good Shepherd. After her admission, she moved to the house of the congregation, located in Chieti, in April 1928. On September 29 of the same year, she was admitted to the religious habit. On September 29 of the following year, she made her first profession of vows, taking the religious name of Lucia. However, due to a severe lung infection, she had to leave the institute.

On March 20, 1938, with the help of the parish priest of Miggiano, Father Luigi Cosi, and with the consent of the bishop of Ugento, Giuseppe Ruotolo, she founded the Pious Union of Sisters of the Immaculate Conception. On August 15, 1941, the union was recognized as an institute. However, she decided to rename it the congregation of the Daughters of St. Mary of Leuca, thus honoring of the Marian shrine in the city of Leuca.

In later years, Elisabetta toured throughout Italy and abroad, thus strengthening her congregation and resisting trials and slander. She worked as Superior General for most of her life, resigning in 1987. She died in the general house of the Daughters of St. Mary of Leuca, located in Rome, on February 8, 1991. Her remains currently rest in the General House on Via Tiberina, Rome.

== Beatification ==
The process of her beatification began on July 29, 2016, in the Diocese of Leuca. The Roman phase of the trial began on September 14, 2018. On April 20, 2021, the Peculiar Congress of Theological Consultors obtained a positive result for the cause, followed by the approval of the Plenary Assembly of member Cardinals and Bishops of the Dicastery for the Causes of Saints on September 28, 2021. On October 13, 2021, Pope Francis issued the decree recognizing Martinez's heroic virtues. On February 23, 2023, a miracle attributed to her intercession was recognized.

Her beatification took place on June 25, 2023. The ceremony was presided over by Cardinal Marcello Semeraro in Piazza Giovanni XXIII, in front of the Sanctuary of Santa Maria de Leuca.
