= Pierre-Joseph Cassant =

Blessed Pierre-Joseph Cassant O.C.S.O.
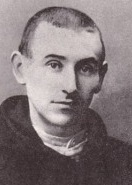

Priest
- Born: 6 March 1878; Casseneuil, Lot-et-Garonne, French Third Republic
- Died: 17 June 1903 (aged 25); Lévignac, Haute Garonne, French Third Republic
- Venerated in: Roman Catholic Church
- Beatified: 3 October 2004, Saint Peter's Square, Vatican City by Pope John Paul II
- Feast: 17 June
- Attributes: Cassock; Trappist habit
- Patronage: Casseneuil; People with learning difficulties; Examiners

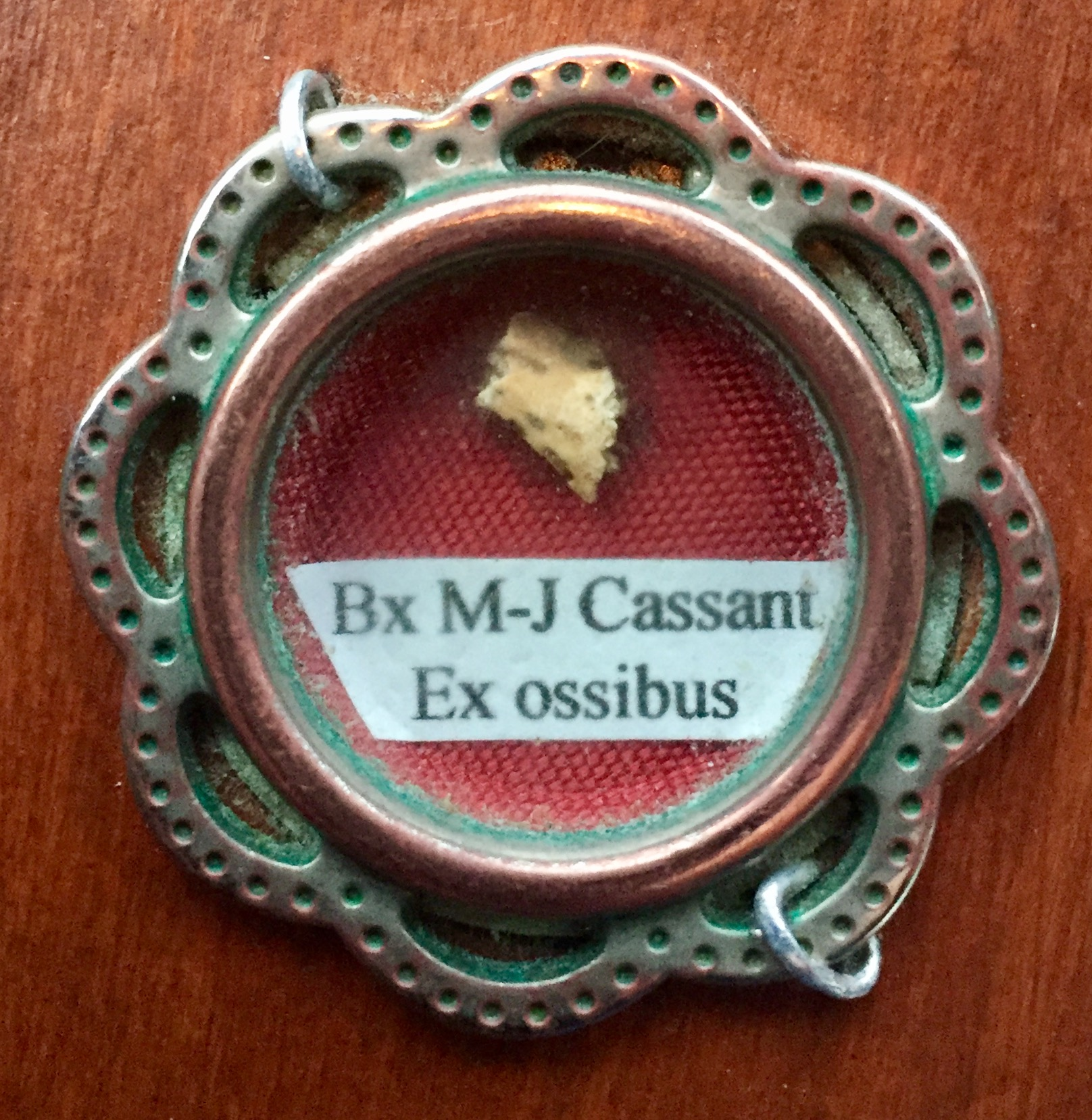
Blessed Marie Joseph Cassant first class bone relic

Pierre-Joseph Cassant, OCSO (6 March 1878 – 17 June 1903) was a French Catholic priest and professed member of the Trappists. During his novitiate he received the religious name of Marie-Joseph and was known for his strong determination to his studies to fulfil his lifelong wish of being ordained to the priesthood.

Cassant suffered from extreme tuberculosis around the time of his ordination and died not long after he was made a priest. Pope John Paul II celebrated his beatification on 3 October 2004.

== Life ==
Pierre-Joseph Cassant was born on 6 March 1878 in France to parents who were orchard-keepers as the second child born to them; his older brother was Emile (b. 1869) who was nine at the time of Cassant's birth.

He was a lodger at a boarding school that the De La Salle Brothers ran and it was here that his abilities in memorizing things were quite diminished and led to increasing learning difficulties. Despite these failings he was seen as a quiet and caring child.

It was at the age of 14 that he realized that he wanted to become a priest but learning difficulties prevented him from entering the seminary, so went to the parish priest Father Filhol for advice; he suggested he seek out the Trappists. Cassant entered a Cistercian convent in Sainte-Marie du Désert on 5 December 1894 where he was placed under the charge of Father André Mallet who said to him: "only trust and I will help you to love Jesus". During his novitiate he received the name of "Marie-Joseph" and he often spent time meditating upon Christ in his Passion and on the Cross, and he depended on Him for strength during his studies. To further advance his chances of studying for the priesthood, he underwent further studies of the French language and began to learn Latin. It was around this time that he formed his personal motto, "all for Jesus, all through Mary". He made his final vows on the Feast of the Ascension on 24 May 1900. From this point onwards he focused on becoming a priest and he viewed Holy Orders in relation to the Eucharist as being a critical facet of the duties of a priest.

Around this time, at the age of 21, he was summoned for mandatory military service and was discharged for reasons of health in March 1900.

He commenced his theological studies for the priesthood and suffered difficulties in doing so due to the same issue that plagued him when he was in school. The monk assigned to teach him humiliated and ridiculed him in public and said: "You are totally limited! It is useless for you to study. You will not learn any more. To ordain you would be a dishonor to the priesthood", yet Mallet assisted him with the course. Among his fellow seminarians he became well regarded, and some said of him: "He was always happy. It's what made the beauty of his face". Despite difficulties he was ordained as a priest on 12 October 1902. Immediately after this on 13 October, he was granted seven weeks of rest due to the advancement of tuberculosis he suffered. Despite his time of rest, his lungs were damaged beyond the point of repair and it made his breathing ever more difficult, and his health continued to worsen when he returned to the monastery on 2 December 1902. In his illness it was Mallet who became his close aid and support. Cassant said "when I can no longer say Mass, Jesus can take me from this world", in relation to his rapidly declining health.

Cassant became part of the Association of Victim Souls dedicated to the oblation of the Sacred Heart of Jesus Christ and signed an Act of Oblation to emulate the tenets of the organization. Cassant followed in the footsteps of those who were part of the congregation such as Charles de Foucauld, Alfredo Ildefonso Schuster, and Giuseppe Melchiorre Sarto, the future Pope Pius X.

Cassant celebrated his final Mass on 31 May 1903 and received the last rites on the following 1 June.

He died of tuberculosis in the dawn of 17 June 1903 after receiving Communion during a private Mass that Mallet celebrated for him; his final words were: "Jesus, Mary, Joseph, assist me in my last agony". Since his death there have been more than 2200 people from 30 countries that have reported miracles attributed to his intercession.

== Beatification ==
The beatification process opened in Toulouse in 1935. Cassant's spiritual writings were approved by theologians on 22 November 1939, and his cause was formally opened 19 February 1956 under Pope Pius XII, granting him the title Servant of God. Following this there was one final process to continue the work of the first process. Once that was completed the postulation compiled the Positio for the Congregation for the Causes of Saints in Rome to evaluate.

Pope John Paul II proclaimed him to be Venerable on 9 June 1984 on the account of his model Christian life of heroic virtue and beatified him on 3 October 2004 after the approval of a miracle: the healing of a nine year old from cerebrospinal meningitis who was healed a day after praying to Cassant.

The current postulator of the cause is Sister Augusta Tescari.
