= Luigi Talamoni =

Italian Roman Catholic priest and Blessed

Blessed Luigi Talamoni
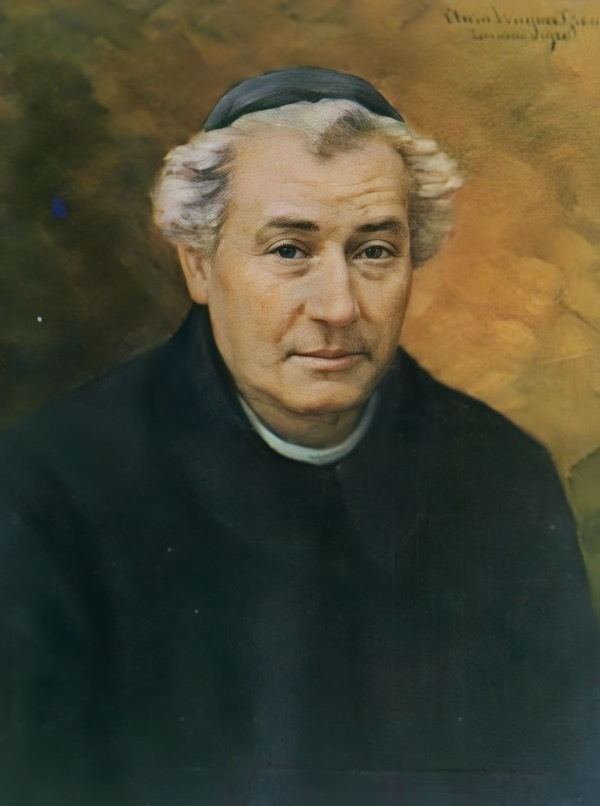
- Born: 3 October 1848; Monza, Kingdom of Italy
- Died: 31 January 1926 (aged 77); Milan, Kingdom of Italy
- Venerated in: Roman Catholic Church
- Beatified: 21 March 2004, Saint Peter's Square, Vatican City by Pope John Paul II
- Feast: 20 May (Martyrology), 3 October (Diocese of Milan)

Luigi Talamoni (3 October 1848 – 31 January 1926) was an Italian Roman Catholic priest and the founder of the Merciful Sisters of Saint Gerard. Talamoni also held civic office for a brief period though later resigned due to the rise of Fascism in the area and dedicated his career to proper care for the poor and to the maintenance of civic infrastructure. His beatification was celebrated in 2004.

== Life ==
Luigi Talamoni was born in Monza on 3 October 1848 as the second of six children to Giuseppe Talamoni and Maria Angelica Sala; he was baptized mere hours after his birth. His father worked as a hatmaker. Talamoni attended frequent Mass with his father and served at the altar which prompted him to dream of becoming a priest.

He completed his initial education in the "Oratorio di Barnabita Carrobiolo" in Monza that welcomed him later in the "seminar of the poor" due to his modest economic condition; the Barnabite priest Luigi Villoresi encouraged and supported him. In 1865 he graduated and commenced his studies for the priesthood in Milan where he underwent theological and philosophical studies in addition to literature – the latter two he took up after completing the former.

Talamoni received his ordination as a priest on 4 March 1871 from Archbishop Luigi Nazari di Calabiana (he celebrated his first Mass at Monza) and was soon sent to teach at the "Collegio San Carlo" in Milan where he had as a student (1874–75) Achille Ratti – the future Pope Pius XI. In 1875, he was called to Monza as a teacher of the high school there and also worked in pastoral care with a particular emphasis on preaching and working in the confessional.

The growing success of socialism led him to the political field: he agreed to be included in the civil lists of the "Catholic Committee of Monza" and in 1893 was elected to the Monza council. His political commitment was directed to the needs of schools and kindergartens as well as to improve the status of public roads and lighting and to the defense of moral values. Talamoni also remained committed to the establishment of houses for the poor and the protection of small businesses as well as the distribution of medicines for the poor and the improvement of the prison environment. The social work efforts also earned him the esteem of his political opponents. Despite his re-election in 1923 the climate of violence that the wave of fascism initiated forced his resignation from the council. His first term in office was from 1896 until 1916 and then ran again from 1923 until his resignation in 1926.

Talamoni was encouraged with and helped to direct the relief organization that Maria Biffi Levati (1835–1905) started and with her assistance founded the Merciful Sisters of Saint Gerard on 25 March 1891. His order received diocesan approval from Cardinal Andrea Carlo Ferrari on 18 March 1902.

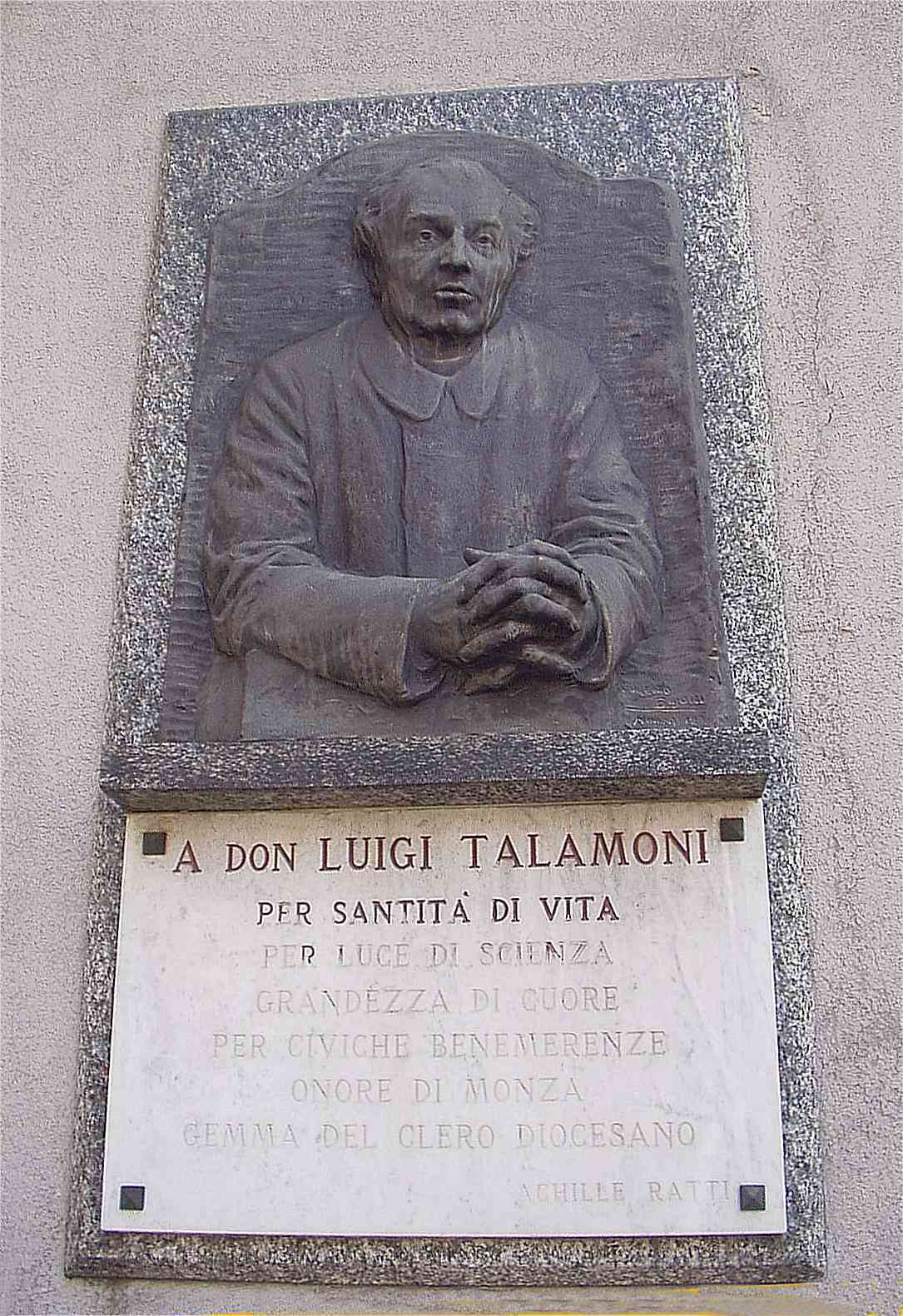
Plaque in Monza

Talamoni died in Milan – in the clinic of the Sisters of Maria Bambina – in 1926. His remains were exhumed on 20 May 1966 and relocated to the motherhouse of the order while his order later received the papal decree of praise from Pope Pius XII on 15 February 1942 and later his full papal approval on 10 May 1948. As of 2005 there were 90 religious in 15 houses in various Italian cities and has been active in Switzerland and in Togo since 2008.

== Beatification ==
The fame for his personal holiness reached far and wide across both Milan and Monza which prompted the Cardinal Archbishop of Milan Alfredo Ildefonso Schuster to commence the investigations for potential canonization. Cardinal Giovanni Battista Montini – the future Pope Paul VI – inaugurated the informative process in June 1957 and later closed it in December 1958. His spiritual writings received the approval of the theologians called in to assess them on two occasions on 29 March 1963 and again on 9 October 1971. The informative process received the validation of the Congregation for the Causes of Saints on 13 January 1989 so that the cause could proceed; the postulation submitted the Positio to the C.C.S. in 1989.

Theologians assented to the cause's continuation on 14 January 1992 as did the cardinal and bishop members of the C.C.S. on 2 June 1992. On 11 July 1992 he was proclaimed to be Venerable after Pope John Paul II confirmed that Talamoni led a model Christian life of heroic virtue. The miracle needed for beatification was investigated in the place it originated in and was later validated on 15 June 2001 before a medical board approved it on 21 November 2002. Theologians also issued their assent on 28 February 2003 as did the C.C.S. on 1 April 2003 before John Paul II granted final approval to it on 12 April 2003 and thus confirmed Talamoni would be beatified. On 21 March 2004 – in Saint Peter's Square – John Paul II beatified him. His remains were moved on this occasion from the church his remains were housed in to a new location.

On 3 October 2009 a solemn celebration in the Duomo of Monza that Cardinal Dionigi Tettamanzi presided over with the archpriest Silvano Provasi saw the announcement of the positive pronouncement of the Congregation for Divine Worship and the Discipline of the Sacraments on Talamoni being made the patron of the Province of Monza and Brianza.

The second miracle – and the one required for sanctification – was investigated in the location that it originated in and received validation from the C.C.S. on 30 October 2009.
