= Gaetana Tolomeo =

Blessed Gaetana Tolomeo
- Born: 10 April 1936; Catanzaro, Kingdom of Italy
- Died: 24 January 1997 (aged 60); Catanzaro, Italy
- Venerated in: Roman Catholic Church
- Beatified: 3 October 2021, Basilica di Maria Santissima Immacolata, Catanzaro, Italy by Cardinal Marcello Semeraro
- Feast: 19 April

Gaetana Tolomeo (10 April 1936 – 24 January 1997), also known as "Nuccia", was an Italian Roman Catholic laywoman. who has been beatified in 2019.

Tolomeo went through her entire life either confined to her bed or in a chair due to a progressive paralysis that rendered her disabled (she had suffered from this since her childhood. Throughout her life she gained a reputation for her piousness. She sought to spread the messages of the Gospel to others while a guest on a local radio station from 1994 until her death. Her time on the radio station marked her interest in reaching out for the conversion of sinners with an emphasis on reaching out to prostitutes or families in need.

== Life ==
Gaetana Tolomeo - known also as Nuccia - was born in Catanzaro - on 10 April 1936 (on Good Friday) to Salvatore Tolomeo and Carmela Palermo (who both married on 29 November 1933). Her birth was not registered until 19 April which on the official documents was considered her date of birth. Teodoro Diaco baptized her on 12 July 1936 in the Chiesa della Madonna del Rosario. Her maternal aunt was Elvira Palermo. Her brother Giuliano was born on 30 October 1940, but died around 1944.

In her childhood she suffered from a progressive and deforming paralysis that stunted her growth and left her disabled. Her parents sought out treatment for her and so sent her to an aunt in Cuneo where she could be treated. The doctors in Cuneo were unable to help alleviate her condition and so Tomelo returned to her hometown. Her condition progressed as she grew older which left her confined either to her bed or to a chair. But despite her condition she saw this as God using her suffering to reach the hearts of others in an effort to convert them from their sins. This was something that Tolomeo was adamant about for her entire life and which was also manifested in some of her writings. But Tolomeo also saw her condition as a participation in the Passion of Christ and also alluded to this in her spiritual writings. Tolomeo also for a time was a member of Catholic Action.

Those who came to visit her all noticed the fact that at all times she held clasped in her hands a rosary and Tolomeo herself was a frequent attendee for Eucharistic adoration. People from her town and surrounding areas knew of her and came to her seeking advice which also included priests and small families. In 1994 she began to collaborate with the local radio station "Radio Maria" in order to spread the message of the gospel to the suffering (with whom she identified) but also to drug addicts and prostitutes while also extending her outreach to families in need facing difficulties. Tolomeo often made appearances on the Il Fratello program in which the host Federico Quaglini would interview her and discuss spiritual matters with her. Tolomeo also had a strong devotion to Pio of Pietrelcina.

Tolomeo suffered a pulmonary edema and was admitted to hospital where she received a blood transfusion. Her health continued to decline until her death on 24 January 1997; her death was announced on Radio Maria the following morning. Her cousin Ida Chiefari wrote the first official biographical account of Tomelo's life.

== Veneration ==
Tomelo's remains were exhumed and transferred in a white casket to the Chiesa del Monte dei Morti e della Misericordia in Catanzaro. The relics were relocated on 1 November 2010 following a Mass that the Archbishop of Catanzaro-Squillace Antonio Ciliberti presided over; this came after her remains were exhumed on 17 September (in the presence of Ciliberti and the Tolomeo's cause's vice-postulator Pasquale Pitari) for inspection. The local council approved of the exhumation on 15 June 2010 while the Congregation for the Causes of Saints issued their approval on 21 June while issuing a set of instructions for performing it.

Her beatification process was opened just over a decade following her death and she became titled as a Servant of God; it was a decade following that in which Pope Francis titled her as venerable upon confirming her life of heroic virtue. Pope Francis beatified her in Catanzaro on 3 October 2021, after the confirmation of a miracle attributed to Tomelo's intercession. The postulator for this cause is the Capuchin Carlo Calloni.
