= Crescencia Valls Espí =

Blessed Crescencia Valls Espí Martyr
- Born: 9 June 1863; Onteniente, Spain
- Died: 26 September 1936 (aged 73); Canals, Spain
- Major shrine: Asunción de Nuestra Señora de Onteniente

Crescencia Valls Espí (Onteniente, 9 June 1863 – Canals, 26 September 1936) was a Spanish Catholic embroiderer who suffered martyrdom during the Spanish Civil War. She was beatified by Pope John Paul II on 11 March 2001.

== Life ==
Crescencia was born in Onteniente, Spain to Joaquín Valls and Francisca Espí and baptized on 10 June 1863 in the parish church of Santa Maria. She received a basic education at the school of the Daughters of Charity of San Vicente de Paúl in Onteniente. A devout Catholic, she became an embroiderer, working at home to help support her family. She belonged to several charitable Catholic associations: Women of Saint Vincent de Paul, the Apostleship of Prayer and the Third Order of Our Lady of Carmel.

Soon Crescencia was officially labeled a "fervent Catholic" by the mayor of Onteniente, who denounced her to the governor of Valencia. On 26 September 1936, citing her collaborations with religious organizations and advocacy of Catholicism, militiamen broke into her house shortly before noon and arrested her together with her three sisters Concepción, Carmen and Patrocinio. They were taken to the port of Canals and finally, after about 12 hours of imprisonment, all four sisters were murdered, shot in the neck.

At first, Crescentia's body was deposited with other martyrs in a common grave in the Canals cemetery, but her remains were later exhumed and the relics were interred at her hometown church, the Asunción de Nuestra Señora de Onteniente.

== Beatification process ==
Officials at the Archdiocese of Valencia promoted Crescencia's beatification because of her dedication to faith. She was beatified by Pope John Paul II on 11 March 2001 as one of 232 Spanish martyrs.

In its documents to support the beatification process, the Archdiocese of Valencia called the Servant of God Crescencia Valls Espí a "social apostle" and praised her charitable work.

A social apostle, she exercised charity visiting the sick. She asked wealthy people for financial aid in order to help the needs of the poor. Likewise, immensely charitable, she was moved and suffered by people's pains. For families who had a deceased person, she helped them pay burial expenses and consoled them in their grief.

With the start of the Spanish Civil War in 1936, numerous massacres took place and, according to documents from the Archdiocese of Valencia, Crescencia knew what to expect: "The Servant of God, in the days before the revolution, was aware of the situation she was about to face: religious persecution and probable martyrdom."
