= Mercè Prat i Prat =

Blessed Mercè Prat i Prat STJ
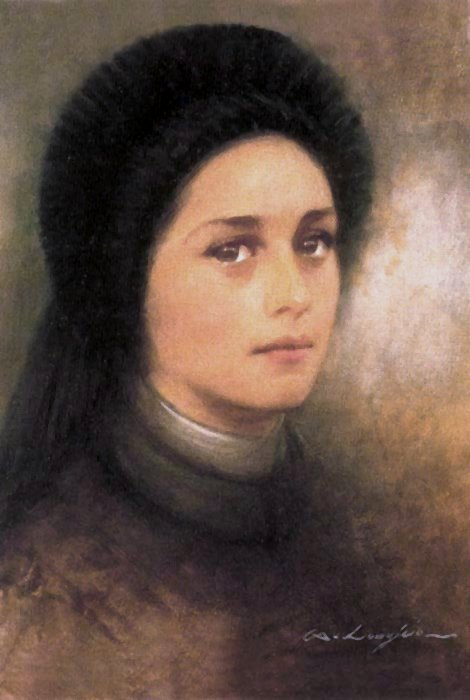

Virgin, martyr
- Born: 6 March 1880; Barcelona
- Died: 24 July 1936 (aged 56); Barcelona
- Venerated in: Roman Catholic Church
- Beatified: 29 April 1990, Saint Peter's Square by Pope John Paul II
- Feast: 24 July

Mercè Prat i Prat, STJ (6 March 1880 - 24 July 1936) was a Spanish Catholic nun who was a member of the Societatis Sanctae Teresiae a Iesu ("Society of St. Teresa of Jesus"). She assumed the religious name of Maria Mercè of the Sacred Heart. She was killed during the Spanish Civil War on the charge of being a religious sister. Pope John Paul II beatified her on 29 April 1990 in Saint Peter's Square.

== Life ==
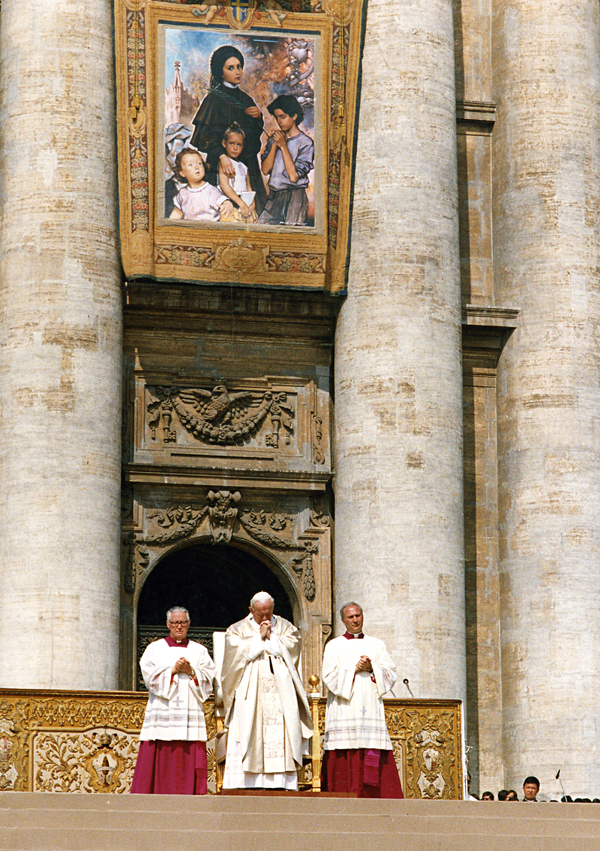
John Paul II presides over Prat's beatification.

Mercè Prat i Prat was born on 6 March 1880 in Barcelona as the eldest of four children to Juan Prat i Serra and Teresa Prat i Bordoy. She was baptized on 7 March and received her First Communion on 30 June 1890. She attended Mass on a frequent basis as a child and excelled in painting as well as needlework.

Prat had to fend for herself and her siblings after the death of her father in 1895 and the death of her mother not long after in 1896.

Prat travelled to Tortosa in 1904 and entered the Teresian Sisters while commencing her novitiate on 27 August. Prat was vested in the habit on 1 March 1905 and made her profession on 10 March 1907. She worked in the field of education in Barcelona until 1909 when she was invited to Madrid where she made her final vows on 10 March 1910; she was in Tortosa in 1915 and was later assigned to work at the motherhouse of the congregation in 1920 in Barcelona. On 19 July 1936 the congregation was forced to abandon both their house and school due to suppression from the anti-Catholic government forces.

She was later arrested within the week alongside a companion and was sentenced to death on the charge of being a nun. She was both interrogated and threatened with being shot on 23 July. That evening he and her companion were shot in the evening before a firing squad on the road to Rabasda; Prat repeated between cries of pain: "Jesus, Joseph, Mary" while she also recited the Apostles' Creed. Her last words were part of the Our Father: "Forgive us ... as we forgive ..." - militiamen heard her cries of pain and shot her dead at dawn at 4:00 a.m. on 24 July. She was buried in Barcelona.

Gioacchina Miguel, another sister arrested and shot alongside Prat, lived through the ordeal and became a main witness for the beatification process of Prat.

== Beatification ==
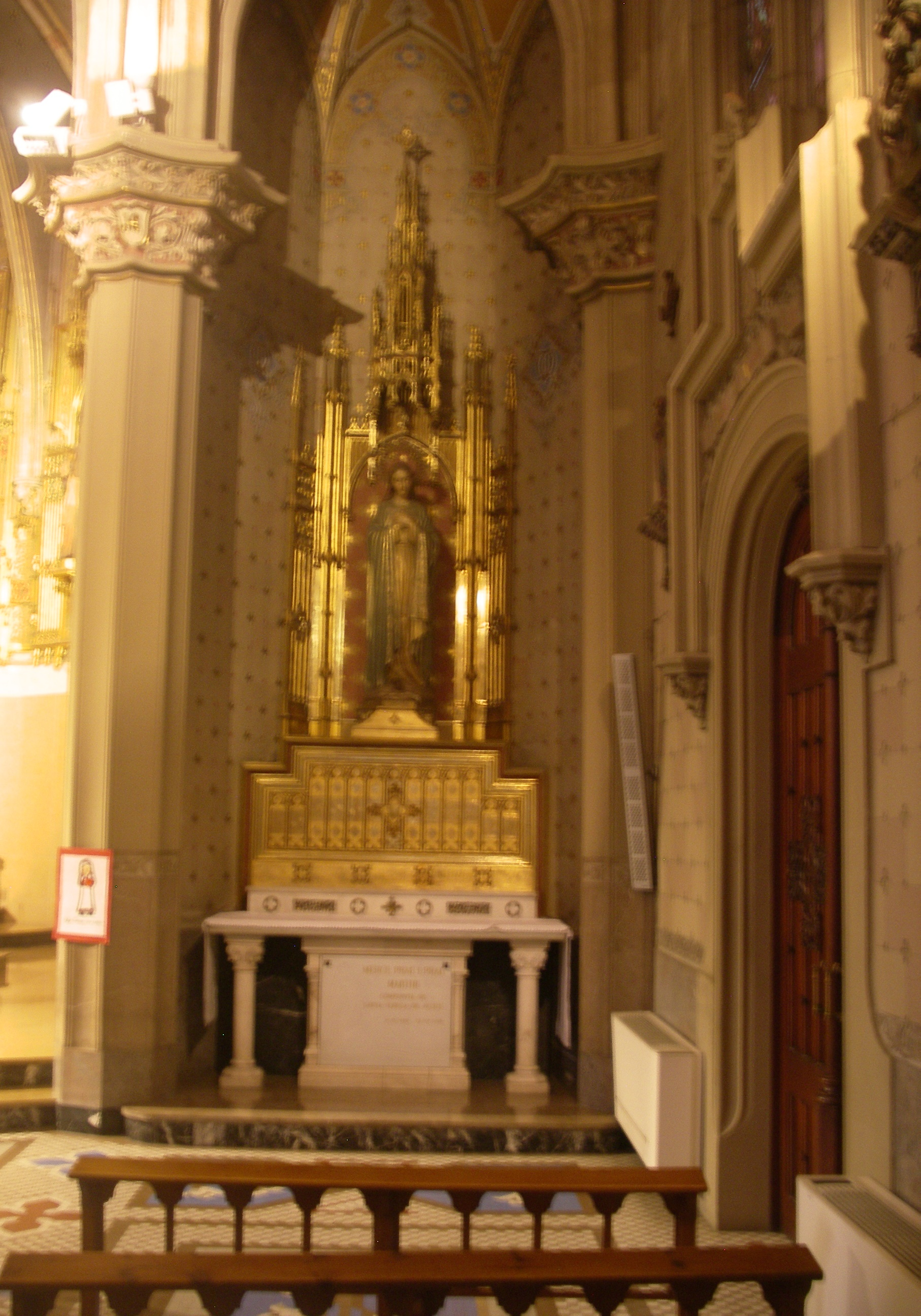
Tomb.

The beatification process commenced in 1969 - under Pope Paul VI - in an informative process that concluded in 1970 and accorded her the title of Servant of God as the first stage in the process; one of the main witnesses was the nun Gioacchina Miguel. The Congregation for the Causes of Saints validated the process in Rome on 21 June 1985 and assumed charge of the Positio in 1987 for further investigation.

Her beatification received the approval of Pope John Paul II on 21 December 1989 after he determined that Prat had indeed died "in odium fidei" ('through hatred of the faith' by her killers) and beatified Prat in Saint Peter's Square on 29 April 1990.
