= Mykola Konrad =

Ukrainian Catholic priest and martyr (1876–1941)

Blessed Mykola Konrad OSBM
- Born: May 16, 1876; Strusów, Austrian Galicia, Austria-Hungary (now Strusiv, Ukraine)
- Died: July 26, 1941 (aged 65) near Stradch, Ukrainian SSR, Soviet Union

Mykola Konrad (Ukrainian: Микола Конрад; 16 May 1876 – 26 June 1941) was a Ukrainian Greek Catholic priest and martyr.

== Biography ==
Konrad was born on 16 May 1876 in the village of Strusów, then a part of the Austro-Hungarian Empire (modern-day Strusiv, Ukraine). He studied philosophy and theology in Rome, where he defended his dissertation and received his doctorate. He was ordained a priest in 1899. He taught for a time in high schools in Berezhany and Terebovlya. In 1929, he founded Obnova (Ukrainian: Обнова, lit. 'renewal'), the first communion of Ukrainian Catholic students, and in 1930 he was asked by Metropolitan Andriy Sheptytsky to teach at the Lviv Theological Academy. He was then appointed parish priest in the village of Stradch.

On 26 June 1941 he was murdered along with Volodymyr Pryjma, in a forest near Stradch as they were returning from the house of a sick woman who had requested the sacrament of reconciliation.

He was beatified by Pope John Paul II on 27 June 2001.

== Influence ==
In an interview, Mykola Markevych said, "Doctor Konrad, a professor at the Academy, my catechist... O, he was a distinguished person. An ideal man. He was very involved with youth; he had a heart for youth- and for his people. He wanted us to be patriots, good and aware students. That was Father Konrad."
