= Volodymyr Pryjma =

Ukrainian Catholic martyr (1906–1941)

Blessed Volodymyr Pryjma
- Born: 17 July 1906; Stradcz, Austrian Galicia, Austria-Hungary (now Stradch, Ukraine)
- Died: 26 June 1941 (aged 34) near Stradch, Ukrainian SSR, Soviet Union
- Cause of death: torture

Volodymyr Pryjma (Ukrainian: Володимир Прийма; 17 July 1906 – 26 June 1941) was a Ukrainian Greek Catholic choir director and martyr.

== Biography ==
Pryjma was born on 17 July 1906 in the village of Stradch, Yavoriv District. He graduated from a school for cantors, which was at that time under the care of Metropolitan Andrey Sheptytsky. He was made the cantor and choir director in the local village church in Stradch. Pryjma was married with two young children.

On 26 June 1941, four days after the start of the German-Soviet War, agents of the Soviet Union's NKVD tortured and killed him, along with Mykola Konrad, in a forest near Stradch as they were returning from the house of a sick woman who had requested the sacrament of reconciliation. His body had not been found until a week after the murder. He had been stabbed multiple times in the chest with a bayonet.

He was beatified by Pope John Paul II on 27 June 2001.

On 2 November 2019, Pryjma's relics were placed in the Holy Eucharist Ukrainian Catholic Cathedral in New Westminster, Canada.

Yurii Sakavronskyi recounted the martyrdom in an interview:

Fr Konrad went with the holy sacraments to fulfill his sacred obligation, hearing a woman's confession in the neighboring village. He felt he had to go, though he was stopped. I know that they stopped him and said; 'Father, don't go. Look what's happening;the war has started, anything could happen.' He said that this was his sacred duty and that he had to go. He got dressed and left together with Volodymyr Pryjma, the cantor. They didn't come back. After a week, they were found there, murdered. People thought something was wrong. So they went to look for them and found them there. It was awful. The cantor's wife had two children. One was three, the other was four. Momma told how when they were found everyone was overcome by what they saw. The cantor was especially cut up, his chest stabbed with a bayonet many times.
