= Nicola da Gesturi =

Blessed Nicola da Gesturi O.F.M. Cap.
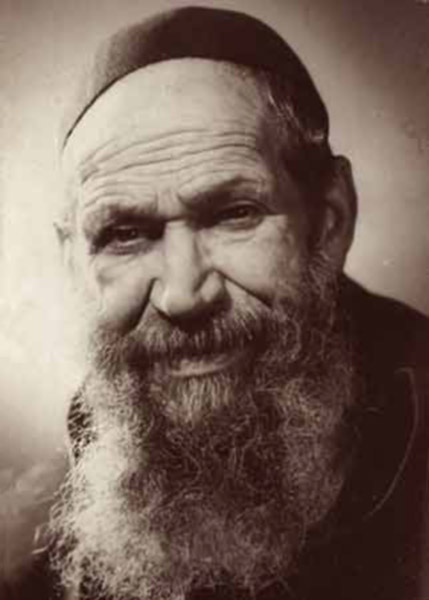

Religious
- Born: 4 August 1882; Gesturi, Cagliari, Kingdom of Italy
- Died: 8 June 1958 (aged 75); Cagliari, Italy
- Venerated in: Roman Catholic Church
- Beatified: 3 October 1999, Saint Peter's Square, Vatican City by Pope John Paul II
- Feast: 8 June
- Attributes: Capuchin habit
- Patronage: Cagliari; Sardinia

Nicola da Gesturi (4 August 1882 – 8 June 1958), born Giovanni Angelo Salvatore Medda, was an Italian Roman Catholic and a professed member of the Order of Friars Minor Capuchin. Throughout his life he encouraged and led charitable works in Sardinia.

Pope John Paul II recognized a miracle attributed to him and beatified him on 3 October 1999. A second miracle needed for his canonization is now under investigation.

== Life ==
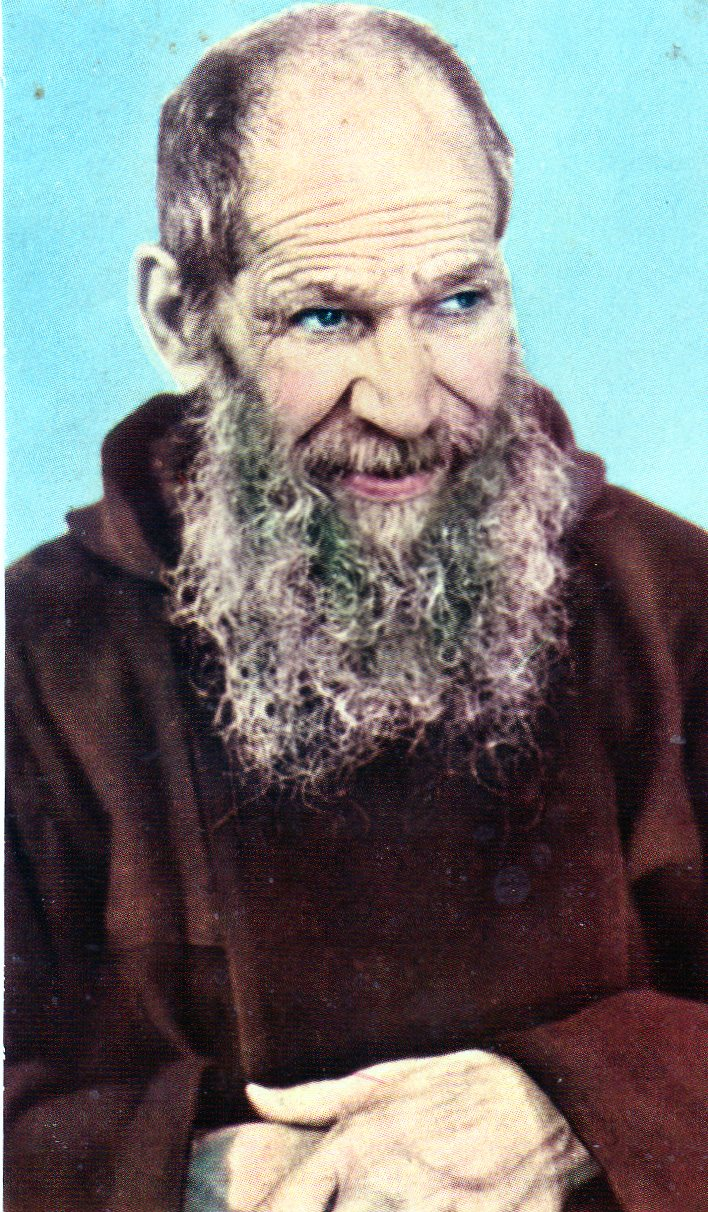
The beatified friar.

Giovanni Angelo Salvatore Medda was born on 4 August 1882 in Gesturi as the sixth of seven children to Giovanni Medda and Priama Cogoni Zedda. His siblings were Rita, Maria Antonia, Peppino, Giovanni and Salvatore. He received the sacrament of Confirmation in 1886.

He was five when his father died on 10 June 1887 and thirteen when his mother died on 6 June 1895. As a result of this Medda was put in the care of his father's sister, Rita, who regarded and used him as her servant. He spent his time between work in the fields and the cattle guard. His aunt - and "master" - died sometime after this. He received his First Communion on 18 December 1896. Medda practiced self-mortification as a stimulus to respond to his vocation in becoming a professed religious.

In March 1911 he entered a Capuchin institution in Cagliari and made his novitiate and first solemn profession. He soon took the habit and assumed the name of "Nicola". He fluctuated between monasteries in Sanluri to Sassari as well as in Oristano. He was in charge of the kitchens. He was removed from this position in 1924. He was assigned to the 'quest'. The 'quest' was a practice among the Franciscans whereby the friars would beg for support among the local people. It often became a means to meet and speak with people about the Catholic Faith. Nicola devoted himself to charitable acts in the name of Francis of Assisi. Despite this he still received insults from those who saw him as a mere beggar.

He became popular as time went on and people approached him for advice and to talk with him. He was invited to visit hospitals and provide comfort to the sick. Sudden healings started and so his fame increased. In World War II he cared for the displaced and those separated from their families. He ensured each person was fed and looked after.

On 1 June 1958 he was exhausted and approached the Father Superior. He asked to be relieved from his duties and the superior allowed this. He was admitted to the clinic and required an operation on 2 June due to his health which took a sharp decline at this point. He died in peace on 8 June 1958 at 12:15 a.m.

== Beatification ==
The beatification process commenced under Pope Paul VI on 11 June 1977 which granted him the posthumous title of Servant of God. A local process in Cagliari was held to gather documents and testimonies. The process was ratified in 1986 and the Positio - documentation on his life of heroic virtue - was submitted to the Congregation for the Causes of Saints in Rome in 1990. Pope John Paul II conferred upon him the title of Venerable on 25 June 1996 after he recognized his heroic virtue.

The miracle required for his beatification was investigated and the process was ratified on 24 March 1995. John Paul II approved the miracle on 21 December 1998 and beatified on 3 October 1999.

The miracle that is required for his canonization was discovered and was investigated. It commenced in 2014 and concluded in 2015; it must be approved before he can be canonized. The documentation was sent to Rome in June 2015.
