= Euthymia Üffing =

German Roman Catholic

Blessed Maria Euthymia Üffing
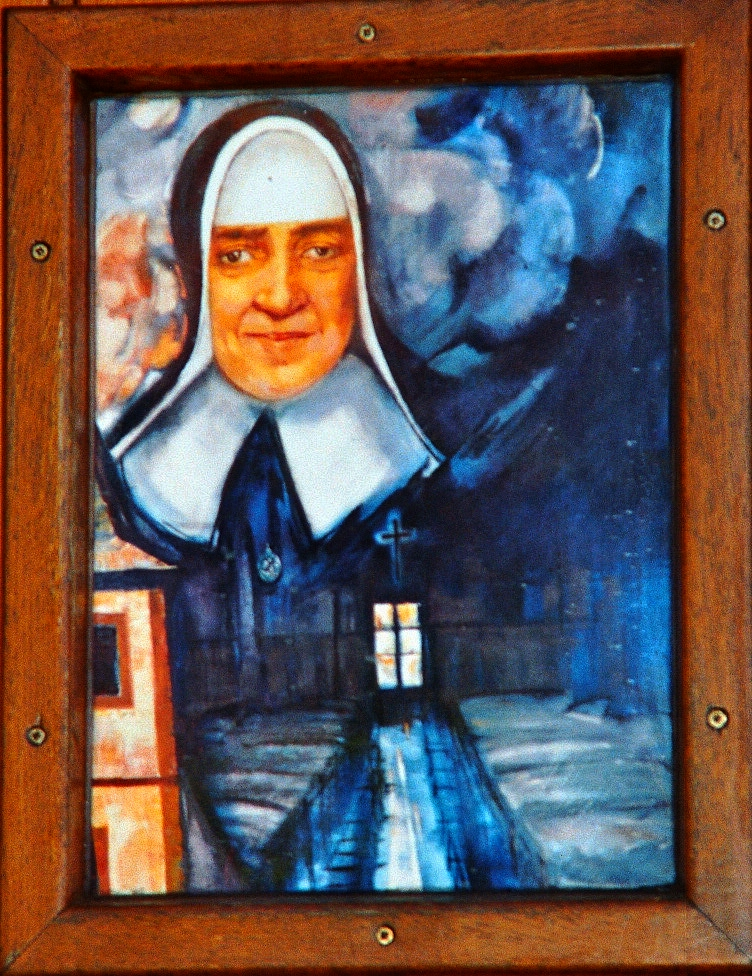
- Painting of Maria Euthymia Üffing
- Born: 8 April 1914; Halverde, North Rhine-Westphalia, German Empire
- Died: 9 September 1955 (aged 41); Münster, North Rhine-Westphalia, West Germany
- Venerated in: Roman Catholic Church
- Beatified: 7 October 2001, Saint Peter's Square, Vatican City by Pope John Paul II
- Feast: 9 September

Euthymia Üffing (born as Emma Üffing, 8 April 1914 – 9 September 1955) was a German religious sister of the Sisters of Charity of the Blessed Virgin and Our Lady of Sorrows. She was beatified on 7 October, 2001.

== Life ==
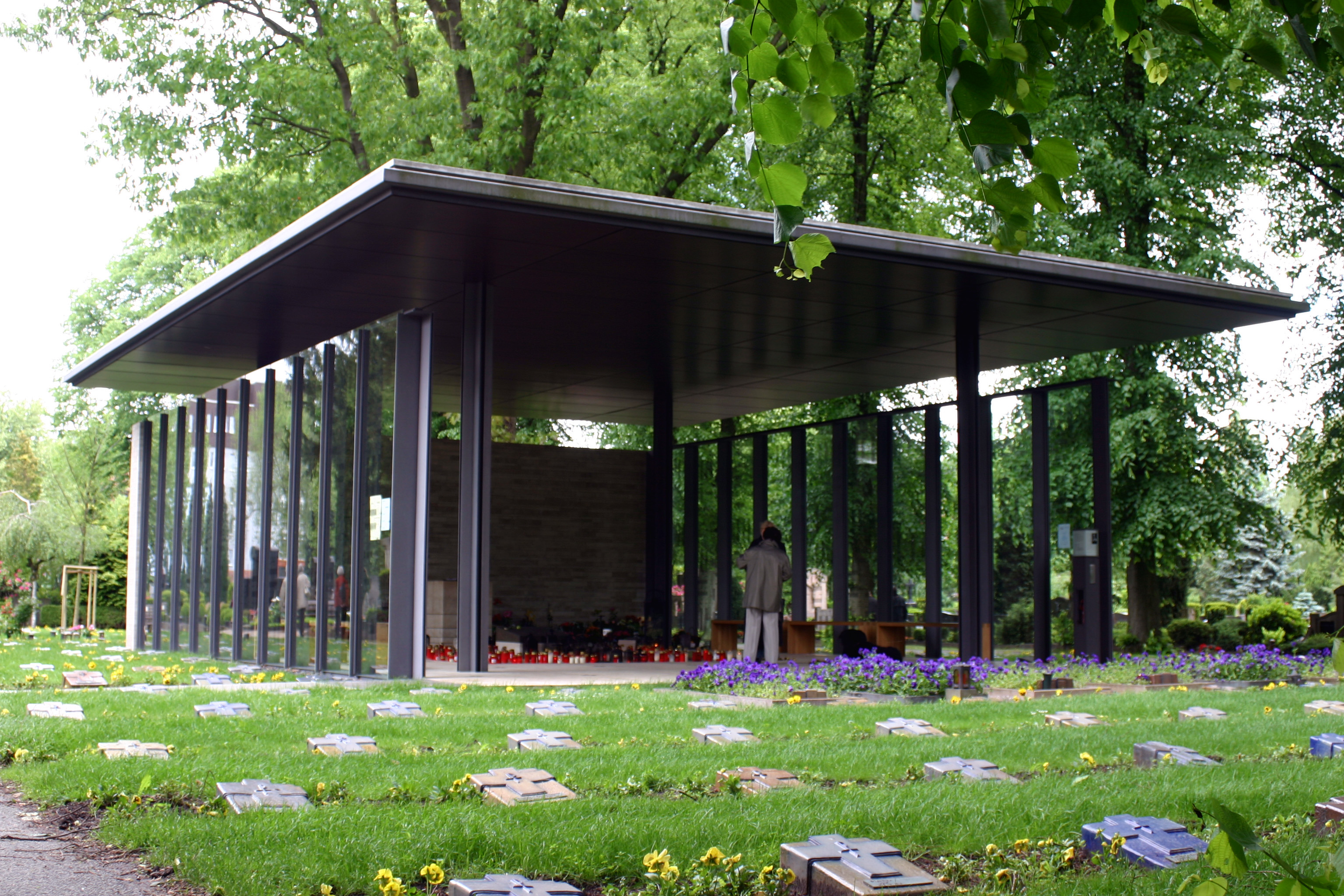
Chapel containing her tomb

Üffing was born to farmers, on whose small farm she worked until she was 17. Later she worked in the kitchen of the hospital of Saint Anne in Hopsten which was run by the Sisters of Charity of the Blessed Virgin and Our Lady of Sorrows. There she decided to enter the religious life as a postulant on 23 July. Üffing is said to have assumed her religious name Maria Euthymia, in honor of the mother superior Euthymia in Hopsten.

After she made her first vows. she sent a letter to her mother in which she said: "I found Him who my heart loves; I want to hold Him and never let him go".

Üffing was sent to various German hospitals and she also tended to ill people during World War II. She tended to foreigners who were admitted into these hospitals such as Russian and British people and was hailed as an "Angel of love" due to her affectionate care of the patients under her care.

In October 1936 she was assigned to work at Saint Vincent's Hospital in Dinslaken and she graduated from her nursing program with special distinctions on 3 September 1939 — not long after the start of World War II with the Invasion of Poland. Üffing worked as a nurse during the conflict and in 1943 was assigned to nurse prisoners of war and foreign workers who had infectious diseases and she tended to the likes of British and Ukrainian people though Polish and Russian foreigners would later flood in. The conclusion of the war in 1945 saw her assigned to the washrooms of the Dinslaken hospital and later on 14 January 1948 saw her sent to work in her order's motherhouse and the Saint Raphael Clinic in Münster. She was ill for a brief period of time after contracting a high fever on 24 March 1945 while working.

On 8 July 1955 she was diagnosed with bowel cancer after she experienced a sudden collapse while at work in the washhouse. At the end of August 1955 she suffered an extreme fever and was confined to her bed - she also requested for the Anointing of the Sick. Üffing died in the morning of 9 September 1955 from bowel cancer. Her relics were exhumed and investigated in 1985 and entombed again.

== Beatification ==
Before Üffings funeral a fellow sister went to her remains asking for her intercession in healing a hand she had burned in an ironing accident, of which she was later healed. Üffings beatification process was initiated under Pope Paul VI on 9 January 1976 and she was titled as a Servant of God before Pope John Paul II named her as venerable on 1 September 1988 and later beatified her on 7 October 2001.

The beatification process commenced under Pope Paul VI on 9 January 1976 after the Congregation for the Causes of Saints issued the official nihil obstat ("nothing against"). The cognitional process was then held in Münster and received validation from the Congregation on 14 December 1981. The submission of the official positio dossier to the Congrega†ion in 1986 allowed for a board of theologians to voice their approval to the cause's merits in their meeting of 12 January 1988 while the cardinal and bishop members of the Congregation themselves also granted their approval to the cause on 26 April 1988. This in turn allowed for Pope John Paul II to issue his final approval and name Üffing as venerable on 1 September 1988 after confirming that Üffing had lived a life of heroic virtue.

The miracle required for her beatification was investigated in the German diocese of her origin and after the process received the validation of the Congregation on 10 July 1992 which allowed for a special medical board to evaluate the documents presented to them and approve the cause on 4 March 1999. A board of theologians likewise approved the healing to be a legitimate miracle in their meeting of 22 October 1999 while the Congregation issued their own approval on 7 March 2000. John Paul II issued his final approval to the miracle on 1 July 2000 and beatified Üffing on 7 October 2001 in Saint Peter's Square. The postulator assigned to this cause is Andrea Ambrosi.
