= Vicente Vilar David =

Spanish engineer and martyr

Blessed Vicente Vilar David

Martyr
- Born: 28 June 1889; Manises, Valencia, Kingdom of Spain
- Died: 14 February 1937 (aged 47); Manises, Valencia, Second Spanish Republic
- Venerated in: Roman Catholic Church
- Beatified: 1 October 1995, Saint Peter's Square, Vatican City by Pope John Paul II
- Feast: 14 February

Vicente Vilar David (28 June 1889 - 14 February 1937) was a Spanish engineer from Spain at the time of the Spanish Civil War in the 1930s during a period of intense anti-clerical sentiment. As a worker he strove to adhere to the social doctrine of the Christian faith and spread such values in the workplace and among his colleagues. He was killed on the basis of aiding priests and religious escape the persecution by the Republicans during the Civil War.

David was beatified on 1 October 1995 after Pope John Paul II recognized that he had been killed in odium fidei ("in hatred of the faith").

== Life ==
Vicente Vilar David was born in Valencia in Spain on 28 June 1889 as the last of a total of eight children into a household infused with deep traditional Christian values; he had at least three older brothers. As a child he was noted for being cheerful and extroverted.

The Piarists oversaw his education as a child and as an adolescent studied engineering in Valencia for that was the career that David aspired for. He spread fundamental Christian morals among his fellow colleagues and was known for his deep commitment to charitable works in the name of the poor. He served as an industrial engineer in his own ceramics farm that he had inherited and oversaw with three of his brothers after the premature death of their parents. David also held several important municipal positions where he put the social teachings of the faith into full practice and was renowned for his deep commitment to fundamental values and traditional principles. Youth organizations were also a forum for his work as well as a range of parish activities.

At the age of 33 in 1922 married Isabel Rodes Reig (d. 1993).

He was against the anti-religious sentiment in the 1930s and he worked to help priests and nuns escape persecution and execution though took no steps to protect himself from the regime during the Spanish Civil War. Authorities soon arrested him in 1937 and as he was being taken his wife called out to him and said: "See you tomorrow". David replied: "Until tomorrow or in Heaven!" Minutes later loud shots were heard and David was killed. His workers closed their factory for a period of three days as a sign of mourning.

== Beatification ==
The beatification process commenced under Pope Paul VI in a diocesan process in Valencia that spanned from 4 September 1963 until 13 October 1967. The process - which granted him the posthumous title Servant of God - and allowed for the gathering of documents pertaining to David's life and witness testimonies about his death and his life; this included people such as his widowed wife. The Congregation for the Causes of Saints approved the process on 10 November 1990 and began their own investigation into the cause in the so-called "Roman Phase".

The Positio was compiled as a large dossier and was sent to Rome for their investigations; Pope John Paul II approved the findings and recognized that David was killed in hatred for his Christian faith in 1993 and allowed for his beatification to take place; no miracle was required for beatification since his virtues were not investigated in this process.

The beatification was celebrated on 1 October 1995.

The sole miracle needed for his sanctification was investigated and was validated on 25 November 2005.

The postulator of the cause is Silvia Mónica Correale.
