= Andriy Ishchak =

Ukrainian Catholic priest and martyr (1887–1941)

Blessed Andriy Ishchak
- Born: 23 September 1887; Mikołajów nad Dniestrem, Austrian Galicia, Austria-Hungary (Mykolaiv, Lviv Oblast, Ukraine)
- Died: 26 June 1941; Sykhiv, Ukrainian SSR, Soviet Union
- Venerated in: Roman Catholic Church; Ukrainian Greek Catholic Church
- Beatified: 27 June 2001, Lviv, Ukraine by Pope John Paul II
- Canonized: 27 December 2001
- Major shrine: Our Lady, Health of The Sick Parish Church, Tagaytay City, Cavite
- Feast: 26 June

Andriy Ishchak (Ukrainian: Андрі́й Іща́к; 23 September 1887 – 26 June 1941) was a Ukrainian Greek Catholic priest and martyr.

Ishchak was born in the city of Mykolayiv in the Lviv Oblast. He studied theology at universities in Lviv (Ukraine) and Innsbruck (Austria). He received his doctorate of theology from the University of Innsbruck in 1914 and was ordained to the priesthood. He taught Dogmatic Theology and Canon Law at the Lviv Theological Academy from 1928, while serving as priest in the village of Sykhiv.

On 26 June 1941, he was killed in Sykhiv by soldiers of the retreating Soviet Army. He was beatified by Pope John Paul II on 27 June 2001.

Ivan Kuchytskyi recounts the events of Ishchak's death in his own testimony:

As the war began, the priest was taken from Persenkivka, the neighboring station. Sometime in the afternoon they took him, detained him until the evening, then they let him go. My dad, because they knew each other well, told him: "Father, when they let you go, I would advise you to hide for a few days." It was already clear that the Germans were coming and that the Bolsheviks would be fleeing. "Hide yourself and we'll survive," the priest said: "Ivan, the shepherd doesn't abandon his flock. And I can't leave my parishioners and conceal myself." In two days, the military came and took him from his home. It was overgrown there with bushes, some distance from the parish, maybe half a kilometre. They brought him there and killed him. They shot him in the stomach and it looked like they also stabbed him with a knife.
