= Mittelbiberach =

- Municipality
- Coat of arms

- Location of Mittelbiberach within Biberach district
- Interactive map of Mittelbiberach
- Location within Germany Location within Baden-Württemberg
- Coordinates: 48°5′12″N 9°45′7″E
- Country: Germany
- State: Baden-Württemberg
- Admin. region: Tübingen
- District: Biberach

Government
  - Mayor (2018–26): Florian Hänle

Area
  - Total: 23.68 km^{2} (9.14 sq mi)
- Elevation: 594 m (1,949 ft)

Population (2025-12-31)
  - Total: 4,450
  - Density: 188/km^{2} (487/sq mi)
- Time zone: UTC+01:00 (CET)
  - Summer (DST): UTC+02:00 (CEST)
- Postal codes: 88441
- Dialling codes: 07351
- Vehicle registration: BC
- Website: www.mittelbiberach.de

Mittelbiberach (German pronunciation: [ˈmɪtl̩ˌbiːbəʁax]) is a village and a municipality in the district of Biberach.

Mittelbiberach is a village between Reute, Stafflangen and Biberach. The river Rotbach flows through the village. Reute, Unterreute, Oberdorf, Findenmösle, and Geradsweiler are parts of Mittelbiberach. In 2020, Mittelbiberach had a population of 4,351.

Mittelbiberach has a number of civic associations, including the "Bürgermilitärcorps Mittelbiberach", the Fanfarenzug MBC, and the Mittelbiberacher Bauerntheater. Sports including football, gymnastics, karate, table tennis, tennis, and volleyball are also available in the village.

The famous "Maria Geburt Festival", a local festival with many traditions, is visited by many people each year.

One of Mittelbiberach's most popular music groups is "Swing Tonic", with its distinctive smooth Latin, jazz and oldies sound.
