= Robledillo de la Vera =

Coordinates: 40°06′N 5°35′W

Robledillo de la Vera, Spain
- municipality
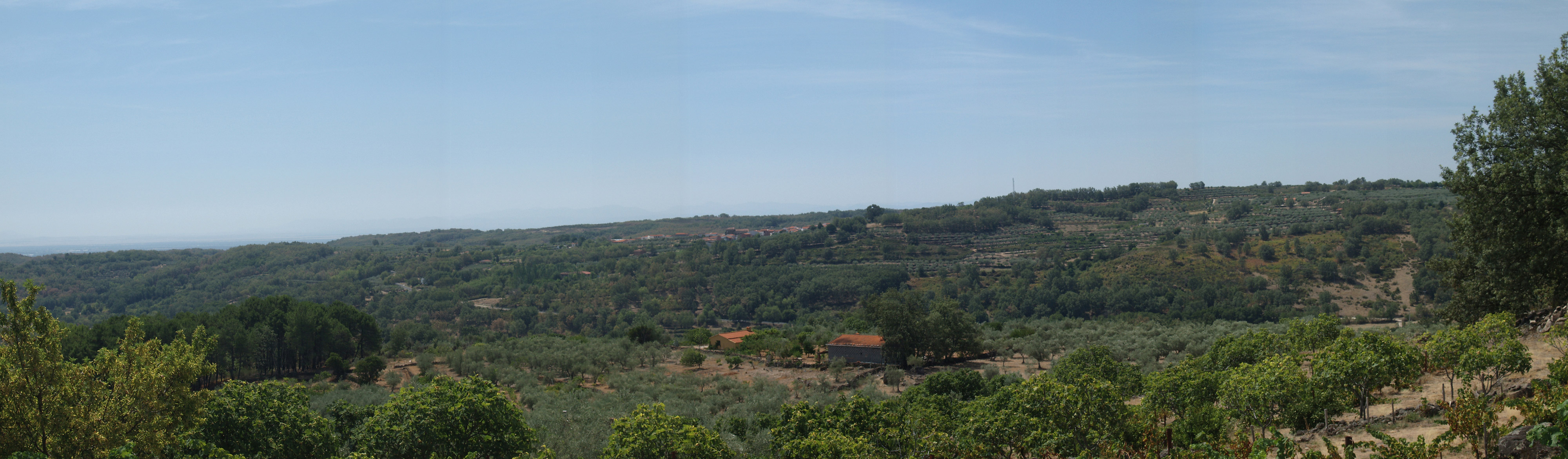
- Panoramic view of Robledillo de la Vera

- Flag Coat of arms
- Interactive map of Robledillo de la Vera, Spain
- Country: Spain
- Autonomous community: Extremadura
- Province: Cáceres
- Municipality: Robledillo de la Vera

Area
  - Total: 12 km^{2} (4.6 sq mi)
- Elevation: 445 m (1,460 ft)

Population (2025-01-01)
  - Total: 252
  - Density: 21/km^{2} (54/sq mi)
- Time zone: UTC+1 (CET)
  - Summer (DST): UTC+2 (CEST)

Robledillo de la Vera is a municipality located in the province of Cáceres, Extremadura, Spain. According to the 2006 census (INE), the municipality has a population of 318 inhabitants.

== See also ==
- List of municipalities in Cáceres
