= Cathedral of Veracruz =

Cathedral in Veracruz, Mexico

Coordinates: 19.19977°N 96.13828°W

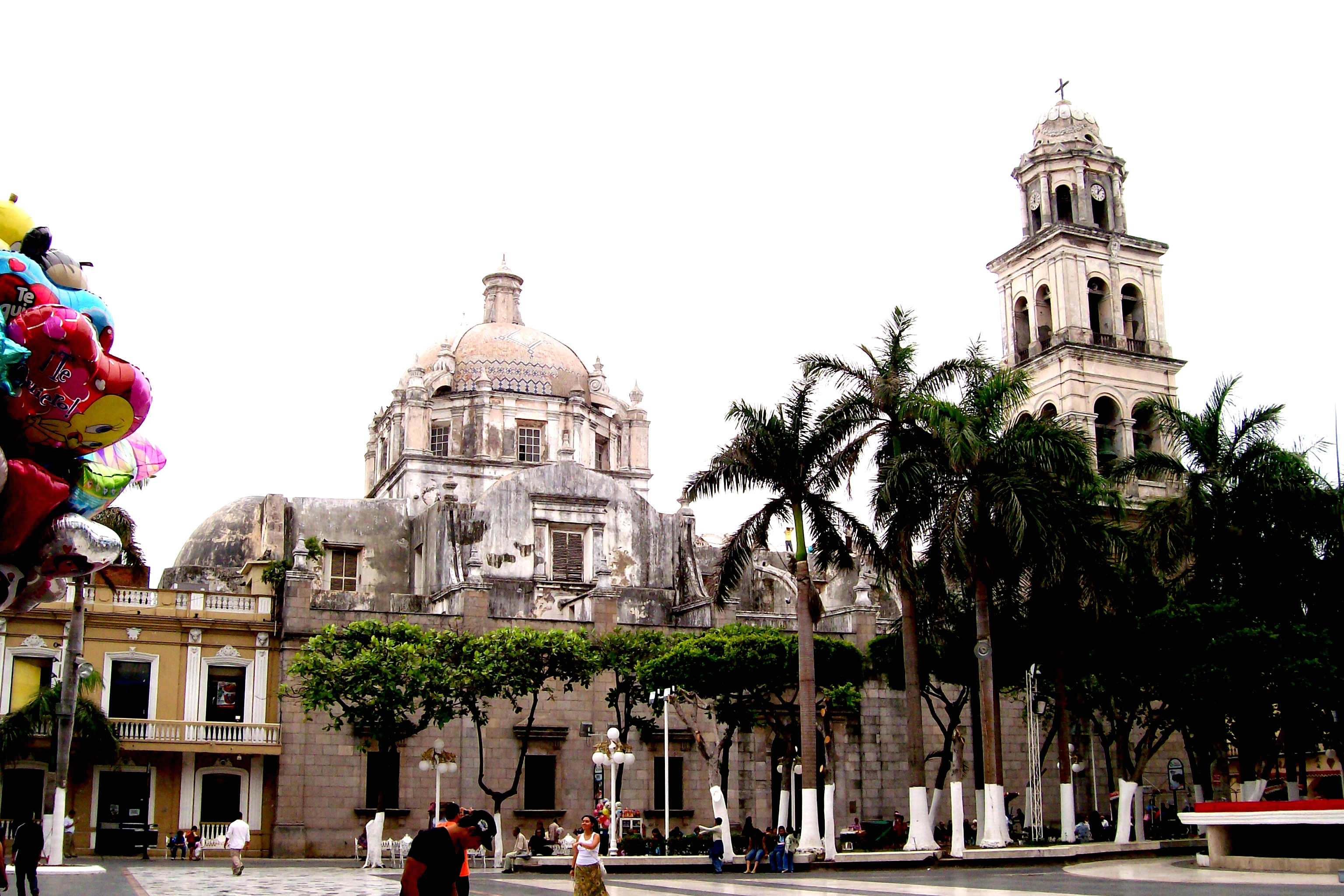
Facade of the cathedral

The Veracruz Cathedral, dedicated to Our Lady of the Assumption, is located in the historic center of the city of Veracruz, Mexico. It was consecrated as a cathedral in 1963.

Previously, there had been a parish church of modest proportions on the site, built in the early 17th century and completed in 1731. It had a single tower on the right-hand side.

== Building ==
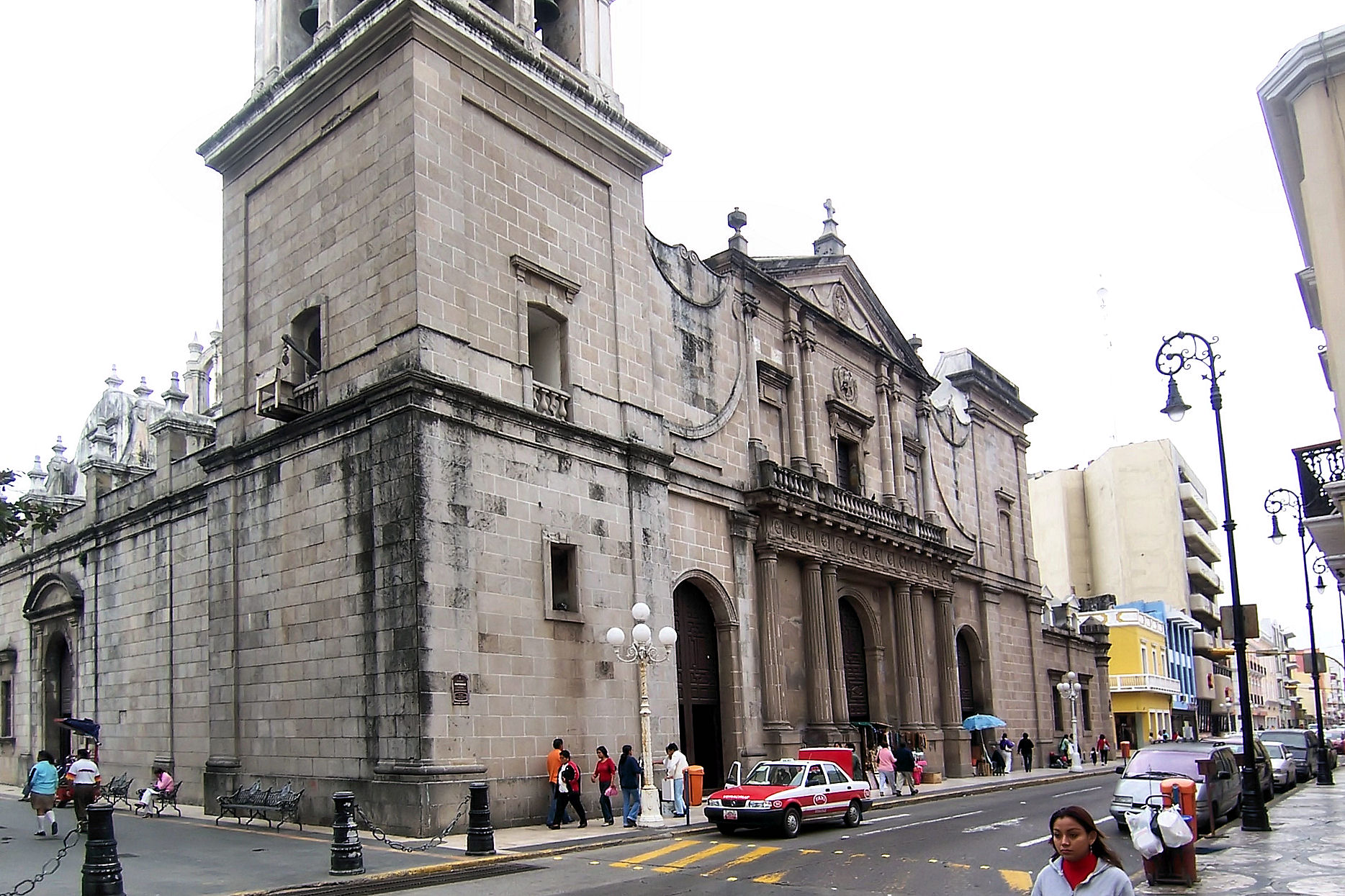
Cathedral of Veracruz

The cathedral building is in the form of a basilica and has a wide nave flanked by two aisles on either side. The octagonal dome has a small lantern and a covering of Puebla tiles. The three-staged tower also has a small dome.

The main entrance is constructed in a simple neoclassical style with two doors and a pediment. The first section has a half-pointed entrance arch guarded by even columns on the sides and two columns at the corners, both of Doric design, forming two grooves which support a cornice and the upper section. The choir window, surmounted by a medallion, stands in the centre of the second section. The same series of columns as in the lower section is repeated but now of Ionic design. A central triangular pediment is topped by a medallion.

The simple interior contains Baccarat crystal chandeliers and the high altar, donated by the Austria-Hungarian Empire.
