= Institutional and societal calendars of the Roman Rite =

Lists of saint feast days in Catholicism

Institutional and societal calendars of the Roman Rite of the Catholic Church are lists of saints' feast days and other liturgical celebrations, organized by calendar date, that apply to members of individual institutes of consecrated life (Note: In Catholic canon law, the term "institutes of consecrated life" includes both religious institutes (including religious orders and congregations) and secular institutes.) and societies of apostolic life of pontifical right that worship according to the Roman Rite of the Latin Church. They are "particular calendars" that build off of the General Roman Calendar.

== Institutes and societies ==
=== Augustinians ===
Includes the Discalced Augustinians and the Augustinian Recollects

- 3 January: Saint Fulgentius of Ruspe, bishop - Optional Memorial
- 4 January: Blessed Christine of the Holy Cross, virgin - Optional Memorial
- 8 January: Blessed Ugolino da Gualdo Cattaneo, priest - Optional Memorial
- 13 January: Blessed Veronica of Milan, virgin - Optional Memorial
- 18 January: Blessed Mattia Ciccarelli - Optional Memorial
- 23 January: Blessed Inés de Benigánim, virgin - Memorial
- 29 January: Blessed Anthony of Amandola, priest - Optional Memorial
- 3 February: Blessed Stephen Bellesini, priest - Memorial
- 6 February: Blessed Angelo da Furci, priest - Optional Memorial
- 7 February: Blessed Anselmo Polanco, bishop and martyr - Optional Memorial
- 9 February: Blessed Anne Catherine Emmerich - Optional Memorial
- 13 February: Blessed Agostina Camozzi - Optional Memorial
- 15 February: Blessed Giulia della Rena - Optional Memorial
- 16 February: Blessed Simon of Cascia, priest - Memorial
- 12 March: Blessed Jerome of Recanati, priest - Optional Memorial
- 22 March: Blessed Hugh Zefferini, priest - Optional Memorial
- 5 April: Blessed Mariano de la Mata, priest - Optional Memorial
- 18 April: Blessed Andrew of Montereale, priest - Optional Memorial
- 20 April: Blessed Simon Rinalducci, priest - Optional Memorial
- 23 April: Blessed Elena Valentinis - Optional Memorial
- 24 April: Conversion of Saint Augustine of Hippo - Feast
- 26 April: Our Lady of Good Counsel - Feast
- 8 May: Our Lady of Grace - Memorial
- 8 May: Blessed Catherine of Saint Augustine
- 11 May: Blessed Gregorio Celli, religious - Optional Memorial
- 12 May: Blessed William Tirry, priest and martyr - Optional Memorial
- 13 May: Our Lady of Help (perhaps related to Our Lady of Perpetual Help) - Memorial
- 16 May: Saint Alypius of Thagaste and Saint Possidius, bishops - Memorial
- 18 May: Blessed William of Toulouse, priest - Optional Memorial
- 19 May: Blessed Clemente da Osimo and Blessed Agostino Novello, priests - Memorial
- 22 May: Saint Rita of Cascia - Feast
- 4 June: Blessed Giacomo da Viterbo, bishop - Memorial
- 12 June: Saint John of Sahagún, priest - Memorilal
- 20 June: Blessed Philip of Piacenza, priest - Optional Memorial
- 25 June: Blessed Peter James of Pesaro, priest - Optional Memorial
- 2 July: Blesseds Giovanni Becchetti and Pietro Becchetti, priests - Optional Memorial
- 17 July: Blessed Magdelene Albrici, virgin - Optional Memorial
- 24 July: Blessed Anthony della Torre of l'Aquila, priest - Optional Memorial
- 27 July: Blessed Lucia Bufalari, virgin - Optional Memorial
- 2 August: Blessed John of Rieti, religious - Optional Memorial
- 17 August: Saint Clare of Montefalco, virgin - Feast
- 19 August: Saint Ezequiél Moreno y Díaz, bishop - Feast in the Augustinian Recollects, Memorial in others
- 26 August: Augustinian Martyrs of Gafsa in Africa - Optional Memorial
- 27 August: Saint Monica, mother of Saint Augustine - Feast
- 28 August: Saint Augustine of Hippo, bishop and doctor of the Church - Solemnity
- 4 September: Our Lady of Consolation - Solemnity
- 6 September: Blessed Angelo da Foligno, priest
- 10 September: Saint Nicholas of Tolentino, priest - Feast
- 19 September: Saint Alonso de Orozco Mena, priest - Memorial
- 28 September: Blessed Peter Zuñiga, Blessed 金鍔次兵衛 (Thomas Kintsuba Jihyoe of Saint Augustine), and other Augustinians among 205 Martyrs of Japan - Memorial
- 3 October: Blessed Angelo Scarpetti, priest - Optional Memorial
- 5 October: Blessed Sante da Cori, priest - Optional Memorial
- 9 October: Blessed Antonio Patrizi and the Blessed of Lecceto - Optional Memorial
- 10 October: Saint Thomas of Villanova, bishop - Feast
- 11 October: Blessed Mateo Elías Nieves Castillo, priest and martyr - Optional Memorial
- 12 October: Blessed Maria Giovanna Fasce, virgin - Optional Memorial
- 14 October: Blessed Gonçalo de Lagos, priest - Optional Memorial
- 20 October: Saint Magdalene of Nagasaki, virgin and martyr - Memorial
- 23 October: Saint William of Maleval, religious - Optional Memorial
- 23 October: Blessed John Good, religious - Optional Memorial
- 25 October: Saint John Stone (Feast in the Augustinian Families in England and Wales, Memorial in all others)
- 29 October: Blessed Peter Gubbio, priest - Optional Memorial
- 31 October: Blessed James of Cerqueto, priest - Optional Memorial
- 7 November: Blessed Grazia da Cattaro, religious - Optional Memorial
- 8 November: Blessed Avelino Rodríguez and 498 Spanish Martyrs - Optional Memorial
- 13 November: All Saints of Order of Saint Augustine - Feast (observed on November 14 as a Feast in the Augustinian Families in the United States)
- 29 November: Blessed Friedrich von Regensburg, religious - Optional Memorial
- 16 December: Blessed Cherubino Testa, priest - Optional Memorial

=== Barnabites ===
- 25 January: Conversion of Saint Paul – Feast (Solemnity for the Nuns)
- 30 January: Saint Francis Xavier M. Bianchi, priest – Memorial
- 24 May: Mary Help of Christians – Optional Memorial
- 30 June: Saint Paul the Apostle, Titular and Principal Patron of the Order – Feast
- 5 July: Saint Anthony Mary Zaccaria, priest and founder – Solemnity
- 11 October: Saint Alexander Sauli, bishop – Memorial
- Saturday before the Third Sunday of November: Our Lady, Mother of Divine Providence – Solemnity

=== Benedictines ===
According to the Calendar of the Benedictine Confederation (additional feasts may vary among congregations, or even among monasteries within a congregation):

- 10 January: Saint Gregory of Nyssa, bishop – Optional Memorial
- 15 January: Saint Maurus and Saint Placid, disciples of our Holy Father Benedict – Memorial
- 26 January: Saint Robert, Saint Alberic, and Saint Stephen, abbots of Cîteaux – Optional Memorial
- 10 February: Saint Scholastica, virgin – Feast
- 11 February: Saint Benedict of Aniane, abbot – Optional Memorial
- 21 February: Saint Peter Damian, bishop and Doctor of the Church – Memorial
- 9 March: Saint Frances of Rome, religious (Benedictine oblate) – Memorial
- 21 March: The Passing of Our Holy Father Benedict, abbot – Feast
- 21 April: Saint Anselm, bishop and Doctor of the Church – Memorial
- 23 April: Saint Adalbert, bishop and martyr – Optional Memorial
- 11 May: Saint Odo, Saint Majolus, Saint Odilo, Saint Hugh and Blessed Peter the Venerable, abbots of Cluny – Memorial
- 15 May: Saint Pachomius, abbot – Optional Memorial
- 19 May: Saint Celestine, pope and hermit – Optional Memorial
- 25 May: Saint Bede the Venerable, priest and Doctor of the Church – Memorial
- 27 May: Saint Augustine of Canterbury, bishop – Optional Memorial
- 19 June: Saint Romuald, abbot – Memorial
- 11 July: Our Holy Father Benedict, abbot – Solemnity
- 12 July: Saint John Gualbert, abbot – Optional Memorial
- 13 July: Saint Henry, Benedictine oblate – Optional Memorial
- 29 July: Saint Martha, Saint Mary and Saint Lazarus, hosts of the Lord – Memorial
- 19 August: Saint Bernard Tolomei, abbot – Optional Memorial
- 20 August: Saint Bernard of Clairvaux, abbot and Doctor of the Church – Memorial
- 3 September: Saint Gregory the Great, pope and Doctor of the Church – Feast
- 17 September: Saint Hildegard, virgin and Doctor of the Church – Optional Memorial
- 6 October: Saint Bruno, priest and hermit – Memorial
- 7 November: Saint Willibrord, bishop – Optional Memorial
- 11 November: Saint Martin of Tours, bishop – Feast
- 12 November: Saint Theodore the Studite, abbot – Optional Memorial
- 13 November: All Saints of the Order of Saint Benedict – Feast (in some monasteries)
- 14 November: Commemoration of All Deceased Benedictines (in some monasteries)
- 16 November: Saint Gertrude the Great, virgin – Memorial
- 19 November: Saint Mechtild, virgin – Optional Memorial
- 24 November: Saint Columban, abbot – Optional Memorial
- 26 November: Saint Silvester, abbot – Optional Memorial
- 5 December: Saint Saba, abbot – Optional Memorial

=== Brothers Hospitallers ===
- 20 January: Conversion of Saint John of God – Memorial
- 12 February: Blessed José Olallo Valdés, religious – Optional Memorial
- 8 March: Saint John of God, religious and founder – Solemnity
- 24 April: Saint Benedict Menni, priest – Memorial
- 26 April: Our Lady of Good Counsel – Optional Memorial
- 1 May: Saint Richard Pampuri, religious – Memorial
- 3 June: Saint Juan Grande Román, religious – Memorial
- 10 June: Blessed Joseph Kugler, religious – Optional Memorial
- 28 August: Saint Augustine of Hippo, bishop and Doctor of the Church – Feast
- 25 October: Blessed Braulio María Corres and companions, martyrs – Memorial
- 5 November: Commemoration of the Faithful Departed of the Order
- 17 November: Patronage of Our Lady over the Hospitaller Order – Solemnity
- 28 November: Translation of the Relics of Saint John of God – Optional Memorial

=== Brothers of the Christian Schools (Lasallians) ===
- 26 January: Translation of the relics of Jean-Baptiste de La Salle – Optional Memorial
- 27 January: Saints Timothy and Titus, bishops – Memorial
- 30 January: Saint Mutien-Marie Wiaux, religious – Memorial
- 9 February: Saint Miguel Febres Cordero – Memorial
- 26 April: Our Lady of Good Counsel – Memorial
- 27 April: Blessed Nicolas Roland, priest – Optional Memorial
- 8 May: Our Lady of the Star – Feast
- 15 May: Saint Jean-Baptiste de La Salle, priest and founder – Solemnity
- 19 May: Blessed Raphaël Rafiringa, religious – Optional Memorial
- 13 August: Saint Benildus Romançon, religious – Memorial
- 2 September: Saint Solomon Leclercq, Blessed Roger Faverge, and companion Rochefort martyrs – Optional Memorial
- 27 September: Blessed Jean-Bernard Rousseau, religious – Optional Memorial
- 9 October: Saint Cirilo Bertrán, Saint Jaime Hilario Barbal, and companion martyrs – Memorial
- 21 October: Blessed Nicolas Barré, priest – Optional Memorial
- 23 October: Blessed Arnould Rèche, religious – Optional Memorial
- 6 November: Blessed Leonardo José Aragonés Mateu and companions 498 Spanish Martyrs – Memorial
- 17 November – Dedication of the Church of Saint John Baptist de la Salle (at the Generalate in Rome) – Optional Memorial

=== Camillians ===
- 10 May: Blessed Enrico Rebuschini, priest – Memorial
- 22 May: Blessed Maria Domenica Brun Barbantini, religious – Optional Memorial
- 14 July: Saint Camillus de Lellis, priest and founder – Solemnity
- 26 September: Blessed Luigi Tezza, priest – Memorial
- 16 October: Blessed Giuseppina Vannini, virgin – Optional Memorial
- 25 October or the Sunday before the Solemnity of All Saints: Dedication of the Church (if the date is unknown) – Solemnity
- 16 November: Our Lady, Health of the Sick – Feast

=== Capuchins ===
Besides the celebrations listed in the Common Franciscan Calendar, the Capuchin Proper Calendar is as follows:

- 5 January: Blessed Diego José de Cádiz, religious – Optional Memorial (6 Jan. in the USA)
- 12 January: Saint Bernard of Corleone, religious – Memorial
- 4 February: Saint Joseph of Leonessa, priest – Memorial
- 9 February: Blessed Leopold of Alpandeire, religious – Optional Memorial
- 21 April: Saint Conrad of Parzham, religious – Memorial
- 24 April: Saint Fidelis of Sigmaringen, priest – Feast
- 30 April: Blessed Benedict of Urbino, priest – Optional Memorial
- 8 May: Blessed Jeremiah of Walachia, religious – Optional Memorial
- 11 May: Saint Ignatius of Laconi, religious – Memorial
- 12 May: Saint Leopold Mandić, priest – Memorial
- 18 May: Saint Felix of Cantalice, religious – Feast
- 19 May: Saint Crispin of Viterbo, religious – Memorial
- 27 May: Blessed José Tous y Soler, priest – Optional Memorial
- 2 June: Saint Felix of Nicosia, religious – Memorial
- 8 June: Blessed Nicholas of Gèsturi, religious – Optional Memorial
- 12 June: Blessed Florida Cevoli, nun – Optional Memorial
- 16 June: Blessed Anazet Koplinski and Companions, martyrs – Optional Memorial
- 26 June: Blessed Andrew Hyacinth Longhin, bishop – Optional Memorial
- 26 June: Blessed Yaccoub el-Haddad of Ghazir, priest – Optional Memorial
- 10 July: Saint Veronica Giuliani, nun – Feast
- 21 July: Saint Lawrence of Brindisi, priest and Doctor of the Church – Feast
- 27 July: Blessed Mary Magdalen Martinengo, nun – Optional Memorial
- 28 July: Blessed Mary Teresa Kowalska, nun and martyr – Optional Memorial
- 30 July: Blessed Solanus Casey, priest – Optional Memorial
- 7 August: Blesseds Agathangelo and Cassian, priests, martyrs – Optional Memorial
- 13 August: Blessed Mark of Aviano, priest – Optional Memorial
- 18 August: Blessed Capuchin Martyrs of Rochefort, priests, martyrs – Optional Memorial
- 23 August: Blessed Bernard of Offida, religious – Optional Memorial
- 2 September: Blessed Apollinaris of Posat, priest, martyr – Optional Memorial
- 19 September: Saint Francis Mary of Camporosso, religious – Memorial
- 22 September: Saint Ignatius of Santhià, priest – Memorial
- 23 September: Saint Pio of Pietrelcina (Padre Pio), priest – Solemnity
- 26 September: Blessed Aurelio of Vinalesa and Companions, martyrs – Optional Memorial
- 28 September: Blessed Innocent of Berzo, priest – Optional Memorial
- 12 October: Saint Seraphin of Montegranaro, religious – Memorial
- 13 October: Blessed Honorat Kożmiński, priest – Optional Memorial
- 25 October: Blessed María Jesús Masiá Ferragut and Companions, martyrs – Optional Memorial
- 31 October: Saint Angelo of Acri, priest – Memorial
- 6 November: Blessed Andrew of Palazuelo and Companions, martyrs – Optional Memorial
- 2 December: Blessed Mary Angela Astorch, nun – Optional Memorial
- 10 December. Blessed Arsenio of Trigolo, priest – Optional Memorial

=== Carmelites ===
- 3 January: Saint Kuriakose Elias Chavara, priest – Optional Memorial
- 8 January: Saint Peter Thomas, bishop – Feast
- 9 January: Saint Andrew Corsini, bishop – Feast
- 20 January: Blessed Angelo Paoli, priest – Optional Memorial
- 29 January: Blessed Arcangela Girlani, virgin – Optional Memorial
- 1 February: Blessed Candelaria of Saint Joseph, virgin – Optional Memorial
- 20 March: Blessed Francisco Palau y Quer, priest – Optional Memorial
- 17 April: Blessed Battista Spagnoli, priest – Memorial
- 4 May: Blesseds Angel Prat i Hostench, Luke of Saint Joseph, Tristany Pujoi and companions, priests and martyrs – Optional Memorial
- 5 May: Saint Angelus, priest and martyr – Memorial
- 8 May: Blessed Aloysius Rabatà, priest and martyr – Optional Memorial
- 9 May: Saint George Preca, priest – Memorial
- 16 May: Saint Simon Stock, religious – Memorial
- 22 May: Saint Joaquina Vedruna, religious – Optional Memorial
- 25 May: Saint Mary Magdalene de' Pazzi, virgin – Feast
- 12 June: Blessed Hilary Januszewski, priest and martyr – Optional Memorial
- 14 June: Saint Elisha, prophet – Memorial
- 4 July: Blessed Maria Crocifissa Curcio, virgin – Optional Memorial
- 9 July: Blessed Jane Scopelli, virgin – Optional Memorial
- 13 July: Saint Teresa of Jesus of the Andes, virgin – Optional Memorial
- 16 July: Solemn Commemoration of the Blessed Virgin Mary of Mount Carmel, Patroness of the Order – Solemnity
- 17 July: Blessed Teresa of Saint Augustine and companions, virgins and martyrs – Memorial
- 20 July: Saint Elijah, prophet and founder – Solemnity
- 24 July: Blessed John Soreth, priest – Optional Memorial
- 26 July: Saints Joachim and Anne, parents of the Virgin Mary and Protectors of the Order – Memorial
- 27 July: Saint Titus Brandsma, priest and martyr – Memorial
- 7 August: Saint Albert of Trapani, priest – Feast
- 9 August: Saint Teresa Benedicta of the Cross, virgin and martyr – Feast
- 12 August: Blessed Isidore Bakanja, martyr – Optional Memorial
- 17 August: Blessed Angelus Augustine Mazzinghi, priest – Optional Memorial
- 18 August: Blesseds Jean-Baptiste Duverneueil, Michael Louis Brulard and James Gagnot, priests and martyrs – Memorial
- 25 August: Saint Mary of Jesus Crucified, virgin – Memorial
- 26 August: Blessed Jacques Retouret, priest and martyr – Optional Memorial
- 1 September: Saint Teresa Margaret Redi, virgin – Optional Memorial
- 17 September: Saint Albert of Jerusalem, bishop and lawgiver of Carmel – Feast
- 1 October: Saint Therese of the Child Jesus, virgin and Doctor of the Church – Feast
- 15 October: Saint Teresa of Avila, virgin and Doctor of the Church – Feast
- 6 November: Saint Nuno of Saint Mary, religious – Memorial
- 8 November: Saint Elizabeth of the Trinity, virgin – Memorial
- 13 November: Blessed Maria Teresa Scrilli, virgin – Optional Memorial
- 14 November: All the Saints of the Carmelite Order – Feast
- 15 November: Commemoration of all the Faithful Departed of the Order
- 19 November: Saint Raphael Kalinowski, priest – Memorial
- 29 November: Blesseds Denis of the Nativity and Redemptus of the Cross, martyrs – Memorial
- 5 December: Blessed Bartholomew Fanti, priest – Optional Memorial
- 14 December: Saint John of the Cross, priest and Doctor of the Church – Feast

=== Carthusians ===
According to the Proper Rite and Calendar of the Carthusian Order approved on 30 November 2018:

- 3 January: Blessed Ayrald, monk and bishop – Optional Memorial
- 14 January: Blessed Odo, monk and bishop – Optional Memorial
- 4 February: Blessed Lanuin, monk – Optional Memorial
- 22 April: Saint Hugh of Grenoble, bishop
- 4 May: Saints John, Augustine, Robert and Blessed Companions, monks and martyrs
- 10 May: Blessed Nicholas Albergati, monk and bishop – Optional Memorial
- 24 May: Blessed William of Fenol, monk
- 25 June: Blessed John of Spain, monk
- 26 June: Saint Anthelm, monk and bishop
- 6 July: Saint Rosaline, virgin and nun
- 14 July: Blessed Boniface, monk and bishop – Optional Memorial
- 16 July: Blessed Claudius and Lazarus, and other Carthusian Martyrs
- 5 August: Blessed William Horn, monk and martyr
- 7 September: Saint Stephen, monk and bishop – Optional Memorial
- 6 October: Saint Bruno, monk – Solemnity
- 8 October: Saint Artold, monk and bishop – Optional Memorial
- 13 November: All the saints of the Carthusian Order, monks and nuns
- 14 November: The Departed Members of the Carthusian Order
- 17 November: Saint Hugh of Lincoln, monk and bishop
- 25 November: Blessed Beatrice, virgin and nun

=== Cistercians ===
According to the Proper Masses and Calendar of the Cistercian Order:

- 10 January: Saint Gregory of Nyssa, bishop; or Saint William of Bourges, bishop – Optional Memorial
- 12 January: Saint Aelred of Rievaulx, abbot – Memorial
- 15 January: Saint Maurus and Saint Placid, disciples of our Holy Father Benedict – Memorial
- 26 January: Saint Robert, Saint Alberic, and Saint Stephen, abbots of Cîteaux and founders of the Cistercian Order – Solemnity
- 30 January: Commemoration of the Deceased Superiors of the Order
- 1 February: Saint Raymond of Fitero, abbot – Optional Memorial
- 10 February: Saint Scholastica, virgin – Memorial (Feast for nuns)
- 11 February: Saint Benedict of Aniane, abbot – Optional Memorial
- 12 February: Blessed Humbeline, nun – Optional Memorial
- 16 February: Saint Peter de Castelnau, monk and martyr – Optional Memorial
- 21 February: Saint Peter Damian, bishop and Doctor of the Church – Memorial
- 8 March: Saint Stephen of Obazine, abbot – Optional Memorial
- 21 March: The Passing of Our Holy Father Benedict, abbot – Feast
- 21 April: Saint Anselm, bishop and Doctor of the Church – Memorial
- 22 April: Blessed Maria Gabriella Sagheddu, virgin – Optional Memorial
- 24 April: Saint Franca, virgin – Optional Memorial
- 11 May: Saint Odo, Saint Majolus, Saint Odilo, Saint Hugh and Blessed Peter the Venerable, abbots of Cluny – Memorial
- 15 May: Saint Pachomius, abbot – Memorial
- 19 May: Saint Celestine, pope and hermit – Optional Memorial
- 25 May: Saint Bede the Venerable, priest and Doctor of the Church – Memorial
- 12 June: Saint Aleydis, virgin – Optional Memorial
- 14 June: Blessed Gerard of Clairvaux, monk – Optional Memorial
- 16 June: Saint Lutgardis, virgin – Memorial
- 20 June: Commemoration of Deceased Parents and Brethren of the Cistercian Order
- 8 July: Blessed Eugene III, pope – Memorial
- 11 July: Our Holy Father Benedict, abbot – Solemnity
- 12 July: Saint John Gualbert, abbot – Optional Memorial
- 13 July: Saint Henry, Benedictine oblate – Optional Memorial
- 16 July: Blessed Virgin Martyrs of Orange – Optional Memorial
- 29 July: Saint Martha, Saint Mary and Saint Lazarus, hosts of the Lord – Memorial
- 19 August: Saint Guerric of Igny, abbot – Memorial
- 20 August: Our Holy Father Bernard, abbot and Doctor of the Church – Solemnity
- 30 August: Saints Guarinus and Amadeus, bishops – Optional Mamorial
- 10 September: Blessed Oglerius, abbot – Optional Memorial
- 12 September: Saint Peter of Tarentaise, bishop – Optional Memorial
- 17 September: Saint Martin de Finojosa, bishop; or Saint Hildegard, virgin and Doctor of the Church – Optional Memorial
- 18 September: Commemoration of Deceased Parents, Relatives, Friends, and Benefactors of the Cistercian Order who died within the year
- 6 October: Saint Bruno, priest – Memorial
- 9 October: Blessed Vincent Kadlubek, bishop – Optional Memorial
- 25 October: Saint Bernard Calbó, bishop – Optional Memorial
- 7 November: Saint Willibrord, bishop – Optional Memorial
- 11 November: Saint Martin of Tours, bishop – Feast
- 12 November: Saint Theodore the Studite, abbot – Optional Memorial
- 13 November: All Saints under the Rule of Saint Benedict – Feast
- 14 November: Commemoration of All Deceased Monastics under the Rule of Saint Benedict
- 16 November: Saint Gertrude the Great, virgin – Memorial (may be celebrated as a Feast for nuns)
- 19 November: Saint Mechtild, virgin – Optional Memorial
- 24 November: Saint Columban, abbot – Optional Memorial
- 26 November: Saint Silvester, abbot – Optional Memorial
- 5 December: Saint Saba, abbot – Optional Memorial
- 11 December: Blessed David, monk – Optional Memorial

=== Claretians ===
- 22 May: Saint Joaquina Vedruna, religious – Memorial
- Saturday following the second Sunday after Pentecost: Immaculate Heart of Mary, Patroness of the Congregation – Solemnity
- 15 June: Saint María Micaela of the Blessed Sacrament, virgin – Memorial
- 16 July: Our Lady of Mount Carmel – Feast
- 13 August: Blessed Felipe de Jésus Muñárriz, priest and companions, martyrs – Memorial
- 13 October: Blessed José María Ruiz Cano and companions, martyrs – Memorial
- 24 October: Saint Anthony Mary Claret, bishop – Solemnity
- 5 November: Commemoration of the Departed of the Congregations, family and benefactors
- 13 November: Blessed Patrocinio Giner Gomis, martyr – Memorial

=== Comboni Missionaries ===
- 8 February: Saint Josephine Bakhita, virgin – Memorial
- Last Saturday of May: Our Lady of the Sacred Heart – Memorial
- 9 September: Saint Peter Claver, priest and Patron of the Order – Solemnity
- 1 October: Saint Thérèse of the Child Jesus, virgin and doctor of the Church, Patroness of Missions – Feast
- 10 October: Saint Daniel Comboni, bishop and Founder of the Order – Solemnity
- 20 October: Blessed Daudi Okelo and Jildo Irwa, martyrs – Optional Memorial
- 3 December: Saint Francis Xavier, priest, Patron of Missions – Feast

=== Discalced Carmelites ===
- 3 January: Saint Kuriakose Elias Chavara, priest – Optional Memorial
- 8 January: Saint Peter Thomas, bishop – Optional Memorial
- 9 January: Saint Andrew Corsini, bishop – Optional Memorial
- 1 April: Saint Nuno of Saint Mary, religious – Optional Memorial
- 17 April: Blessed Battista Spagnoli, priest – Optional Memorial
- 18 April: Blessed Mary of the Incarnation, religious – Optional Memorial
- 16 May: Saint Simon Stock, religious – Optional Memorial
- 22 May: Saint Joaquina Vedruna, religious – Optional Memorial
- 25 May: Saint Mary Magdalene de' Pazzi, virgin – Memorial
- 7 June: Blessed Anne of Saint Bartholomew, virgin – Memorial
- 13 July: Saint Teresa of Jesus of the Andes, virgin – Optional Memorial
- 16 July: Our Lady of Mount Carmel, Patroness of the Order – Solemnity
- 17 July: Blessed Teresa of Saint Augustine and companions, virgins and martyrs – Memorial
- 20 July: Saint Elijah, prophet – Feast
- 23 July: Our Lady, Mother of Divine Grace – Memorial
- 24 July: Blesseds María Pilar, Teresa and María Angeles, virgins and martyrs – Optional Memorial
- 24 July: Blessed John Soreth, priest – Optional Memorial
- 27 July: Saint Titus Brandsma, priest and martyr – Optional Memorial
- 7 August: Saint Albert of Trapani, priest – Memorial
- 9 August: Saint Teresa Benedicta of the Cross, virgin and martyr – Optional Memorial
- 25 August: Saint Mary of Jesus Crucified, virgin – Optional Memorial
- 26 August: Transverberation of Saint Teresa of Avila – Memorial (for Nuns), Optional Memorial for others
- 1 September: Saint Teresa Margaret Redi, virgin – Memorial
- 12 September: Blessed Mary of Jesus, virgin – Memorial
- 17 September: Saint Albert of Jerusalem, bishop and lawgiver of Carmel – Feast
- 1 October: Saint Therese of the Child Jesus, virgin and Doctor of the Church – Feast
- 15 October: Saint Teresa of Avila, virgin, foundress and Doctor of the Church – Solemnity
- 6 November: Blessed Josefa Naval Girbés, virgin – Optional Memorial
- 7 November: Blessed Francisco Palau y Quer, priest – Optional Memorial
- 8 November: Saint Elizabeth of the Trinity, virgin – Memorial
- 14 November: All the Saints of the Order of the Discalced Carmelites – Feast
- 15 November: Commemoration of all the Faithful Departed of the Order
- 19 November: Saint Raphael Kalinowski, priest – Memorial
- 29 November: Blesseds Denis of the Nativity and Redemptus of the Cross, martyrs – Memorial
- 14 December: Saint John of the Cross, priest, founder and Doctor of the Church – Solemnity
- 16 December: Blessed Mary of the Angels, virgin – Optional Memorial

=== Dominicans ===
- 3 January: Most Holy Name of Jesus – Optional Memorial
- 4 January: Saint Zdislava Berka of Lemberk, lay Dominican and mother – Optional Memorial
- 7 January: Saint Ramon de Penyafort, friar and master of the order – Memorial
- 18 January: Saint Margaret of Hungary, nun and virgin – Optional Memorial
- 28 January: Saint Thomas Aquinas, friar and Doctor of the Church – Feast
- 4 February: Saint Caterina de' Ricci, sister and virgin – Optional Memorial
- 7 February: Anniversary of Deceased Fathers and Mothers
- 12 February: Blessed Reginald of Orléans, friar – Optional Memorial
- 13 February: Blessed Jordan von Sachsen, friar and master of the order – Memorial
- 18 February: Blessed Angelico (Giovanni da Fiesole), friar – Optional Memorial
- 20 April: Saint Agnese di Montepulciano, nun and virgin – Memorial
- 28 April: Saint Louis-Marie Grignion de Montfort, priest and Dominican tertiary – Optional Memorial
- 29 April: Saint Caterina da Siena, lay Dominican, virgin, and Doctor of the Church – Feast
- 30 April: Saint Pius V, pope and friar – Memorial
- 5 May: Saint Vicent Ferrer, friar – Memorial
- 10 May: Saint Antonino Pierozzi da Firenze, friar and bishop – Optional Memorial
- 19 May: Saint Francesc Coll i Guitart, friar – Optional Memorial
- 20 May: Blessed Hyacinthe-Marie Cormier, friar and master of the order – Optional Memorial
- 24 May: Translation of the Relics of Our Holy Father Dominic – Memorial
- 4 June: Saint Pietro da Verona, friar and martyr – Memorial
- 8 June: Blessed Diana degli Andalò and Blessed Cecilia Cesarini and Amata, nuns and virgins – Optional Memorial
- 10 June: Blessed Giovanni Dominici, friar and bishop – Optional Memorial
- 4 July: Saint Pier Giorgio Frassati, lay Dominican – Optional Memorial
- 9 July: Saint Joannes van Hoornaar, friar and martyr, and Companions, martyrs – Optional Memorial
- 9 July: Saint Francisco Fernández de Capillas, friar and martyr, Saint Pere Sans i Jordá, friar, bishop, and martyr, and Companions, martyrs in China – Optional Memorial
- 17 July: Blessed Czesław Odrowąż, friar – Optional Memorial
- 22 July: Saint Mary Magdalene, patroness of the Order – Feast
- 2 August: Blessed Juana Garcés de Aza, mother of Saint Dominic – Optional Memorial
- 8 August: Our Holy Father, Saint Dominic, friar, founder of the Order – Solemnity
- 17 August: Saint Jacek Hiacynt Odrowąż, friar – Memorial
- 18 August: Blessed Mannes (or Mames), friar and brother of Saint Dominic – Optional Memorial
- 23 August: Saint Rosa de Lima, lay Dominican and virgin – Memorial
- 28 August: Saint Augustinus Hipponensis, bishop and Doctor of the Church – Feast
- 5 September: Anniversary of Deceased Friends and Benefactors
- 18 September: Saint Juan Macías, friar – Optional Memorial
- 28 September: Saint Domingo Ibáñez de Erquicia, friar and martyr, Saint Jacobo Kyushei Gorobioye Tomonaga de Santa María, friar and martyr, Saint Lorenzo Ruiz ng Maynila, lay Dominican, husband, and protomartyr of the Philippines, and Companions, martyrs in Japan – Optional Memorial
- 28 September: or Blessed Alphonsus Navarrete, friar – Optional Memorials
- 4 October: Our Holy Father, Saint Francis of Assisi, deacon – Feast
- 5 October: Blessed Raimondo da Capua delle Vigne, friar and Master of the Order – Optional Memorial
- 7 October: Blessed Virgin Mary of the Holy Rosary (Our Lady of Victory) – Feast
- 9 October: Saint Lluís Bertran, friar – Memorial
- 3 November: Saint Martín de Porres Velázquez, lay brother – Feast
- 6 November: Blessed Buenaventura García de Paredes, friar, master of the Order, and martyr and Jacinto Serrano Lopez, martyr, and companions, martyrs – Optional Memorial
- 7 November: All Saints of the Order of Preachers – Feast
- 8 November: Anniversary of Deceased Brothers and Sisters
- 15 November: Saint Albertus Magnus, friar, bishop and Doctor of the Church – Feast
- 24 November: Saint Ignatius Delgado y Cebrian, friar, bishop, and martyr, Saint Vinh Sơn Phạm Hiếu Liêm, friar and martyr, Saint Dominic An-Kham Viet Pham, lay Dominican, father, and martyr, and companions, martyrs in Vietnam – Memorial
- 22 December: Anniversary of the Approval of the Order

=== Franciscans ===
From the Franciscan Supplement to the Roman Missal.

Note: Saints in the Franciscan Order are classified into First Order (members of male congregations such as the Order of Friars Minor [OFM], as well as the Conventual [OFMConv] and Capuchin Franciscans [OFMCap]), Second Order (cloistered female congregations, such as the Poor Clares), and Third Order (lay associates and other religious congregations that follow the Franciscan charism). The postnominals after the liturgical ranking signify celebrations proper to a particular branch or branches of the Franciscan family.

- 3 January: The Most Holy Name of Jesus – Memorial (All Families)
- 4 January: Saint Angela of Foligno, religious – Optional Memorial (OFMConv, III Order)
- 11 January: Saint Thomas of Cora, priest – Optional Memorial (OFM)
- 14 January: Blessed Odoric of Pordenone, priest – Memorial (OFM, OFMConv)
- 16 January: Saints Berard of Carbio and Companions, protomartyrs of the Franciscan Order – Feast (OFM), Memorial (Others)
- 19 January: Saint Eustochia Calafato, virgin – Optional Memorial (II Order)
- 20 January: Blessed John Baptist Triquerie, priest and martyr – Optional Memorial (OFMConv)
- 23 January: Saint Marianne Cope, virgin – Optional Memorial (OFMConv, III Order)
- 27 January: Saint Angela Merici, virgin and founder – Optional Memorial (All Families)
- 29 January: Blessed Francis Zirano, priest and martyr – Memorial (OFMConv)
- 30 January: Saint Hyacinth of Mariscotti, virgin – Memorial (All Families)
- 31 January: Saint John Bosco, priest, founder, secular Franciscan – Memorial (All Families)
- 6 February: Saint Pedro Bautista, Paul Miki and Companions, martyrs – Memorial (All Families)
- 7 February: Saint Colette of Corbie, virgin – Feast (II Order), Optional Memorial (Others)
- 7 February: Saint Giles Mary of St. Joseph, religious – Optional Memorial (OFM)
- 7 February: Saint John of Triora, priest and martyr – Optional Memorial (OFM)
- 19 February: Saint Conrad of Piacenza, religious – Memorial (III Order)
- 25 February: Blessed Sebastian of Aparicio, religious – Optional Memorial (OFM)
- 2 March: Saint Agnes of Prague, virgin – Feast (II Order), Memorial (OFM)
- 3 March: Blessed Liberatus Weiss and Companions, priests and martyrs – Optional Memorial (OFM)
- 5 March: Saint John Joseph of the Cross, priest – Optional Memorial (OFM)
- 12 March: Blessed Angela Salawa, laywoman – Optional Memorial (OFMConv)
- 18 March: Saint Salvator of Horta, religious – Optional Memorial (OFM)
- 22 March: Saint Benvenute Scotivoli of Osimo, bishop – Optional Memorial (OFM)
- 4 April: Saint Benedict the Black, religious – Optional Memorial (OFM)
- 5 April: Saint Mary Crescentia Höss, religious – Optional Memorial (III Order)
- 16 April: Saint Benedict Joseph Labre, religious – Optional Memorial (III Order)
- 21 April: Saint Conrad of Parzham, religious – Optional Memorial (OFMConv)
- 23 April: Saint Giles (Aegidius) of Assisi, religious – Optional Memorial (OFM, OFMConv, III Order)
- 24 April: Saint Fidelis of Sigmaringen, priest and martyr – Memorial (All Families except OFMCap)
- 24 April: Saint Peter of Saint Joseph de Betancur, missionary – Memorial (OFMConv)
- 28 April: Blessed Luchesius Modestini, religious – Optional Memorial (III Order)
- 4 May: Blesseds Thomas Bullaker and Henry Heath, priests, and Companions, martyrs – Optional Memorial (OFM)
- 8 May: Blessed Virgin Mary, Mediatrix of all Graces – Optional Memorial (OFM)
- 9 May: Saint Catherine of Bologna, virgin – Memorial (II Order and III Order nuns), Optional Memorial (Others)
- 12 May: Saint Leopold Mandic, priest – Memorial (All Families)
- 13 May: Saint Peter Regalado, priest – Optional Memorial (OFM)
- 16 May: Saint Margaret of Cortona, religious – Feast (III Order), Memorial (Others)
- 17 May: Saint Paschal Baylon, religious – Memorial (All Families)
- 18 May: Saint Felix of Cantalice, religious – Memorial (All Families except OFMCap)
- 19 May: Saint Theophilus of Corte, priest – Optional Memorial (OFM)
- 20 May: Saint Bernardine of Siena, priest – Feast (OFM), Memorial (Others)
- 24 May: Dedication of the Basilica of Our Holy Father Francis – Feast (All Families)
- 28 May: Saint Mariana de Jesús de Paredes, virgin – Optional Memorial (III Order)
- 30 May: Saint Ferdinand III of Castile, king – Optional Memorial (III Order)
- 30 May: Saint Baptista Varano, virgin – Optional Memorial (II Order)
- 12 June: Blessed Jolenta, religious – Optional Memorial (II Order)
- 12 June: Blessed Antonin Bajewski and Pius Bartosik, priests, and Companions, martyrs – Optional Memorial (OFMConv)
- 13 June: Saint Anthony of Padua, priest and Doctor of the Church – Feast (All Families)
- 16 June: Blessed John of Parma, priest – Optional Memorial (OFM)
- 20 June: Blessed Patrick O'Hely, Bishop, and Companions, martyrs – Optional Memorial (OFM)
- 22 June: Saint John Fisher, bishop, and Saint Thomas More, layman, martyrs, secular Franciscans – Optional Memorial (All Families)
- 30 June: Saint Raymond Llull, martyr – Optional Memorial (III Order)
- 4 July: Saint Elizabeth of Portugal, queen – Optional Memorial (III Order)
- 8 July: Saint Gregory Grassi, bishop, and Companions, martyrs, – Optional Memorial (OFM)
- 9 July: Saint Nicholas Pieck, priest, and companions, martyrs – Optional Memorial (OFM)
- 10 July: Saint Veronica Giuliani, virgin – Memorial (All Families except OFMCap friars and nuns)
- 12 July: Saint John Jones and John Wall, priests and martyrs – Optional Memorial (OFM)
- 13 July: Blessed Angeline of Marsciano, foundress – Optional Memorial (III Order)
- 13 July: Blessed Emmanuel Ruiz, priest, and Companions, martyrs – Optional Memorial (OFM)
- 14 July: Saint Francis Solano, priest – Optional Memorial (OFM)
- 15 July: Saint Bonaventure, bishop and Doctor of the Church – Feast (All Families)
- 18 July: Saint Simon of Lypnica, priest – Optional Memorial (OFM)
- 19 July: Saint John of Dukla, priest – Optional Memorial (OFM)
- 21 July: Saint Lawrence of Brindisi, priest and Doctor of the Church – Memorial (All Families except OFMCap)
- 23 July: Saint Bridget of Sweden, religious – Optional Memorial (All Families)
- 23 July: Saint Kinga, religious – Optional Memorial (II Order)
- 24 July: Saint Louise of Savoy, religious – Optional Memorial (II Order)
- 24 July: Blessed Antonio Lucci, bishop – Optional Memorial (OFMConv)
- 27 July: Blessed Mary Magdalene Martinengo, virgin – Optional Memorial (II Order)
- 2 August: Our Lady of the Angels of the Portiuncula – Feast (All Families)
- 4 August: Saint Jean Marie Vianney, priest, secular Franciscan – Memorial (All Families)
- 5 August: Blessed Frédéric Janssoone, priest – Optional Memorial (OFM)
- 8 August: Saint Dominic de Guzman, priest, founder of the Dominican Order – Feast (All Families)
- 9 August: Blessed Maria Francesca Rubatto, virgin and foundress – Optional Memorial (III Order)
- 11 August: Saint Clare of Assisi, virgin – Solemnity (II Order and III Order nuns), Feast (Others)
- 14 August: Saint Maximilian Kolbe, priest and martyr – Feast (OFMConv), Memorial (Others)
- 16 August: Saint Roch of Montpellier, layman – Optional Memorial (III Order)
- 17 August: Saint Beatrice of Silva, virgin and foundress – Memorial (OFM)
- 18 August: Blessed Louis-Armand Adam and Nicholas Savouret, priests and martyrs, priests, martyrs – Optional Memorial (OFMConv)
- 19 August: Saint Louis of Toulouse, bishop – Memorial (OFM)
- 21 August: Saint Pius X, pope, secular Franciscan – Memorial
- 25 August: Saint Louis IX of France, king, Patron of the III Order – Feast (III Order), Memorial (Others)
- 26 August: Saint Junípero Serra, priest – Optional Memorial (OFM)
- 2 September: Blessed John Francis Burté, Blessed Severin Girault, and Companions, martyrs – Optional Memorial (OFM, OFMConv, III Order)
- 4 September: Saint Rose of Viterbo, virgin – Optional Memorial (OFMConv, III Order)
- 10 September: Blessed Agnellus of Pisa, priest – Optional Memorial (OFM)
- 11 September: Blessed Bonaventure of Barcelona, religious – Optional Memorial (OFM)
- 17 September: Receiving of the Stigmata of Our Holy Father Francis – Feast (All Families)
- 18 September: Saint Joseph of Cupertino, priest – Feast (OFMConv), Memorial (Others)
- 23 September: Saint Pius of Pietrelcina, priest – Memorial (All Families)
- 24 September: Saint Pacificus of San Severino, priest – Optional Memorial (OFM)
- 24 September: Finding the Body of Saint Clare of Assisi – Optional Memorial (II Order)
- 26 September: Saint Elzéar of Sabran and Blessed Delphine of Glandèves, married couple – Optional Memorial (III Order)
- 4 October: Our Holy Father Francis of Assisi, deacon, founder of the Three Orders – Solemnity (All Families)
- 10 October: Saint Daniel, priest, and Companions, martyrs – Optional Memorial (OFM)
- 10 October: Blessed Mary Angela Truszkowska, virgin and foundress – Optional Memorial (III Order)
- 11 October: Saint John XXIII, pope, secular Franciscan – Optional Memorial (All Families)
- 19 October: Saint Peter of Alcantara, priest – Memorial (OFM)
- 20 October: Blessed James of Strepar, bishop – Optional Memorial (OFMConv)
- 20 October: Blessed Contardo Ferrini, educator – Optional Memorial (III Order)
- 22 October: Blessed Josephine Leroux, virgin and martyr – Optional Memorial (II Order)
- 23 October: Saint John of Capistrano, priest – Memorial (All Families)
- 24 October: Saint Anthony of St. Ann Galvão, priest and founder – Optional Memorial (OFM)
- 26 October: Blessed Bonaventure of Potenza, priest – Optional Memorial (OFMConv)
- 30 October: Anniversary of Dedication in Consecrated Churches of the Order (if date is unknown) – Solemnity (All Families)
- 4 November: Saint Charles Borromeo, bishop, Protector of the Friars Minor – Optional Memorial (All Families)
- 5 November: Commemoration of All Deceased Friars of the Franciscan Order (may also be celebrated on any feria after 4 October but before Advent)
- 8 November: Blessed John Duns Scotus, priest – Memorial (OFM), Optional Memorial (OFMConv, III Order)
- 13 November: Saint Didacus of Alcala, religious – Optional Memorial (OFM)
- 14 November: Saint Nicholas Tavelic and Companions, martyrs – Memorial (All Families)
- 17 November: Saint Elizabeth of Hungary, Patroness of the III Order – Feast (All Families)
- 18 November: Blessed Salome of Cracow, virgin – Optional Memorial (II Order)
- 19 November: Saint Agnes of Assisi, virgin – Memorial (II Order)
- 20 November: Blessed Pascual Fortuño Almela, priest, and Companions, martyrs - Optional Memorial (OFM)
- 22 November: Blessed Salvatore Lilli, priest, and Companions, martyrs – Optional Memorial (OFM)
- 25 November: Blessed Humilis of Bisignano, religious – Optional Memorial (OFM)
- 26 November: Saint Leonard of Port Maurice, priest – Memorial (All Families)
- 27 November: Saint Francis Anthony Fasani, priest – Optional Memorial (All Families)
- 28 November: Saint James of the Marches, priest – Memorial (OFM), Optional Memorial (OFMConv)
- 29 November: All Saints of the Seraphic Order – Feast (All Families)
- 2 December: Blessed Maria Angela Astorch, virgin – Memorial (II Order)
- 2 December: Blessed Raphael Chylinski, priest – Optional Memorial (OFMConv)
- 8 December: Immaculate Conception of the Blessed Virgin Mary, Patroness and Queen of the Franciscan Order – Solemnity (All Families)
- 15 December: Blessed Mary Frances Schervier, virgin and foundress – Optional Memorial (III Order)

=== Jesuits ===
- 3 January: Most Holy Name of Jesus, Titular Feast of the Society of Jesus – Solemnity
- 19 January: Saint John Ogilvie, priest; Saints Stephen Pongrácz, Melchior Grodiziecki, priests, and Mark of Krizevci, Canon of Esztergom; Blessed Ignatius de Azevedo, priest, and companions; Blessed James Salès, priest, and William Saultemouche, religious, martyrs – Optional Memorial
- 4 February: Saint John de Britto, priest; Blessed Rudolph Acquaviva, priest, and companions, martyrs – Optional Memorial
- 6 February: Saint Paul Miki, religious, and companions; Blessed Charles Spinola, Sebastian Kimura, priests, and companions, martyrs – Memorial
- 15 February: Saint Claude La Colombière, priest – Memorial
- 19 March: Saint Joseph, Spouse of the Blessed Virgin Mary, Patron of the Society of Jesus – Solemnity
- 22 April: The Blessed Virgin Mary, Mother of the Society of Jesus – Feast
- 27 April: Saint Peter Canisius, priest and Doctor of the Church – Memorial
- 4 May: Saint José María Rubio, priest – Optional Memorial
- 8 May: Blessed John Sullivan, priest - Optional Memorial
- 16 May: Saint Andrew Bobola, priest and martyr – Optional Memorial
- 24 May: Our Lady of the Way – Optional Memorial
- 8 June: Saint James Berthieu, priest and martyr – Memorial
- 9 June: Saint Joseph of Anchieta, priest – Optional Memorial
- 21 June: Saint Aloysius Gonzaga, religious – Memorial
- 2 July: Saints Bernardine Realino, John Francis Régis, and Francis Jerome; Blessed Julian Maunoir, Anthony Baldinucci, Tiburcio Arnáiz Muñoz, and Johann Philipp Jeningen, priests – Optional Memorial
- 9 July: Saints Leo Ignatius Mangin, priest, Mary Zhu Wu, and companions, martyrs – Memorial
- 31 July: Saint Ignatius of Loyola, priest and founder of the Society of Jesus – Solemnity
- 2 August: Saint Peter Faber, priest – Optional Memorial
- 18 August: Saint Alberto Hurtado Cruchaga, priest – Memorial
- 2 September: Blessed Eduard Profittlich, bishop; Blessed James Bonnaud, priest, and companions; Blessed Joseph Imbert and John Nicolas Cordier, priests; Blessed Thomas Sitjar, priest, and companions; Blessed John Fausti, priest, and companions; Blessed Victor Dillard, priest, martyrs – Optional Memorial
- 9 September: Saint Peter Claver, priest – Memorial
- 10 September: Blessed Francis Gárate Aranguren, religious – Optional Memorial
- 17 September: Saint Robert Bellarmine, bishop and Doctor of the Church – Memorial
- 3 October: Saint Francis Borgia, priest – Memorial
- 12 October: Blessed John Beyzym, priest – Memorial
- 19 October: Saints John de Brébeuf, Isaac Jogues, priests, and companions, martyrs – Memorial
- 21 October: Blessed Diego Luis de San Vitores, priest, and Saint Pedro Calungsod, martyrs – Optional Memorial
- 30 October: Blessed Dominic Collins, religious and martyr – Optional Memorial
- 31 October: Saint Alphonsus Rodriguez, religious – Memorial
- 3 November: Blessed Rupert Mayer, priest – Optional Memorial
- 5 November: All Saints of the Society of Jesus – Feast
- 6 November: The Commemoration of All the Departed of the Society of Jesus
- 13 November: Saint Stanislaus Kostka, religious – Memorial
- 14 November: Saint Joseph Pignatelli, priest – Memorial
- 16 November: Saints Roch González, Alphonsus Rodríguez, and John del Castillo, priests; Blessed Juan Antonio Solinas, priest, martyrs – Optional Memorial
- 23 November: Blessed Miguel Agustín Pro and Victor Emilio Moscoso Cárdenas, priests; Blessed Rutilio Grande García, priest, and companions (Manuel Solórzano and Nelson Rutilio Lemus), martyrs – Optional Memorial
- 26 November: Saint John Berchmans, religious – Memorial
- 29 November: Blessed Bernardo Francisco de Hoyos de Seña, priest – Optional Memorial
- 1 December: Saints Edmund Campion, Robert Southwell, priests, and companions, martyrs – Memorial
- 3 December: Saint Francis Xavier, priest – Feast

=== Mercedarians ===
- 17 April: Blessed Marianna of Jesus Navarro, virgin – Memorial
- 27 April: Saint Peter Armengol, religious and martyr – Memorial
- 13 May: Saint Peter Nolasco, religious and founder – Solemnity
- 9 July: Most Holy Redeemer – Feast
- 28 August: Saint Augustine, bishop and Doctor of the Church – Feast
- 31 August: Saint Raymond Nonnatus, priest – Feast
- 19 September: Saint Mary of Cervellon, virgin – Memorial (Feast for Nuns)
- 24 September: Our Lady of Mercy – Solemnity
- 25 October: Dedication of the Church (if date is unknown) – Solemnity
- 6 November: All the Saints of the Order – Feast
- 7 November: Commemoration of All of the Faithful Departed of the Order
- 14 November: Saint Serapion, religious and martyr – Memorial
- 6 December: Saint Peter Paschasius, bishop and martyr – Memorial

=== Missionaries of Charity ===
- 30 April: Saint Joseph Benedict Cottolengo, priest – Memorial
- 16 August: Queenship of Blessed Virgin Mary – Memorial
- 22 August: Immaculate Heart of Mary, Patroness of the Congregation – Solemnity
- 5 September: Saint Teresa of Calcutta, virgin and foundress – Feast

=== Missionary Oblates of Mary Immaculate ===
- 17 February: Anniversary of Papal Approval to the Order – Feast
- 21 May: Saint Eugene de Mazenod, bishop and founder – Feast
- 29 May: Blessed Joseph Gerard, priest – Memorial
- 12 June: Blessed Jozef Cebula and companions, martyrs – Memorial
- 3 November: Commemoration of all deceased members of the Order
- 28 November: Blessed Francisco Esteban and companions, martyrs – Memorial
- 16 December: Blessed Joseph Thao Tien and companions, martyrs – Memorial

=== Missionaries of the Precious Blood ===
- 4 February: Saint Maria de Mattias, virgin – Memorial
- 12 May: Our Lady, Mother of Mercy – Optional Memorial
- 24 May: Our Lady, Help of Christians – Memorial
- 1 July: The Most Precious Blood of Our Lord Jesus Christ, Titular Feast of the Congregation – Solemnity
- 15 September: Our Lady of Sorrows, Woman of the New Covenant – Memorial
- 21 October: Saint Gaspar del Bufalo, priest and founder – Solemnity
- 3 December: Saint Francis Xavier, priest; Patron of the Congregation – Feast

=== Murialdines ===
- 19 March: Saint Joseph, Spouse of the Blessed Virgin Mary, Titular and Principal Patron of the Congregation of St. Joseph – Solemnity
- 1 May: Saint Joseph the Worker – Feast
- 18 May: Saint Leonardo Murialdo, priest and founder of the congregation – Solemnity

=== Norbertines ===
- 5 January: Blessed Gerlac of Valkenburg – Feast
- 14 January: Saint Godfrey of Cappenberg – Memorial
- 4 February: Saint Frederic of Mariengaarde – Memorial
- 10 February: Blessed Hugh of Fosse – Feast
- 17 February: Saint Evermode of Ratzeburg – Memorial
- 20 April: Blessed Oda of Bonne Rivreuille, virgin – Feast
- 26 April: Saint Ludolph of Ratzeburg – Memorial
- 24 May: Saint Hermann-Joseph of Steinfeld – Memorial
- 6 June: Saint Norbert of Xanten, bishop and Founder of the Order – Solemnity
- 15 June: Saint Isfried of Ratzeburg – Memorial
- 9 July: Saints Adrian and James of Middelburg, martyrs – Memorial
- 14 July: Blessed Hroznata of Tepla – Memorial
- 13 August: Blessed Gertrude of Altenburg, virgin – Feast
- 28 August: Saint Augustine of Hippo, bishop and doctor of the Church – Solemnity
- 30 August: Blessed Bronislava of Zwierzniec, virgin – Feast
- 13 October: Blessed Peter-Adrian Toulorge of Blanchelande, martyr – Feast
- 20 October: Blessed Jakob (James) Kern of Geras – Memorial
- 26 October: Saint Gilbert of Neuffontaines – Memorial
- 29 October: Blessed Ricvera of Clastres, virgin – Feast
- 13 November: All Saints of the Order – Feast
- 14 November: Saint Siard of Mariengaarde – Memorial

=== Oratorians ===
- 16 January: Saint Joseph Vaz, priest – Optional Memorial
- 30 January: Blessed Sebastian Valfrè, priest – Memorial
- 26 May: Saint Philip Neri, priest and founder – Solemnity
- 30 August: Blessed Juvenal Ancina, bishop – Memorial
- 5 October: Saint Luigi Scrosoppi, priest – Memorial
- 9 October: Saint John Henry Newman, priest – Optional Memorial
- 15 December: Blessed Antonio Grassi, priest – Optional Memorial

=== Passionists ===
- 5 January: Saint Charles Houben of Mount Argus, priest – Optional Memorial
- 27 February: Saint Gabriel of Our Lady of Sorrows, religious – Feast
- Friday before Ash Wednesday: Solemn Commemoration of the Passion of Our Lord Jesus Christ – Solemnity
- Tuesday before Ash Wednesday: Memorial of Our Lord's Agony in the Garden – Memorial
- Second Friday after Easter Sunday: The Glorious Wounds of Our Lord Jesus Christ – Memorial
- 16 May: Saint Gemma Galgani, virgin – Memorial
- 12 June: Blessed Lawrence Salvi of Saint Francis Xavier, priest – Optional Memorial
- 1 July: The Most Precious Blood of Our Lord Jesus Christ – Feast
- 6 July: Saint Maria Goretti, virgin and martyr – Memorial
- 9 July: Our Lady, Mother of Holy Hope – Optional Memorial
- 24 July: Blessed Nicephorous Tejerina and companions, martyrs – Optional Memorial
- 26 August: Blessed Dominic of the Mother of God, priest – Memorial
- 15 September: Our Lady of Sorrows – Feast
- 24 September: Saint Vincent Strambi, bishop – Memorial
- 6 October: Blessed Isidore de Loor of Saint Joseph, religious – Optional Memorial
- 9 October: Saint Innocencio Canoura of Mary Immaculate, priest and martyr – Optional Memorial
- 19 October: Saint Paul of the Cross, priest and founder – Solemnity
- 3 November: Blessed Pius Campidelli of Saint Aloysius, religious – Optional Memorial
- 5 November: Commemoration of All the Faithful Departed of the Congregation of Passion
- 13 November: Blessed Eugene Bossilkov, bishop and martyr – Optional Memorial
- 18 November: Blessed Grimoaldo Santamaría of the Purification, religious – Optional Memorial
- 9 December: Blessed Bernard Mary of Jesus, priest – Optional Memorial

=== Pauline Family ===
- Saturday after the Ascension: Our Lady, Queen of the Apostles – Feast
- 30 June: Saint Paul the Apostle, Patron Saint of the Congregation – Solemnity
- 3 September: Our Lady, Mother of the Good Shepherd – Memorial
- 4 September: Saint Gregory the Great, pope and Doctor of the Church – Memorial
- 22 October: Blessed Timothy Giaccardo, priest – Memorial
- Last Sunday of October: Jesus, Divine Master – Solemnity
- 26 November: Blessed James Alberione, priest and founder – Feast

=== Piarists ===
- 6 February: Saint Dorothy, virgin and martyr – Optional Memorial
- 26 February: Saint Paula Montal, virgin – Optional Memorial
- 8 March: Saint Faustino Míguez, priest – Optional Memorial
- 18 March: Blessed Celestina Donati, virgin – Optional Memorial
- 8 May: Our Lady, Mother of God of the Pious Schools – Feast
- 15 July: Saint Pompilio Maria Pirrotti, priest – Memorial
- 25 August: Saint Joseph Calasanctius, priest and founder – Solemnity
- 12 September: Most Holy Name of Mary – Feast
- 17 September: Blessed Anthony Mary Schwartz, priest – Optional Memorial
- 19 September: Blessed María Baldillou and companions, martyrs – Optional Memorial (Memorial for Nuns)
- 22 September: Blessed Dionisio Pamplona, priest and companions, martyrs – Memorial
- 17 October: Blessed Peter Casani, priest – Memorial
- 25 October: Dedication of the Church (if date is unknown) – Solemnity
- 3 November: Commemoration of All the Faithful Departed of the Order
- 4 November: Commemoration of All the Departed Family, Benefactors of the Order
- 6 November: Commemoration of All the Departed Priests of the Order
- 7 November: Commemoration of All the Departed Nuns of the Order
- 27 November: Patronage of Saint Joseph Calasanctius – Optional Memorial

=== Redemptorists ===
- 5 January: Saint John Nepomucene Neumann, bishop – Memorial
- 14 January: Blessed Peter Donders, priest – Optional Memorial
- 15 March: Saint Clement Mary Hofbauer, religious – Feast
- Thursday after the Solemnity of the Sacred Heart: Eucharistic Heart of Jesus – Optional Memorial
- 27 June: Our Lady of Perpetual Help – Feast
- 28 June: Blessed Nicholas Charnetsky, bishop and companions, martyrs – Optional Memorial
- 30 June: Blessed Jenaro Maria Samelli, priest – Memorial
- Third Sunday of July: The Most Holy Redeemer, Titular of the Congregation - Solemnity
- 1 August: Saint Alphonsus Mary Liguori, bishop, founder and Doctor of the Church – Solemnity
- 25 August: Blessed Methodius Dominic Trčka, martyr – Optional Memorial
- 26 September: Blessed Gaspar Stanggsinger, priest – Optional Memorial
- 5 October: Blessed Francis Xavier Seelos, priest – Optional Memorial
- 16 October: Saint Gerard Majella, religious – Memorial
- 7 November: Blessed José Javier Gorosterratzu Jaunarena and companions, martyrs – Memorial

=== Rogationists ===
- 31 January: Most Holy Name of Jesus - Feast
- 1 February: Saint John Bosco, Priest - Memorial
- Saturday before the 4th Sunday of Easter: Blessed Virgin Mary, Queen and Mother of the Rogationists – Memorial
- 1 June: Saint Hannibal Mary di Francia, priest and founder – Solemnity
- 2 June: Saint Justin, martyr – Memorial
- 13 June: Saint Anthony of Padua, priest, doctor of the Church and principal patron of the Order – Solemnity
- 1 July: The Most Holy Eucharist – Memorial
- 19 September: Our Lady of La Salette, Reconciler of Sinners – Memorial
- 27 September: Blessed Virgin Mary, Mother of the Orphans – Memorial

=== Society of St. Francis de Sales (Salesian Priests and Sisters) ===
- 8 January: Blessed Titus Zeman, priest and martyr – Memorial
- 15 January: Blessed Luigi Variara, priest – Memorial (Optional Memorial for the Daughters of Mary Help of Christians (FMA) and the Volunteers of Don Bosco (VDB))
- 22 January: Blessed Laura Vicuña – Optional Memorial (Memorial for FMA)
- 24 January: Saint Francis of Sales, bishop and Doctor of the Church, Titular of the Congregation – Feast
- 30 January: Blessed Bronislaus Markiewicz – Optional Memorial (For the Salesian Priests (SDB) only)
- 31 January: Our Holy Father and Founder Saint John Bosco, priest, founder and patron of the Congregation – Solemnity
- 1 February: Commemoration of all deceased Salesian Confreres (For SDB only)
- 7 February: Blessed Pius IX, pope – Optional Memorial
- 9 February: Blessed Eusebia Palomino Yenes, virgin – Optional Memorial (Memorial for FMA)
- 25 February: Saint Luigi Versiglia, bishop and Saint Callistus Caravario, priest, Salesian Protomartyrs – Feast (Memorial for FMA and VDB)
- 6 May: Saint Dominic Savio – Feast
- 13 May: Saint Mary Domenica Mazzarello, virgin and cofoundress of the congregation – Feast (Solemnity for FMA)
- 14 May: Commemoration of Deceased parents of the Daughters of Mary Help of Christians (FMA only)
- 15 May: Our Lady of Fatima – Memorial (Optional for FMA and VDB)
- 16 May: Saint Louis Orione, priest – Memorial
- 18 May: Saint Leonardo Murialdo, priest – Optional Memorial
- 24 May: Mary, Help of Christians, Principal Patroness of the Salesian Society of St. Francis de Sales (Salesians of Don Bosco), Principal Patroness and Titular of the Institute of the Daughters of Mary Help of Christians – Solemnity
- 25 May: Commemoration of Deceased Daughters of Mary Help of Christians (For FMA only)
- 29 May: Blessed Joseph Kowalski, priest and martyr – Memorial (Optional Memorial for FMA and VDB)
- 8 June: Blessed István Sándor, martyr – Memorial
- 12 June: Blessed Francis Kesy and companions, martyrs – Optional Memorial
- 23 June: Saint Joseph Cafasso, priest – Memorial
- 7 July: Blessed Maria Romero Meneses, virgin – Optional Memorial (Memorial for FMA)
- 2 August: Blessed Augustus Czartoryski, priest – Optional Memorial
- 25 August: Blessed Maria Troncatti, virgin – Optional Memorial
- 26 August: Blessed Zeferino Namuncura – Optional Memorial
- 22 September: Blesseds Joseph Calasanz, Henry Saiz, Enrique Aparicio, priests and companions, martyrs – Memorial (Optional Memorial for VDB)
- 5 October: Blessed Alberto Marvelli – Optional Memorial (For SDB only)
- 13 October: Blessed Alexandrina da Costa, virgin – Optional Memorial
- 15 October: Saint Teresa of Avila, virgin and Doctor of the Church, Secondary Patroness of the Daughters of Mary, Help of Christians - Feast (For FMA only)
- 24 October: Saint Luigi Guanella, priest – Optional Memorial
- 25 October: Dedication of the Church (if date of dedication is unknown) – Solemnity
- 27 October: Dedication of the Basilica of Our Lady Help of Christians, Turin – Feast (Solemnity in the Basilica itself)
- 29 October: Blessed Michael Rua, priest and first successor of Don Bosco – Memorial
- 13 November: Saint Artémides Zatti, religious – Memorial (Optional Memorial for FMA)
- 15 November: Blessed Maddalena Caterina Morano, virgin – Optional Memorial
- 5 December: Blessed Philip Rinaldi, priest and third successor of Don Bosco – Memorial (Feast for VDB)

=== Somascans ===
- 8 February: Saint Jerome Emiliani, founder – Solemnity
- 14 March: Patronage of Saint Jerome Emiliani over Orphans and Abandoned Youth – Memorial
- 29 April: Anniversary of the Foundation of the Order – Feast
- 27 September: Blessed Virgin Mary, Mother of the Orphans – Solemnity

=== Salvatorians ===
- 21 July: Blessed Francis Mary of the Cross Jordan - Feast
- 5 September: Blessed Mary of the Apostles (Maria Therese von Wüllenweber) – Feast
- 11 October: Mary, Mother of the Saviour – Solemnity
- 25 December: Solemnity of the Nativity of the Lord - Patronal Feast of the Salvatorians

=== Servites Maria ===
- 12 January: Saint Anthony Mary Pucci, priest – Feast
- 15 January: Blessed James of Pieve, religious – Optional Memorial
- 3 February: Blessed Joachim of Sienna – Memorial
- 17 February: Seven Holy Founders of the Order – Solemnity
- 19 February: Blessed Elizabeth Picenardi, virgin – Optional Memorial
- Friday after the Fifth Sunday of Lent: Our Lady at the Foot of the Cross – Feast
- 4 May: Saint Peregrine Laziosi, religious – Feast
- 8 May: Our Lady, Mother and Mediatrix of All Graces – Optional Memorial
- 11 May: Blessed John Benincasa, religious – Optional Memorial
- 12 May: Blessed Francis of Sienna, priest – Memorial
- 30 May: Blessed James Bertoni, priest – Memorial
- 19 June: Saint Juliana Falconieri, virgin – Feast (Solemnity for the Nuns)
- 27 June: Blessed Thomas of Orvieto, religious – Optional Memorial
- 1 July: Blessed Ferdinand Baccilieri, religious – Optional Memorial
- 4 July: Blessed Ubaldus of Borgo Sansepolcro, priest – Optional Memorial
- 13 July: Saint Clelia Barbieri, virgin – Memorial
- 23 August: Saint Philip Benizi, religious – Feast
- 28 August: Saint Augustine, bishop and Doctor of the Church – Feast
- 31 August: Blessed Andrea of Borgo Sansepolcro, religious – Optional Memorial
- 1 September: Blessed Giovanna of Firenze, virgin – Optional Memorial (Memorial for the Nuns)
- 5 September: Blessed Maria Maddalena Starace, virgin – Optional Memorial
- 6 September: Blessed Bonaventure of Forlì, priest – Memorial
- 15 September: Our Lady of Sorrows, Principal Patroness of the Order – Solemnity
- 17 September: Blessed Cecilia Eusepi, virgin – Optional Memorial
- 22 September: Dedication of the Basilica of Monte Senario – Memorial
- 3 October: Blessed María Guadalupe Ricart Olmos, virgin and martyr – Optional Memorial
- 25 October: Blessed Giovannangelo Porro – Memorial
- 16 November: All of Saints of the Order – Feast
- 17 November: Commemoration of all the Faithful Departed of the Order
- 10 December: Blessed Jerome of Sant'Angelo in Vado, priest – Optional Memorial
- 15 December: Blessed Bonaventure of Pistoia, priest – Optional Memorial

=== Society of the Divine Word ===
- 15 January: Saint Arnold Janssen, priest and founder – Solemnity
- 29 January: Saint Joseph Freinademetz, priest – Memorial
- 25 March: Annunciation of the Lord, Titular Feast of the Society – Solemnity
- Saturday following the second Sunday after Pentecost: Immaculate Heart of Mary – Feast
- 12 June: Blesseds Louis Mzyk, Stanislaus Kubista and Aloysius Liguda, priests and Gregory Frackowak, religious, martyrs – Optional Memorial
- 8 September: Birth of the Blessed Virgin Mary, Patroness of the Society – Solemnity
- 28 November: Blessed Maria Helena Stollenwerk – Optional Memorial

=== Sovereign Military Order of Malta ===
SourceL

- 20 February: Dedication of the Co-cathedral of Saint John the Baptist, Principal Church of the Order - Feast
- 22 March: Blessed Clemens August Cardinal von Galen - Memorial
- 1 April: Saint Nonius Alvares Pereira, prior - Memorial
- 18 May: Blessed Gerard Mecatti of Villamagna - Memorial
- 23 May: Blessed Vilmos Apor, bishop and martyr - Memorial
- 28 May: Saint Ubaldesca, virgin - Memorial
- 12 June: Saint Fleur of Beaulieu, virgin - Memorial
- 19 June: Blessed Gerland - Memorial
- 24 June: Birth of Saint John the Baptist - Solemnity
- 1 July: Saint Nicasius, martyr - Memorial
- 8 July: Blessed Adrian Fortescue, martyr - Memorial
- 12 July: Blessed David Gunston, martyr - Memorial
- 14 July: Saint Toscana, religious - Memorial
- 29 August: Beheading of St John the Baptist - Feast
- 30 August: Blessed Alfredo Ildefonso Schuster, bishop - Memorial
- 8 September: Our Lady of Philermos - Feast
- 23 September: Saints Zechariah and Elizabeth, parents of Saint John the Baptist - Memorial
- 5 October: Blessed Peter Pattarini of Imola, prior - Memorial
- 8 October: Saint Hugh, religious - Memorial
- 11 October: Blessed John XXIII, pope - Memorial
- 13 October: Blessed Fra’ Gerard, founder - Feast
- 21 October: Blessed Karl of Austria - Memorial
- 19 November: All Saints of Our Order - Memorial
- 2 December: Our Lady of Liesse, Cause of Our Joy - Memorial

=== Theatines ===
- 4 January: Saint Giuseppe Maria Tomasi, priest – Feast
- 8 May: Our Lady, Immaculate Mother – Feast
- 16 June: Blessed Paolo Burali, bishop – Memorial
- 7 August: Saint Cajetan, priest and founder – Solemnity
- 14 September: Exaltation of the Holy Cross – Solemnity
- 10 November: Saint Andrew Avellino, priest – Feast
- 12 December: Blessed John Marinonio, priest – Memorial

=== Trinitarians ===
- 7 January: Saint Juan de Ribera, bishop – Memorial
- 22 January: Saint Vincenzo Pallotti, priest – Memorial
- 28 January: Saint Agnes Romana, virgin and martyr, Principal Patroness of the Order – Feast
- 4 February: Blessed Elisabetta Canori Mora – Memorial
- 14 February: Saint Juan Bautista de la Concepción, priest – Feast
- 24 March: Blessed Diego José de Cádiz, priest – Memorial
- 16 April: Saint Benoît-Joseph Labre, religious – Memorial
- 7 May: Translation of the Relics of Saint Jean de Matha – Optional Memorial
- 11 May: Blessed Domingo Iturrate Zubero del Santísimo Sacramento, priest – Memorial
- Sunday following Pentecost: Most Holy Trinity, Titular of the Order – Solemnity
- 8 June: Saint Miquel Argemir i Mitjà dels Sants, priest – Feast
- 9 June: Blessed Anna Maria Giannetti Taigi – Memorial
- 12 August: Blessed Innocentius XI, pope – Memorial
- 25 August: Saint Louis IX of France – Memorial
- 12 September: Most Holy Name of the Blessed Virgin Mary – Memorial
- 24 September: Blessed Marcos Criado Guelamo, priest and martyr – Memorial
- 28 September: Saint Simón de Rojas, priest – Memorial
- 8 October: Our Lady of Good Remedy, Patroness of the Order – Solemnity
- 23 October: Most Holy Redeemer – Feast
- 4 November: Saint Félix de Valois, priest and co-founder – Memorial
- 13 November: All the Saints of the Order of the Most Holy Trinity – Feast
- 14 November: Commemoration of all the Faithful Departed of the Order
- 17 December: Saint Jean de Matha, priest and founder – Solemnity

=== Vincentian Family ===
Includes the Congregation of the Mission and the Daughters of Charity of Saint Vincent de Paul

- 4 January: Saint Elizabeth Anne Seton, religious – Memorial
- 7 January: Blessed Lindalva Justo de Oliveira, virgin and martyr – Optional Memorial
- 25 January: The Conversion of Saint Paul, anniversary of the Institution of the Congregation of Missions – Feast
- 1 February: Blesseds Marie-Anne Vaillot and Otilia Baumgarten, virgins and martyrs – Optional Memorial
- 3 February: Blessed Josephine Nicoli, virgin – Optional Memorial
- 7 February: Blessed Rosalia Rendu, virgin – Optional Memorial
- 26 April: Translation of the Relics of Saint Vincent de Paul – Optional Memorial
- 9 May: Saint Louise de Marillac, religious and cofounder – Solemnity
- 23 May: Saint Joanna Antide Thouret, virgin – Optional Memorial
- 30 May: Blessed Martha Mary Wiecka, virgin – Optional Memorial
- 26 June: Blessed Mary Magdalene Fontaine and companions, virgins and martyrs – Optional Memorial
- 9 July: Saints Francis Regis Clet, Augustine Zhao Rong, priests and companions, martyrs – Memorial
- 28 July: Saint Peter Chrysologus, bishop and Doctor of the Church – Optional Memorial
- 30 July: Saint Justin de Jacobis, bishop – Memorial
- 30 August: Blessed Ghebre Michael, priest and martyr —Memorial
- 2 September: Blesseds Louis Joseph François and companions, priests and martyrs – Optional Memorial
- 9 September: Blessed Frederic Ozanam – Optional Memorial
- 11 September: Saint John Gabriel Perboyre, priest and martyr – Memorial
- 27 September: Saint Vincent de Paul, priest and founder – Solemnity
- Sunday before the Solemnity of All Saints: Dedication of the Church (if date is unknown) – Solemnity
- 6 November: Blesseds Fortunata Velasco Tobar, priest, Melchora Adoración Cortés Bueno, José Martínez Pérez, virgins and companions, martyrs – Optional Memorial
- 27 November: Our Lady of the Miraculous Medal – Feast
- 28 November: Saint Catherine Labouré, virgin – Memorial
- 10 December: Blessed Marco Antonio Durando, priest – Optional Memorial

== See also ==
- General Roman Calendar
- National calendars of the Roman Rite
- Personal jurisdiction calendars of the Roman Rite
