= Capuchin Church =

Capuchin Church my stand for:

- Capuchin Church, Vienna
- Capuchin Church (Maribor)
- Church and Convent of Capuchins
