= Cajazeiras =

Coordinates: 6.89°S 38.5619°W

- Municipality
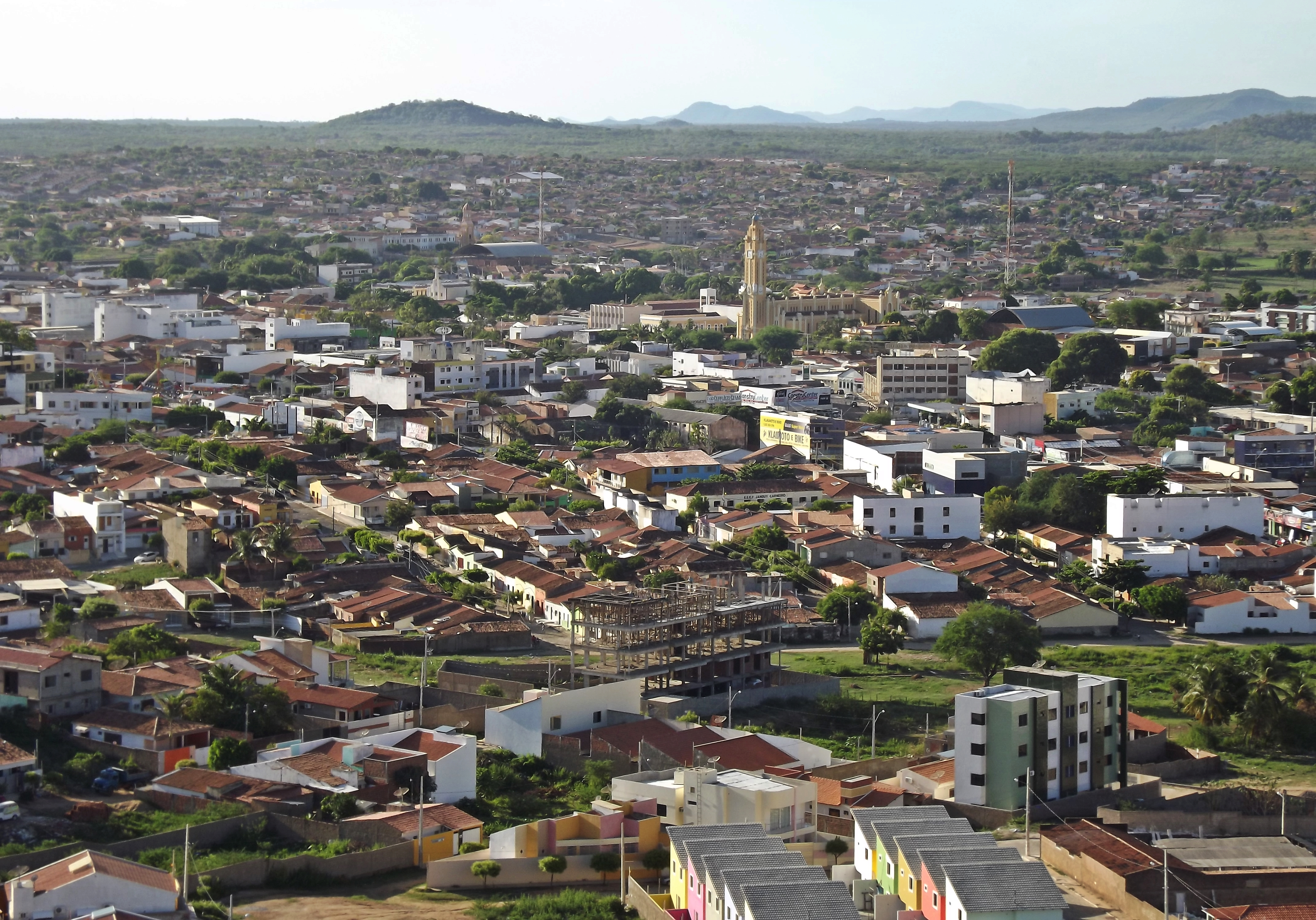

- Flag Coat of arms
- Interactive map of Cajazeiras
- Country: Brazil
- Region: Northeast
- State: Paraíba

Area
  - Total: 218.495 sq mi (565.899 km^{2})

Population (2020)
  - Total: 62,289
- Time zone: UTC−3 (BRT)

Cajazeiras is a municipality in the state of Paraíba in the Northeast Region of Brazil.

== History ==
The first grantees of the lands where the city of Cajazeiras now stands were Francisco Gomes Brito and José Rodrigues da Fonseca, who received the area through a colonial land grant issued by the governor of the Captaincy of Paraíba, Luiz Antônio Lemos Brito, in the 18th century. Thirteen years later, on February 7, 1767, part of these lands was donated to Luiz Gomes de Albuquerque, a native of Pernambuco, who founded the Cajazeiras Farm. The founder later gave the property to his daughter, Ana Francisca de Albuquerque, upon her marriage to Vital de Souza Rolim, a member of a traditional family from Jaguaribe, Ceará. Under their ownership, the area became a large cattle farm. Around 1804, the couple built the Great House of the Farm and the Great Reservoir, which supplied water to the local population and livestock.

From the marriage of Ana and Vital was born Inácio de Sousa Rolim, considered the pioneer in the history of Cajazeiras. He was born at Sítio Serrote on August 22, 1800, and ordained a priest at the Episcopal Palace of Olinda, Pernambuco, in September 1825. Nearly four years later, in 1829, Priest Rolim founded the Escolinha de Serraria, a small school directly linked to the origins of the town. The school began to grow in 1833, attracting students from nearby and distant regions. In 1836, Ana de Albuquerque built a chapel dedicated to Our Lady of Mercy (Nossa Senhora da Piedade), now the Parish Church of Our Lady of Fatima. The small wooden school was later replaced by a new brick building.

In 1843, Priest Rolim returned to his family’s lands and founded a Salesian school, today known as Our Lady of Lourdes School, which drew many students, including notable figures such as Cícero Romão Batista from Crato, Ceará. The growing number of students and families settling around the school led to the formation of a settlement that would become the town of Cajazeiras, named after the original farm founded by Luiz Gomes de Albuquerque, where many cajazeira trees (Spondias lutea) grew—trees that produce the fruit known as cashew.

On August 29, 1859, by Provincial Law 5, Cajazeiras became a district under the municipality of Sousa. Later, on November 23, 1863, through Provincial Law 92, sanctioned by Governor Francisco de Araújo Lima, the district was elevated to the category of village and separated from Sousa, forming a new municipality in what was then the Province of Paraíba do Norte. The municipal government was officially installed on June 20, 1864, with Priest José Tomaz de Albuquerque, parish vicar, serving as the first president of the local chamber. On July 10, 1876, by Provincial Law 616, the village was elevated to the status of city. In 1885, Cajazeiras lost part of its territory when the district of São José de Piranhas was separated to form a new municipality.

Later, on February 6, 1914, Pope Pius X, through the papal bull Maius Catholicae Religionis Incrementum, created the Diocese of Cajazeiras, detached from the Diocese of Paraíba, which was simultaneously elevated to an archdiocese. The Church of Our Lady of Mercy became the cathedral of the new diocese, whose first bishop, Moisés Sizenando Coelho, took office on June 29, 1915, remaining until 1932, when he was transferred to Archdiocese of Paraíba, in João Pessoa. Also in 1915, during one of the most severe droughts in the history of Northeastern Brazil, the expansion works of the Açude Grande began and were completed on November 16, 1916. In the 1920s, the railroad arrived in 1922 and electricity was introduced in 1923. The first municipal election was held on September 9, 1935, electing Joaquim Gonçalves de Matos Rolim as mayor, who took office on December 14, 1935.

On January 31, 1937, next to the episcopal palace, Bishop Dom João da Mata laid the cornerstone for the construction of a new cathedral, completed only in 1959 after several interruptions due to lack of funds. Even before its completion, in 1957, the episcopal see was transferred to the new cathedral, while the old church became the seat of the newly established Parish of Our Lady of Fatima.

Earlier, in 1948, August 22, the birth date of Father Rolim, was declared a municipal holiday. In 1954, the original Rolim family farm was demolished to make way for the Cajazeiras Tennis Club, an act that sparked local protests. In the following decade, state laws detached the districts of Cachoeira dos Índios and Bom Jesus, both of which became independent municipalities. Later, in 1978, the district of Catolé dos Gonçalves was created (though never installed), followed by the district of Divinópolis in 1979.

In 2003, the Institute of Historical and Artistic Heritage of the State of Paraíba (IPHAEP) designated the Historic Center of Cajazeiras, which was officially recognized by State Decree No. 25.140 on June 28, 2004. Twelve properties were listed as part of the city’s historical and cultural heritage, preserving Cajazeiras’s legacy as “the land that taught Paraíba to read.”

== Transportation ==
The city is served by Pedro Vieira Moreira Airport.

== See also ==
- List of municipalities in Paraíba
