= Personal jurisdiction calendars of the Roman Rite =

Personal jurisdiction calendars of the Roman Rite of the Catholic Church are lists of saints' feast days and other liturgical celebrations, organized by calendar date, that apply to members of individual personal ordinariates and personal prelatures that worship according to the Roman Rite of the Latin Church. Such calendars are "particular calendars" that build off of the General Roman Calendar.

== Personal Ordinariates ==
=== Chair of St. Peter ===
In addition to the national calendar of the United States, the Personal Ordinariate of the Chair of Saint Peter contains a number of saints from the British Isles in its liturgical calendar; this calendar now supplants the former one used by Anglican Use Catholics in the United States prior to 2015.

Change	Month	Day	Title of the liturgy	Rank	Color
Added	January	12	Saint Benedict Biscop, Abbot	Optional Memorial	White
Added	February	4	Saint Gilbert of Sempringham, Religious	Optional Memorial	White
Elevated (Note: This entry is listed on the General Roman Calendar but with the lower rank of Feast.)	February	22	Chair of Saint Peter the Apostle	Solemnity	White
Added	March	1	Saint David, Bishop	Optional Memorial	White
Elevated (Note: This entry is listed on the General Roman Calendar but with the lower rank of Optional Memorial.)	April	23	Saint George, Martyr	Memorial	Red
Transferred (Note: This entry is listed under a different date on the General Roman Calendar (April 23) but is transferred here in this calendar.)	April	24	Saint Adalbert, Bishop and Martyr	Optional Memorial	Red
Added	May	4	The English Martyrs	Memorial	Red
Added	May	19	Saints Dunstan, Ethelwold, and Oswald, Bishops	Optional Memorial	White
Added	June	9	Saint Columba, Abbot	Optional Memorial	White
Added	June	16	Saint Richard of Chichester, Bishop	Optional Memorial	White
Added	June	20	Saint Alban, protomartyr of England	Optional Memorial	White
Elevated (Note: This entry is listed on the General Roman Calendar but with the lower rank of Optional Memorial.)	June	22	Saints John Fisher, Bishop, and Thomas More, Martyrs	Memorial	Red
Transferred (Note: This entry is listed under a different date on the General Roman Calendar (June 22) but is transferred here in this calendar.)	June	23	Paulinus of Nola, Bishop	Optional Memorial	White
Added	June	23	Saints Hilda, Etheldreda, and Mildred, and All Holy Nuns	Optional Memorial	White
Added	July	9	Our Lady of the Atonement	Optional Memorial	White
Added	August	30	Saints Margaret Clitherow, Anne Line, and Margaret Ward, Martyrs	Optional Memorial	Red
Added	August	31	Saint Aidan, Bishop, and the Saints of Lindisfarne	Optional Memorial	White
Added	September	4	Saint Cuthbert, Bishop	Optional Memorial	White
Added	September	19	Saint Theodore of Canterbury, Bishop	Optional Memorial	White
Added	September	19	Saint Adrian, Abbot	Optional Memorial	White
Added	September	24	Our Lady of Walsingham, Patroness of the Ordinariate	Feast	White
Transferred (Note: This entry is listed under a different date on the General Roman Calendar (October 9) but is transferred here in this calendar.)	October	8	Saint Denis and Companions, Martyrs	Optional Memorial	Red
Transferred (Note: This entry is listed under a different date on the General Roman Calendar (October 9) but is transferred here in this calendar.)	October	8	Saint John Leonardi, Priest	Optional Memorial	White
Added	October	9	Saint John Henry Newman, Priest	Optional Memorial	White
Added	October	12	Saint Wilfrid	Optional Memorial	White
Added	October	13	Saint Edward the Confessor	Optional Memorial	White
Added	November	20	Saint Edmund, Martyr	Optional Memorial	Red

== See also ==
- General Roman Calendar
- National calendars of the Roman Rite
- Institutional and societal calendars of the Roman Rite
