= Cajazeiras Airport =

Pedro Vieira Moreira Airport Aeroporto Pedro Vieira Moreira
- IATA: CJZ; ICAO: SJZA; LID: PB0004

Summary
- Airport type: Public
- Serves: Cajazeiras
- Time zone: BRT (UTC−03:00)
- Elevation AMSL: 335 m (1,099 ft)
- Coordinates: 06°52′58″S 038°36′57″W

Map
- Location in Brazil

Runways
Direction	Length		Surface
Direction	m	ft	Surface
12/30	1,600	5,249	Asphalt
- Sources: ANAC, DECEA

Pedro Vieira Moreira Airport (IATA: CJZ, ICAO: SJZA), is the airport serving Cajazeiras, Brazil.

== Airlines and destinations ==
Airlines	Destinations
Azul Conecta	Recife

== Access ==
The airport is located 9 km (6 mi) from downtown Cajazeiras.

== See also ==
- List of airports in Brazil
