= Rochefort martyrs =

French Roman Catholic priests and religious martyred on prison ships in Rochefort

The Rochefort martyrs were 64 of the 829 Catholic clergymen deported in the course of persecutions of opposition clergymen after the French Revolution. They were held in prison ships off Rochefort in inhumane conditions, and at least 505 of them died. The Rochefort martyrs were beatified by Pope John Paul II in 1995.

== History ==
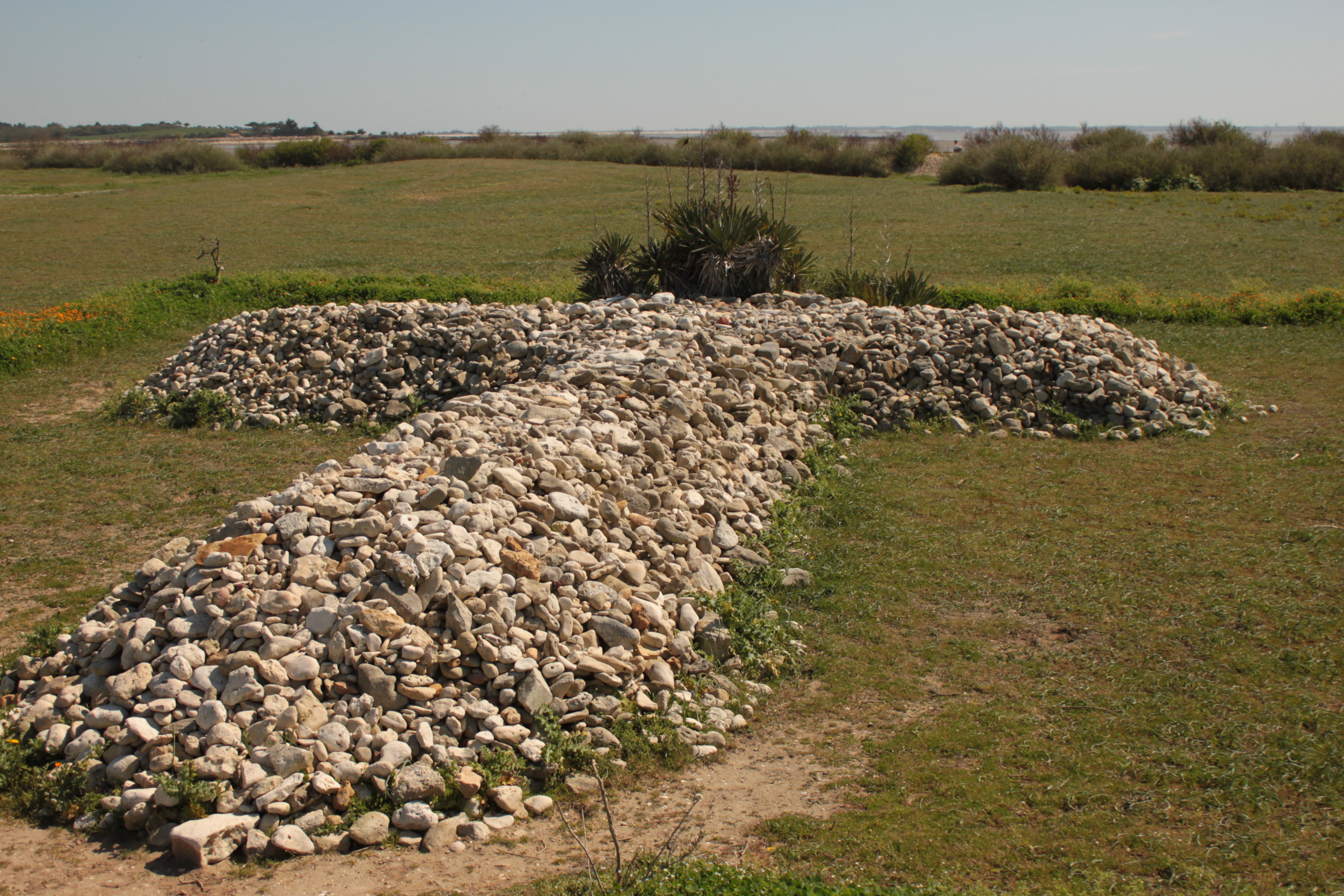
Commemorative cross on the Île Madame

As part of the increasingly-radicalised anti-Christian policy of the French Revolution, Decree No. 906 was issued on October 21, 1793, concerning the deportation of clergy to West Africa. All priests who had refused or revoked the oath to the Civil Constitution of the Clergy (the so-called réfractaires) or who had been denounced for not supporting the revolution were to be deported. Priests who had not yet emigrated or were unable or unwilling to hide were arrested and transported in groups to Nantes, Bordeaux, or Rochefort on horse-drawn carts between March and July 1794 under military or police guard, along with other exiles. Of the total of 2412 deported clergy, 829 arrived at Rochefort and were interned on prison ships, mainly the Deux-Associés and the Washington; they were former slave ships. The first prisoners were taken on April 11, 1794, on the Deux-Associés, which was actually intended to transport 40 slaves and at times housed up to 400 captive priests. The Washington was added in mid-June.

A departure for Africa was never seriously considered, especially since the ships could not have survived the journey, and leaving French ports would not have been possible anyway because of the British naval blockade.

The priests were kept on the overcrowded ships in agonizing confinement under the strictest guard, with insufficient food and sanitary conditions. There was a strict ban on praying and speaking Latin. In August, after conditions on board had become intolerable, the sick were ordered to disembark on Citoyenne Island (now Île Madame, part of Port-des-Barques), where a makeshift tent hospital was prepared. Of 83 prisoners brought to the island from August 18 to 20, 1794, 36 died within hours of their arrival. At the end of October, due to the harsh weather conditions, the field hospital was closed after many tents were blown away by the wind, and all prisoners had to spend the winter back on the ships.

Due to changes in the political situation in France, treatment by the guards was somewhat milder from late fall 1794, and the priests were allowed to leave the ships in January 1795; the survivors were forced to march in two groups to Saintes, where they were released. In all, at least 505 of the 829 priests died of typhus or debilitation, mainly between June and September 1794. About half were buried on the island of Aix near Fouras, 254 on Citoyenne/Madame, where today a recumbent cross formed of pebbles commemorates the martyrs.

== Reception ==
In 1796 and 1803, survivors published a total of three reports. In 1806, survivor Pierre-Grégoire Labiche de Reignefort had a "very detailed account of the things suffered for the sake of religion by the priests detained on board the ships Les Deux Associés and Le Washington in 1794 and 1795 for refusal to take an oath in the harbor of the island of Aix and its surroundings," which contains an appeal written by his group of prisoners and illustrates the spirit and hope for the future of this part of the victims. According to this testimony, the survivors promised to bear their suffering in surrender to the will of God with serenity of mind, to maintain discretion about what they had experienced and not to answer any questions, in particular to maintain silence about any weaknesses and faults of fellow prisoners, and after their release to harbor no regrets about material losses and no resentment and to renounce future political activity.

In the interest of national reconciliation, Emperor Napoleon Bonaparte suppressed any public discussion of the subject, so that the fate of the priests was forgotten over the decades. Only in the immediate vicinity of the affected villages did the memory of the events remain common knowledge. In 1863, the new parish priest of Saint-Nazaire-sur-Charente near Rochefort, Isidore Manseau, learned of the events and drew attention to them in 1886 with a two-volume publication. The Martyrology of the French Revolution, published in 1821 during the royalist restoration under Louis XVIII by the former Dominican Aimé Guillon de Montléon, compared the victims of religious persecution in revolutionary France to the early Christian martyrs. It contained a detailed chapter on the fate of the Rochefort ship's occupants.

== Veneration ==
In 1910, the tradition of an annual pilgrimage to Port-des-Barques in August began; it continues to this day. At the same time, Bishop Jean-Auguste-François-Eutrope Eyssautier of La Rochelle launched the preliminary information for a beatification process, for which Pierre Lemonnier (1848-1924) compiled the material published in 1916 and 1917 (including 590 short biographies). In view of the high demands made in Rome for beatification, the process had to be reopened after Lemonnier's death by his successor Léandre Poivert. He benefited from the fact that the historian Jacques Hérissay (1882-1969) had meanwhile published Les pontons de Rochefort (1792-1795), the book awarded a prize from the Académie Française in 1925. The beatification process which took place from 1932 to 1936 could concentrate on 102 historically well-documented names.

Nonetheless, proof of martyrdom according to valid canonical requirements was not easy to prove. It was not until 1989 that the theologian and historian Yves Blomme (* 1948) took another look at the case and in 1992 presented a new Positio super Martyrio, which limited the trial to those 64 priests whose identity and venerability could be sufficiently determined and secured. The process led to the beatification of Jean-Baptiste Souzy, 1734-1794, and his 63 companions as martyrs by Pope John Paul II on October 1, 1995.

== The beati in alphabetical order ==
- Adam, Louis-Armand-Joseph (b. 19 December 1741 in Rouen; † 13 July 1794), Franciscan friar in Rouen (Deux-Associés).
- Ancel, Charles-Antoine-Nicolas (b. 11 October 1763 in Rouen; † 29 July 1794), Eudist (member of the Congregation of Jesus and Mary) and seminary teacher in Lisieux (Deux-Associés)
- Auriel-Constant, Antoine (b. 19 April 1764 at Sainte-Mondane; † 16 June 1794), chaplain at Calviac-en-Périgord and parish priest at Sainte-Mondane, diocese of Cahors (Deux-Associés)
- Banassat, Antoine (b. 20 May 1729 at Guéret; † 18 August 1794), parish priest of Saint-Fiel (where a street is named after him) and deputy to the Estates-General from 1789 to 30 September 1791 (Deux-Associés)
- Beguignot, Claude (b. 19 September 1736 at Langres; † 16 July 1794), Carthusian at Le Petit-Quevilly (Deux Associés)
- Bourdon, Jean, Father Protais (b. 3 April 1747 at Sées; † 23 August 1794), Capuchin friar at Sotteville-lès-Rouen (Deux Associés)
- Brigeat (de) Lambert, Scipion-Jérôme (b. 9 June 1733 at Ligny-en-Barrois; † 4 September 1794), canon and dean of the canons at Avranches, previously vicar general (Washington)
- Brulard, Michel-Louis (b. June 11, 1758, Chartres; † July 25, 1794), lay brother of the Discalced Carmelites at Charenton-le-Pont (Deux-Associés)
- Brunel, Gervais-Protais (b. 18 June 1744 at Magnières, département of Meurthe-et-Moselle; † 20 August 1794), Trappist, prior of the monastery of La Trappe (of which Augustin de Lestrange was novice master) (Deux Associés)
- Charles, Paul-Jean, Father Paul (b. 29 September 1743 at Millery, Côte-d'Or department; † 25 August 1794), Trappist, prior of Sept-Fons monastery (Deux-Associés)
- Collas du Bignon, Charles-René (b. 25 August 1743 at Mayenne; † 3 June 1794), Sulpician, seminary director at Bourges (Deux-Associés, island of Aix)
- Cordier, Jean-Nicolas (b. 3 December 1710 at Saint-André-en-Barrois, Meuse department; † 30 September 1794), Jesuit (until 1773), priest in the Diocese of Verdun (Washington)
- De Bruxelles, Jean-Baptiste (b. Sept. 12, 1734, Saint-Léonard-de-Noblat; July 18, 1794), canon in his birthplace (Deux Associés)
- Desgardins, Augustin-Joseph, Frater Élie (b. 21 December 1750 at Hénin-Liétard; † 6 July 1794), Trappist from Sept-Fons (Deux Associés)
- Dumonet, Claude (b. 2 February 1747 at Prissé; † 13 September 1794), priest and high school teacher at Mâcon (Washington)
- Dumontet de Cardaillac, Florent (b. Feb. 8, 1749, at Saint-Méard; † Sept. 5, 1794), confessor to Louis XVIII, later king, and Maria Josepha of Savoy, countess of Provence, then vicar general of Castres Diocese (Deux-Associés)
- Dupas, Jacques-Morelle (* 10 November 1754 in Ruffec (Charente); 21 June 1794), chaplain in Ruffec (Deux-Associés)
- Duverneuil, Jean-Baptiste, Father Léonard (b. c. 1737 at Limoges; † 1 July 1794), monastic friar of the Discalced Carmelites at Angoulême (Deux-Associés)
- Favergne (or: Faverge), Pierre-Sulpice-Christophe, Brother Roger (b. 25 July 1745 in Orléans; † 12 September 1794), member of the Brothers of the Christian Schools, school director in Moulins (Deux-Associés)
- François, François, Father Sébastien (b. 17 January 1749 in Nancy; † 10 August 1794), Capuchin friar (Deux-Associés)
- Gabilhaud, Pierre (b. July 26, 1747, at Pont-Saint-Martin, now Saint-Bonnet-de-Bellac and Saint-Sornin-la-Marche; † August 13, 1794), parish priest of Saint-Christophe (Creuse) (Deux-Associés)
- Gagnot, Jacques, Brother Hubert de Saint-Claude (b. 9 February 1753 at Frolois near Nancy; † 10 September 1794), monastic brother of the Discalced Carmelites at Nancy (Deux-Associés)
- Guillaume, Jean-Baptiste, Brother Uldaric (b. Feb. 1, 1755, at Fraisans; † Aug. 27, 1794), member of the Brothers of the Christian Schools at Nancy (Deux-Associés)
- Hanus (de Jumécourt), Charles-Arnould (b. 18 October 1723 at Nancy; † 28 August 1794), pastor of Ligny-en-Barrois (Washington)
- Hunot, François (b. 12 February 1753 at Brienon-sur-Armançon; † 6 October 1794), canon at Brienon-sur-Armançon (Washington)
- Hunot, Jean (b. 21 September 1742 at Brienon-sur-Armançon; † 7 October 1794), canon at Brienon-sur-Armançon (Washington)
- Hunot, Sébastien-Loup (b. August 7, 1745, at Brienon-sur-Armançon; † November 17, 1794), canon at Brienon-sur-Armançon (Washington)
- Huppy, Louis-Wulphy (b. 1 April 1767 at Rue (Somme); † 29 August 1794), priest of the bishopric of Limoges (Deux-Associés)
- Imbert, Joseph (b. 15 December 1719 at Marseilles; † 9 June 1794), Jesuit, vicar general at Moulins (Deux-Associés)
- Jarrige de La Morelie de Biars, Barthélemy (* March 18, 1753 in Moutier, Département Haute-Vienne; July 13, 1794), Benedictine of the Abbey of Lézat-sur-Lèze (Deux Associés).
- Jarrige de La Morelie de Breuil, Jean-François (b. 11 January 1752 at Saint-Yrieix-la-Perche; † 31 July 1794), canon at Saint-Yrieix-la-Perche (Deux-Associés)
- Jarrige de La Morelie de Puyredon, Pierre (b. 19 April 1737 in Saint-Yrieix-la-Perche; † 12 August 1794), canon in Saint-Yrieix-la-Perche (Deux-Associés, island of Aix)
- Jouffret de Bonnefont, Claude-Joseph (b. 23 December 1752 at Gannat; † 10 August 1794), Sulpician, seminary director at Autun (Deux Associés)
- Juge de Saint-Martin, Joseph (b. 14 June 1739 in Limoges; † 7 July 1794), Sulpician, canon and seminary rector in Limoges (Deux Associées)
- Labiche de Reignefort, Marcel-Gaucher (b. Nov. 3, 1751, Limoges; † July 26, 1794), member of the Societas Missionariorum at Limoges, brother of Pierre-Grégoire Labiche de Reignefort (1756-1831), survivor and principal reporter (Deux-Associés)
- Laborie Du Vivier, Jean-Baptiste (b. 19 September 1743 in Mâcon; † 27 September 1794), canon of Mâcon Cathedral (Deux-Associés)
- Labrouhe de Laborderie, Pierre-Yrieix (b. May 24, 1756, at Saint-Yrieix-la-Perche; † July 1, 1794), canon at Saint-Yrieix-la-Perche (Deux-Associés)
- Laplace, Claude (b. Nov. 15, 1725, Bourbon-Lancy; † Sept. 14, 1794), priest at Autun and/or Moulins (Deux Associés)
- Laurent de Mascloux, Claude-Barnabé (b. 11 June 1735 in Le Dorat; † 7 September 1794), canon in Le Dorat (Deux-Associés)
- Lebrun, Louis-François (b. April 4, 1744, in Rouen; † Aug. 20, 1794), a Moor from the abbey of Saint-Wandrille (Deux-Associés)
- Le Conte, Noël-Hilaire (b. Oct. 3, 1765, Chartres; † Aug. 17, 1794), priest and church musician at Bourges Cathedral (Deux-Associés)
- Le Groing de la Romagère, Pierre-Joseph (b. 28 June 1752 at Saint-Sauvier, Allier department; † 26 July 1794), vicar general of the Archdiocese of Bourges, brother of Mathias Le Groing de La Romagère (1756-1841), later bishop of Saint-Brieuc and Tréguier, survivor and reporter (Deux-Associés)
- Leymarie de Laroche, Élie (b. 8 January 1758 at Annesse-et-Beaulieu; † 22 August 1794), prior at Coutras, church of Saint-Jean-Baptiste (Deux-Associés)
- Loir, Jean Baptiste Jacques Louis Xavier (b. 11 March 1720 in Besançon; † 9 May 1794), Capuchin friar in Lyon (Deux-Associés)
- Lombardie, Jacques (b. 1 December 1737 in Limoges; † 22 July 1794), parish priest of Saint-Hilaire-Foissac (Deux-Associées)
- Marchand, Michel-Bernard (b. 28 September 1749 in Le Havre; † 15 July 1794), priest in the archdiocese of Rouen (Deux-Associés)
- Marchandon, André-Joseph (b. Aug. 21, 1745, at Bénévent-l'Abbaye; † Sept. 22, 1794), parish priest of Marsac (Creuse) (Deux-Associés)
- Mayaudon, François (b. 4 May 1739 at Terrasson-Lavilledieu; † 11 September 1794), canon and vicar general at Soissons, previously at Saint-Brieuc (Deux-Associés)
- Ménestrel, Jean-Baptiste (b. 5 December 1748 at Serécourt; † 16 August 1794), canon at Remiremont (Washington)
- Mopinot, Jean, frère Léon (b. April 7, 1724, at Rheims; † May 21, 1794), member of the Brothers of the Christian Schools at Moulins (Deux-Associés)
- Noël, Pierre-Michel (b. 23 February 1754 in Pavilly; † 5 August 1794), priest in the archdiocese of Rouen (Deux-Associés)
- Oudinot de la Boissière, François d' (b. 3 September 1746 at Saint-Germain-les-Belles; † 7 September 1794), canon in the Diocese of Limoges (Deux-Associés)
- Papon, Philippe (5 Oct. 1744 at Saint-Pourçain-sur-Sioule; † 17 June 1794), parish priest of Contigny, Allier Department (Deux-Associés)
- Pergaud, Gabriel (b. Oct. 29, 1752, at Saint-Priest-la-Plaine; † July 21, 1794), Augustinian canon at Beaulieu Canonry in Languédias (Deux-Associés)
- Petiniaud de Jourgnac, Raymond (b. 3 January 1747 at Limoges; † 26 June 1794), vicar general of Limoges Diocese (Deux-Associés, island of Aix)
- Rehm, Jean-Georges, Father Thomas (b. April 21, 1752, at Katzenthal; † August 11, 1794), Dominican friar at Sélestat (Deux-Associés)
- René, Georges-Edme (b. 16 November 1748 at Saint-Père (Yonne); † 2 October 1794), canon at Vézelay (Washington)
- Retouret, Jacques (b. Sept. 15, 1746, Limoges; † Aug. 26, 1794), Carmelite at Limoges (Deux-Associés)
- Richard, Claude (b. 19 May 1741 at Lérouville; † 9 August 1794), Benedictine monk at Moyenmoutier (Deux-Associés)
- Savouret, Nicolas (b. Feb. 27, 1733, at Jonvelle; † July 16, 1794), Franciscan friar at Moulins, doctor of theology (Deux-Associés)
- Souzy, Jean-Baptiste (b. March 24, 1732, at La Rochelle; † August 27, 1794), vicar general of La Rochelle Diocese and of the deportees (Deux-Associés)
- Tabouillot, Nicolas (b. 16 February 1745 at Bar-le-Duc; † 23 February 1795), parish priest of Méligny-le-Grand, Meuse department (Washington) (not to be confused with the historian of the same name, 1734-1799)
- Tiersot, Lazare (b. March 29, 1739, Semur-en-Auxois; † Aug. 10, 1794), Carthusian at Beaune (Washington) since 1769
- Vernoy de Montjournal, Jean-Baptiste (* 17 November 1736 in Autun; † 1 June 1794), canon in Moulins (Deux-Associés)

== Secondary Sources ==
- Yves Blomme: Les prêtres déportés sur les pontons de Rochefort. Éditions Bordessoules, Saint-Jean-d’Angély 1994 (with a preface by Jacques David; 2. edition 2005 with a preface by Georges Pontier).
- Klaus Martin Reichenbach: Florilegium Martyrologii Romani. Cologne 2006, Eintrag zum 27. August (online at the ÖHL).
- Aimé Guillon de Montléon: article Rochefort, in: Les Martyrs de la foi pendant la révolution française, ou Martyrologe des pontifes, prêtres, religieux, religieuses, laïcs de l’un et l’autre sexe, qui périrent alors pour la foi. Band 1. Mathiot, Paris 1821, S. 353–376 (Digital copy at the Bibliothèque nationale de France).
