= Luigi Rabatà =

Blessed Luigi Rabatà O. Carm.
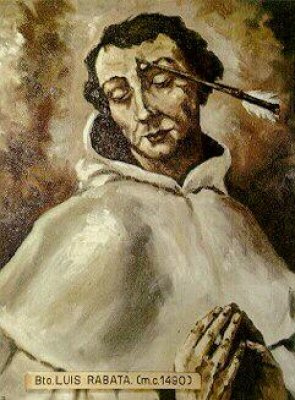

Priest and Martyr
- Born: 1443; Erice, Kingdom of Sicily
- Died: 8 May 1490 (aged 47); Trapani, Kingdom of Sicily
- Venerated in: Roman Catholic Church
- Beatified: 10 December 1841, Saint Peter's Basilica, Vatican City by Pope Gregory XVI
- Feast: 8 May
- Attributes: Carmelite habit; Arrow; Palm
- Patronage: Erice; Trapani

Luigi Rabatà, O.Carm (1443 - 8 May 1490) was an Italian Roman Catholic priest from the Order of Carmelites. He served as prior of his convent of Randazzo until his death which occurred after an attack in which an arrow was shot into his head.

Rabatà's beatification was confirmed on 10 December 1841 after Pope Gregory XVI confirmed that the late priest had a longstanding 'cultus' (or popular devotion) that was enduring.

== Life ==
Luigi Rabatà was born in Erice in 1443.

Rabatà became a member of the Carmelites at the convent of the Annunziata sometime in his adolescence and was later ordained as a priest before being appointed as the prior of the convent of Randazzo. He distinguished himself for giving alms to the poor and was known for his penances.

In 1490 an attacker - said to be Antonio Catalucci - struck him in the head with an arrow; the monk forgave his attacker and refused to mention his name for fear the individual in question would receive a harsh punishment. The reason for the attack was that Rabatà had denounced the extravagant dress of a local lord (said to be Catalucci's brother or father). He died after several months of great pain following this attack. His remains were housed under the main altar of the church at the convent in Trapani in 1640 while some of his relics were relocated to Erice in 1617. His remains were then transferred to an urn under the altar of the Assumption in the Basilica di Santa Maria on 13 August 1913.

== Beatification ==
Processes for his beatification opened in Randazzo in 1533 and then other processes followed in 1573 while the title of Servant of God was bestowed upon him under Pope Clement VII in 1533 with the commencement of the cause.

Rabatà received formal beatification from Pope Gregory XVI on 10 December 1841 following official papal confirmation that the late Carmelite priest had a longstanding 'cultus' (or popular devotion) that proved to be enduring.
