= Julian-Nicolas Rèche =

French Catholic Educator

Blessed Julian-Nicolas Rèche F.S.C.
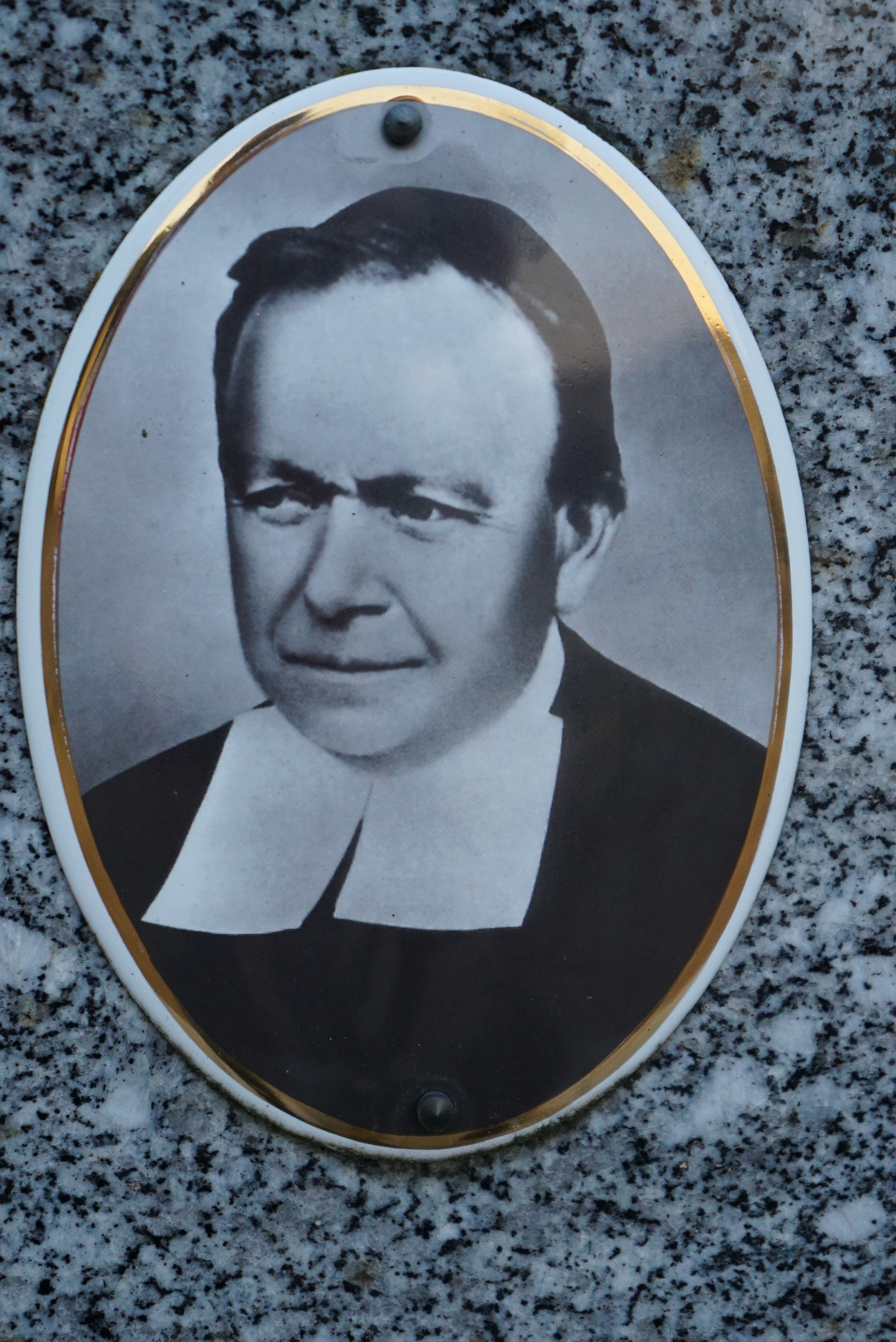

Religious
- Born: 2 September 1838; Landroff, Moselle, July Monarchy
- Died: 23 October 1890 (aged 52); Rheims, Marne, French Third Republic
- Venerated in: Roman Catholic Church
- Beatified: 1 November 1987, Saint Peter's Square, Vatican City by Pope John Paul II
- Feast: 23 October
- Attributes: De La Sallian habit
- Patronage: Educators

Julian-Nicolas Rèche (2 September 1838 – 23 October 1890) was a French Roman Catholic religious of the Institute of the Brothers of the Christian Schools; he assumed the religious name of "Arnould" upon his profession in the congregation and became a noted educator.

His childhood became characterized as one of great faith though dwindled towards a more secular path as he became an adult. His aunt's intervention prompted him to reevaluate his life, leading him to the De La Salle Brothers, whom he later joined and devoted his life to. He became a well-known educator and served in houses of the order until his death.

Rèche's beatification - that Pope John Paul II approved and presided over - was celebrated in Saint Peter's Square on 1 November 1987.

== Life ==
Julian-Nicolas Rèche was born in France on 2 September 1838 as the eldest of nine children to Claude Rèche and Anne Clausset - poor in wealth but strong in faith. His father was a devout shoemaker and his mother was prone to fits of depression due to their economic situation - his mother died in his childhood due to poor health. He recited rosaries each night as a child.

His time at school became noted for his ardent commitment to his religious education. He was considered the sole student in his catechism class that was serious about the subject. He also began to teach it in turn to children in his town. Towards the end of his adolescence he moved to Charleville and began to drift towards a more secular life. He started to work as a coachman for a rich client and as a mule driver (1859–62) for a contractor who was in the middle of building a local church; fellow workers knew him best for his self-discipline.

Rèche's aunt - who lived not too far from him at this time - convinced her nephew to make serious life changes and he began to attend evening classes of the De La Salle Brothers. This prompted him to return to an active life geared towards the religious and he soon petitioned the congregation to accept him as a member. He joined them in 1862 upon commencing his novitiate on 13 November and he assumed both the habit and new religious name of "Arnould" on the following 23 December. Rèche made his profession in 1863 though made his final vows in 1871. He earned a master's degree with honors on 24 September 1868 in Paris.

He worked as a medic in the Franco-Prussian War and treated wounded soldiers in the trenches. This contributed to him being awarded the Bronze Cross for his efforts. Rèche taught for over a decade at a boarding school of the order in Rheims along the Rue de Venise and was noted for being mediocre in classroom topics such as mathematics and agriculture but outstanding in topics related to doctrine and theological studies. He served as a teacher until 1877 when he was appointed as a novice director at Thillois. He also served as the director general of a house in Rheims from March 1890 until his death not long after.

In 1889 he suffered from an acute and persistent cough and later contracted pleurisy.

Rèche died during the night of 23 October 1890 due to a cerebral hemorrhage. He was buried in Rheims though later re-interred while his previous grave became known for being the site of miraculous healings.

== Beatification ==
The beatification process commenced in Rheims in an informative process that opened in 1938 though stalled due to World War II and managed to conclude its business in 1962. Theologians collected his writings and confirmed the latter were orthodox in nature on 21 December 1968. An apostolic process that would have otherwise taken place was waived for this particular cause.

Rèche became titled as a Servant of God on 4 May 1981 after the Congregation for the Causes of Saints declared "nihil obstat" ('nothing against') to the cause. Conferral of the aforementioned title is the first official stage in the proceedings for sainthood.

The C.C.S. validated the informative process in Rome on 5 February 1982 and took charge of the Positio in 1984. Consulting theologians to the C.C.S. approved the cause on 13 February 1986 while the latter themselves did likewise on 20 May 1986. He was proclaimed to be Venerable on 5 June 1986 after Pope John Paul II confirmed that the late religious had indeed lived a life of heroic virtue.

The miracle needed for him to be beatified was investigated in France and was validated in Rome on 11 November 1983. The medical board approved its merits on 10 July 1986 while the theologians consulting the board agreed with their verdict on 7 November 1986; the C.C.S. did likewise on 20 January 1987. The pope approved the miracle - and thus the beatification - on 26 January 1987.

John Paul II beatified Rèche on 1 November 1987.

The current postulator that is assigned to the cause is Rodolfo Cosimo Meoli.
