= Ökumenisches Heiligenlexikon =

The Ökumenische Heiligenlexikon (ÖHL) or Ecumenical Lexicon of Saints is an independent, ecumenical, private internet project administered by Protestant pastor Joachim Schäfer. It aims to provide information on the lives of saints.

== Lexicon ==
The lexicon is the largest and most comprehensive online repository of information on saints and other people considered blessed or holy. The basis of the collection are sources that are generally accessible, often taken from Wikipedia or other online sources.

== Criticism ==
Numerous articles in the lexicon have been proven to be unreliable and too uncritical. Volunteer editors ignored well-researched articles on the lives of medieval saints. Reviewers concluded that due to a lack of contextualization and depth of research, the Heiligenlexikon is not a reliable reference.
