= Feast of the Most Holy Redeemer =

Catholic liturgical feast

The Feast of the Most Holy Redeemer is a Catholic liturgical feast. It is celebrated in Venice as the Festa del Redentore. It is also celebrated by the Redemptorists and was celebrated in the City of Rome.

The feast is found only in the special calendar of some dioceses and religious orders, and is celebrated with proper Mass and Office either on the third Sunday of July or on 23 October. In Venice this feast has been observed for more than three centuries with great solemnity. Gaetano Moroni in his "Dizionario" gives some interesting data concerning the origin of this feast. In 1576 a plague broke out in Venice which in a few days carried off thousands of victims. To avert this scourge the Venetian Senate vowed to erect a splendid temple to the Redeemer of mankind, and to offer therein each year on the third Sunday of July public and solemn services of thanksgiving. Scarcely had the plague ceased when they began to fulfil their vow. The church was designed by the famous Andrea Palladio, and the corner-stone was laid by the Patriarch Trevisan on 3 May, 1577. The celebrated painters Paolo Veronese and Jacopo Tintoretto decorated the interior. The church was consecrated in 1592, and, at the urgent solicitations of Pope Gregory XIII, placed in charge of the Capuchin Fathers.

By concession of Pope Benedict XIV, dated 8 March, 1749, the Congregation of the Most Holy Redeemer solemnizes this feast as a double of the first class with an octave on the third Sunday of July. The same congregation also keeps the feast as a greater double on 23 October and 25 February, and has, besides, the privilege of reciting once a month the votive office of the Most Holy Redeemer. In Rome also Pope Pius VIII introduced the feast and by a Decree of 8 May, 1830, the Sacred Congregation of Rites assigned it to 23 October. The characteristics of the Mass and Office are joy and gratitude for the ineffable graces and benefits of the Redemption. This appears especially from the Introit Gaudens gaudebo, from the antiphons of Lauds Cantate Domino, from the Epistle of the Mass, taken from the chapter 1 of the Epistle to the Ephesians Blessed be the God and Father of our Lord Jesus Christ, Who hath blessed us with spiritual blessings . . . in Christ. For this reason white is the colour of the vestments, and not red, as in the Mass of the Passion.
