= Our Lady of Mercy =

Our Lady of Mercy or Our Mother of Mercy is an epithet for Mary, mother of Jesus, in her role as Virgin of Mercy.

Several religious institutions bear this name, including:

- Mercedarian Order
- Basilica of Our Lady of Mercy (Yarumal)
- Basilica of Our Mother of Mercy, Slovenia
- Cotonou Cathedral, Benin
- Church of Our Lady the Merciful, Russia
- Our Lady of Pellevoisin, France
- Santa Maria della Misericordia, Macerata
- Sisters of Charity of Our Lady of Mercy
- Congregation of the Sisters of Our Lady of Mercy
