= Giovanna Scopelli =

Blessed Giovanna Scopelli O. Carm.
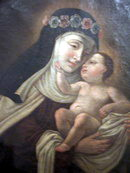

Religious
- Born: 1428; Reggio Emilia, Duchy of Reggio
- Died: 9 July 1491 (aged 63); Reggio Emilia, Duchy of Modena and Reggio
- Venerated in: Roman Catholic Church
- Beatified: 24 August 1771, Saint Peter's Basilica, Papal States by Pope Clement XIV
- Feast: 9 July
- Attributes: Carmelite habit
- Patronage: People ridiculed for being pious

Giovanna Scopelli, O.Carm (1428 – 9 July 1491) was an Italian Carmelite nun who established her own convent. Scopelli was forbidden to enter the third order branch of the order during her adolescence and waited until her parents died to embrace the religious life.

Scopelli was beatified on 24 August 1771 under Pope Clement XIV when the latter approved her local cultus.

== Life ==
Giovanna Scopelli was born in 1428 in Reggio Emilia to Simone and Caterina Scopelli.

From her childhood she felt a strong attraction to the religious life though her parents disapproved of this vocation and forbade her to pursue it. Scopelli submitted to this and so led her austere and pious life at home until the death of her parents around 1480, when she then decided to form the Carmelite convent of Santa Maria del Popolo while in the process becoming one. Before she founded this a widow offered to collaborate with her and the former's two daughters and the four lived together in a makeshift convent – a small house – from 1480 until 1484. She later bought the church of Saint Bernard in 1485 with the aid of the Bishop Filippo Zoboli. Scopelli became the new convent's first prioress. She also refused all gifts – and urged her fellow religious to do the same thing – unless such gifts were given as alms with no conditions attached. In 1487 a priest was assigned to them as their confessor. The nuns became known as "The White Nuns".

Scopelli died in mid-1491 and her remains were interred in the gardens of the convent, and were found to be incorrupt following their exhumation in 1492. Her convent was later suppressed in 1797 and her remains moved as a result in 1803.

== Beatification ==
The beatification process commenced under Pope Alexander VI in 1500, when she became titled as a Servant of God and a tribunal was commissioned in order to collect testimonies. The cause reactivated with a diocesan process that was inaugurated in 1767 and concluded its business later in 1770.

The process culminated on 24 August 1771 when her beatification received the formal approval of Pope Clement XIV who deemed that there was an enduring local 'cultus' – otherwise known as popular and longstanding veneration – to the late Scopelli.
