= Maria Anna Donati =

Italian Roman Catholic professed religious

Blessed Maria Anna Donati

Religious
- Born: 26 October 1848; Marradi, Florence, Grand Duchy of Tuscany
- Died: 18 March 1925 (aged 76); Florence, Kingdom of Italy
- Venerated in: Roman Catholic Church
- Beatified: 30 March 2008, Basilica di Santa Maria del Fiore, Florence, Italy by Cardinal José Saraiva Martins
- Feast: 18 March
- Attributes: Religious habit; Crucifix
- Patronage: Calasanzian Sisters; Orphans

Maria Anna Donati (26 October 1848 - 18 March 1925) was an Italian Roman Catholic nun who had established the Calasanzian Sisters in Florence with the aid of Celestino Zini. Upon her profession as a religious she assumed the new name of "Celestina of the Mother of God" in honor of Zini.

Her beatification was celebrated in Florence on 30 March 2008 - Cardinal José Saraiva Martins celebrated it on behalf of Pope Benedict XVI who had approved the beatification months prior.

== Life ==
Maria Anna Donati was born in Florence on 26 October 1848 to the judge Francesco Donati; a sibling was Gemma. Donati received her First Communion at the age of thirteen in 1861.

In her childhood she spent an extensive period of time with nuns of the Vallumbrosan Order at Vallombrosan and even desired entering the religious life upon realizing that their manner of life was the one in which she felt she was called to; her father prevented her from doing so. However, her time with them was inconclusive, for she failed to perceive the full depth of her calling and instead had a brief understanding of what she aspired for. It was around this time that she placed herself under the spiritual direction of the Piarist Celestino Zini – the future Archbishop of Siena. In her Zini saw spiritual richness and he encouraged her to listen for God and his call to service.

Her father could not bear being separated from Donati and so forbade her from entering the religious life. This was coupled with the fact that, when she was 33 in 1881, her mother died and her father become far more attached to her and relied more upon her around the house. At the age of 40 in 1888, she once more expressed her will to become a nun and her reluctant father demanded that she take him as well as an aunt and Donati's sister Gemma with her. Francesco said to her: "I want you to be near me to close my eyes when my last hour strikes".

In 1889 she established – under the guidance of Zini – the Calasanzian Sisters, which was made as a female congregation with the sole task of educating children with an emphasis on the poor and on the children of prisoners. Her profession – alongside four companions on 24 June 1889 – saw her assume the new religious name of "Celestina of the Mother of God" in honor of Zini. The congregation would receive the diocesan approval of the Archbishop of Florence Cardinal Agostino Bausa on 21 September 1892 and allowed for the order to open its first school in the archdiocese on 28 December 1889 since it could operate on a diocesan level and that alone. The congregation received its first orphan on 22 June 1891 and thus allowed for all orphans and abandoned children to enter the congregation's doors for aid. The order later received the papal approval of Pope Pius X on 18 December 1911 and had, on 28 February 1920, its constitutions receive the approval of Pope Benedict XV. Donati was known amongst her peers for her ardent commitment to the teachings of Joseph Calasanz. With Zini's death in 1892 she was forced to assume control of the order herself.

Donati died on 18 March 1925. Her order is also present in Brazil and El Salvador and as of 2005 possessed nineteen houses with 99 religious professed into it.

== Beatification ==
The proceedings for the sanctification process opened in Florence with dual processes that investigated her life and the manner in which she exercised both the cardinal virtues and the theological virtues. Both processes also collated her writings in order to perceive the depth of her religious life and to ensure such writings did not contradict the dogma of the faith. Her writings were cleared of this and were granted a decree of approval on 1 April 1969 and thus were incorporated into the cause.

The formal introduction of the cause was on 12 July 1982 in which the Congregation for the Causes of Saints granted their approval to the cause and bestowed upon Donati the posthumous title of Servant of God - the first stage in the process.

The two processes were both ratified on 5 July 1985 and were sent in large boxes to Rome for further investigation in order for the Congregation for the Causes of Saints to commence the so-called "Roman Phase" and begin their own line of research into the cause and into Donati's life and virtues. The Positio - containing biographical details and attesting to her virtues - was submitted to Rome in 1991.

Donati was declared to be Venerable on 6 April 1998 after Pope John Paul II acknowledged the fact that Donati had lived a model life of the heroic virtue both cardinal and theological.

Pope Benedict XVI approved a miracle attributed to her direct intercession on 1 June 2007 and thus allowed for her beatification to take place. The beatification was celebrated in the Basilica di Santa Maria del Fiore in Florence on 30 March 2008; Cardinal José Saraiva Martins presided over it on the behalf of the pontiff.

The current postulator assigned to the cause is Father Mateusz Pindelski.
