= Jean-Bernard Rousseau =

French teacher (1797–1867)

Blessed Jean-Bernard Rousseau F.S.C.

Religious
- Born: 22 March 1797; Annay la Côte, Yonne, French First Republic
- Died: 13 April 1867 (aged 70); Sainte-Marie, Réunion, Second French Empire
- Venerated in: Roman Catholic Church
- Beatified: 2 May 1989, Réunion, France by Pope John Paul II
- Feast: 13 April
- Patronage: Catechists; Teachers

Jean-Bernard Rousseau, FSC (22 March 1797 – 13 April 1867) was a French Catholic member of the De La Salle Brothers. He assumed the religious name Scubilion upon his profession and was dubbed the "Catechist of Slaves" due to his extensive decades-spanning work on Réunion Island.

He was beatified in 1989 during the visit of Pope John Paul II to the island.

== Life ==
Jean-Bernard Rousseau was born in Yonne on 22 March 1797 as the eldest of four children to Bernard Rousseau and Regina Pelletier. His parents aided and hid priests during the French Revolution in which anti-religious sentiment was at an all-time high. He was baptized hours after his birth at the home of his grandparents and would receive both his First Communion and Confirmation around the age of ten in 1807.

The parish priest oversaw his education but this stopped with the death of the priest on 19 April 1811. A new pastor oversaw the rest of his education from October 4, 1818, onwards. Rousseau decided to devote his life to serving others and so desired to become part of the Institute of the Brothers of the Christian Schools – or De La Salle Brothers – in an attempt to follow the example of Saint Jean-Baptiste de La Salle. He arrived in Paris on 9 November 1822 and commenced his novitiate with the De La Salle Brothers on 24 December 1822. He assumed the religious name of "Scubilion". On 4 November 1823 he was sent to Alençon and was put in charge of the De La Salle house's kitchen and garden. His triennial vows were made on 15 September 1825. He made his perpetual vows on 27 September 1827 after a period of teaching and of studies. He obtained his teaching degree in 1826.

In April 1833 he accepted an invitation to go to Réunion Island in the Indian Ocean to teach and evangelize. He and two other companions left on 20 April 1833 and arrived in Saint-Denis on 15 July 1833 on the ship "La Commerce". In the period of 1833 to 1843 he began to teach to poor children and at this time became a vocal advocate of slaves. He also fought against the mistreatment and abuse that female slaves suffered. On 17 November 1843 he was sent to Saint-Leu and began teaching there while also preparing slaves for baptism and their First Communion. He arrived in Sainte-Marie on 14 December 1856 to continue his work. Rousseau made a brief visit to Madagascar in 1866 to open a school. He modified all his lessons to suit the natives and also started night classes. He also collaborated in his initiatives with the local priests.

He died on 13 April 1867 after a long illness in Sainte-Marie and his funeral was celebrated on 14 April in which hundreds of people attended to mourn him. He was buried in Sainte-Marie but his remains were transferred in 1939 to the house of the De La Salle Brothers in Saint-Denis.

== Beatification ==
The beatification process commenced in Saint-Denis-de-La Réunion in an informative process that spanned from 1902 until 1905 and was tasked with collecting all available documentation and other information on Rousseau's life and his activities as a catechist and educator. The second process was held in Marseille from 1904 and 1905 during the time of the first. The theologians assigned to the cause collated all of his writings and evaluated them in order to ensure that his views were in line with the magisterium of the Roman Catholic faith. The writings were approved in a formal decree issued in 1912. It was not until several decades later that another process was held in 1976.

These processes commenced despite the fact that the Congregation for the Causes of Saints did not issue their formal approval – or "nihil obstat" (nothing against) – to the cause until 30 March 1981 in a move that also accorded Rousseau with the posthumous title of Servant of God. One final process was dispensed due to the fact that there was enough evidence gathered in the previous processes.

Formal conclusion to the processes allowed for the postulation to compile the Positio – consisting of biographical details and attesting to the positives of his cause – and submitted it to C.C.S. officials in Rome for their own personal investigation. Their consulting theologians met and approved the merits of the cause on 21 March 1984 while the C.C.S. followed suit on 5 June 1984. On 9 June 1984 he was proclaimed to be Venerable after Pope John Paul II acknowledged the fact that Rousseau had lived a model Christian life of heroic virtue.

The miracle required for his beatification was under evaluation in the diocese of its origin and was then sent to Roman officials for their investigation. The C.C.S. declared the process to have completed its work and ratified it in 1983. The pope approved it in 1987 and beatified Rousseau on the occasion of his visit to the island of Réunion on 2 May 1989.

The current postulator assigned to the cause is Rodolfo Cosimo Meoli.
