= Salvatore Lilli =

Italian friar, missionary, and martyr

Blessed Salvatore Lilli
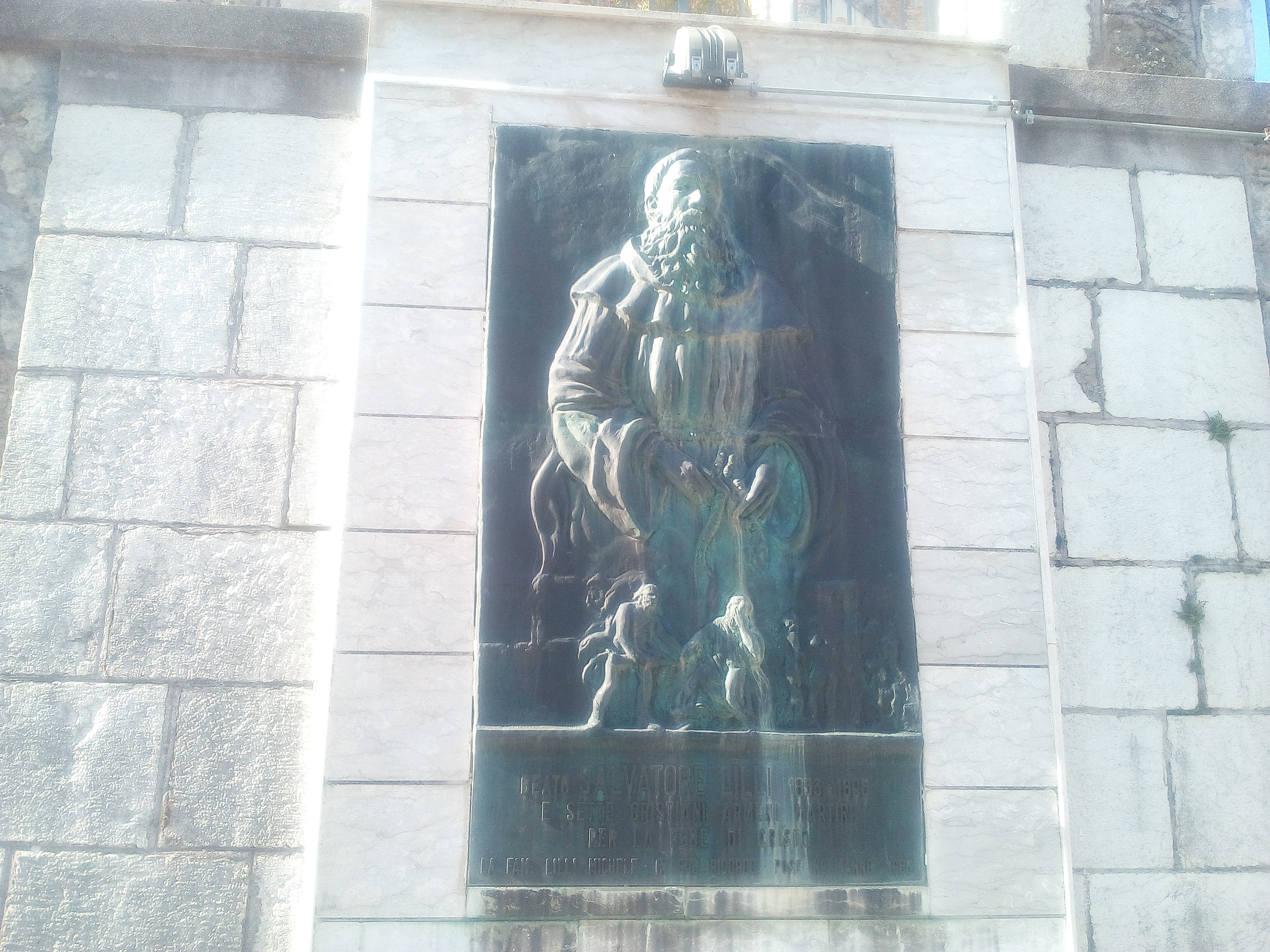
- Sculpture dedicated to Salvatore Lilli

Martyr
- Born: 19 June 1853; Cappadocia, Abruzzo, Italy
- Died: November 22, 1895 (aged 42); Turkey
- Venerated in: Roman Catholicism
- Beatified: 3 October 1982 by Pope John Paul II
- Feast: 22 November

Salvatore Lilli was a Franciscan priest and a martyr killed by the Muslim Turks under Abdul Hamid on 22 November 1895.

== Early life ==
He was born on 19 June 1853 in Cappadocia, Abruzzo, Italy to Vincenzo and Annunziata Lilli. He joined Franciscan in 1870 and make his final vows on 6 August 1871.

== Religious life ==
He was ordained on 6 April 1878 in Bethlehem. He served as a missionary in Armenia. He also built schools, clinics and homes for abandoned. He taught modern hygiene and sanitation in villages. He worked with the sick during a cholera epidemic in 1891.

== Persecution and death ==
He was serving as a parish priest and superior of the Franciscan House at Mujukderesi, Turkey, at the time of death. He was arrested by Turks along with his seven companions and forced to embrace Islam, to which Lille and his companions refused and hence they were killed and their bodies desecrated and burned.

== Beatification ==
Theologians approved Lilli's spiritual writings on 19 May 1939, and he and his companions were later declared Servants of God.

On 3 October 1982, Pope John Paul II beatified Salvatore Lilli and his companions. The feast day is celebrated on 19 November.

== Bibliography ==
- Aghassi (pseud. Garabed Toursarkisian), L'assassinat du Père Salvatore par le soldats turcs. Témoignage d'Aghassi, l'un des quatre chefs de l'insurrection du Zéïtoun, trad. Archag Tchobanian, pref. Pierre Quillard, Parigi, Mercure de France, 1897.
- Aghassi, Zeïtoun, depuis les origines jusqu'à l'insurrection de 1895..., Traduction d'Archag Tchobanian. Préface par Victor Bérard, 1897
- Gian Crisostomo Guzzo, Vita e martirio dei servi di Dio p. Salvatore Lilli e compagni: martirizzati in Armenia nel 1895, Venezia, Tipografia S. Marco, 1942.
- Salvatore Lilli (nipote del martire), Vita del padre Salvatore Lilli da Cappadocia della provincia romana di S. Michele Arcangelo martirizzato nell'Armenia Minore il 22 novembre 1895, Gerusalemme, Tipografia dei PP. Francescani, 1949.
- AA.VV.Salvatore Lilli e sette cristiani armeni martiri per la fede di Cristo, supplemento di "La terra santa: pubblicazione mensile della Custodia francescana", 1982.
