= Basilica of Our Mother of Mercy =

Church building in Maribor City Municipality, Slovenia

Coordinates: 46°33′36″N 15°39′00″E

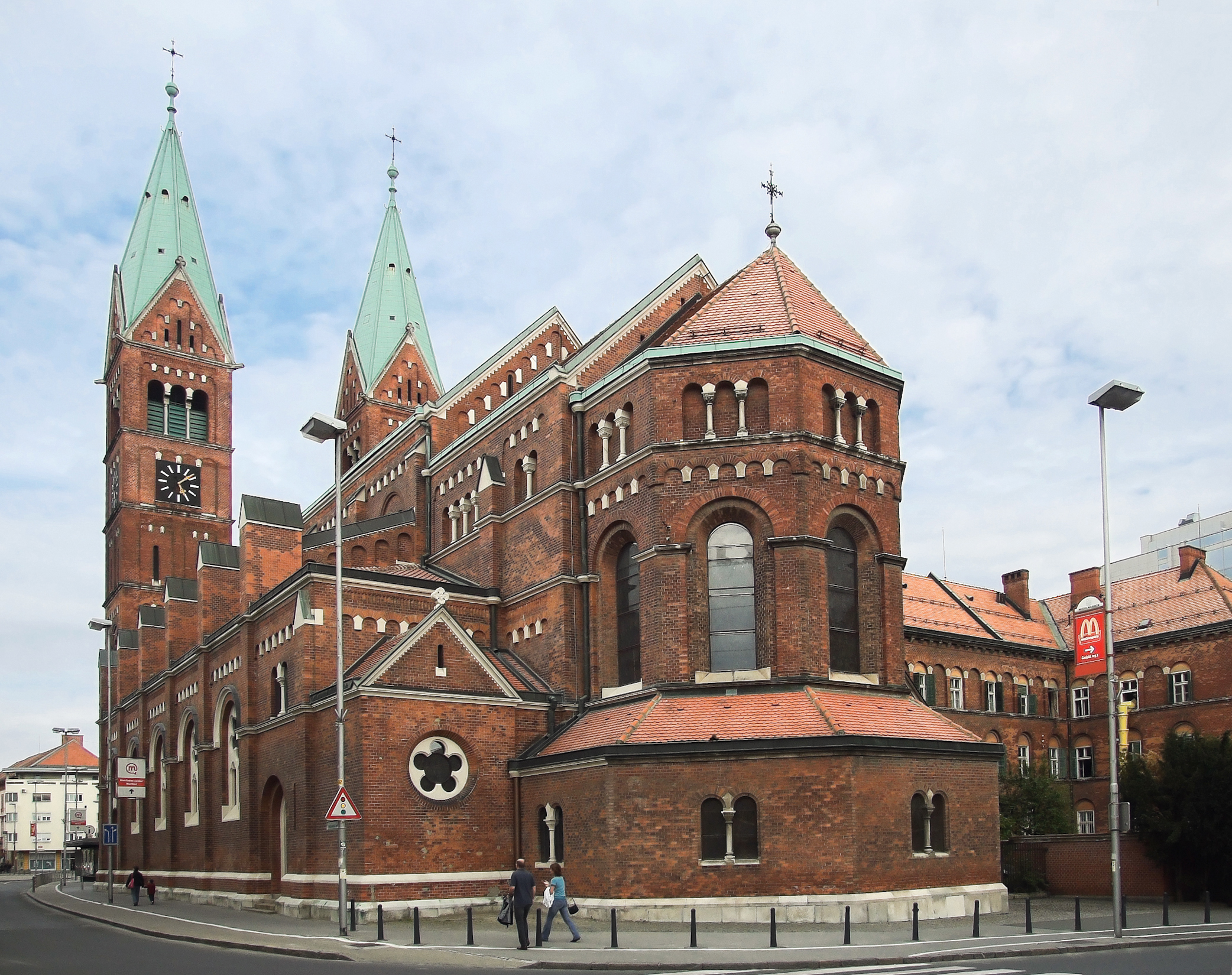

The Basilica of Our Mother of Mercy (Slovene: bazilika Matere Usmiljenja) is a Franciscan church in Maribor, Slovenia.

== See also ==
- Capuchin Church (Maribor)
