= Capuchin Church (Maribor) =

Church in Slovenia

Coordinates: 46°33′36″N 15°39′00″E

Capuchin Church was a church of the Capuchins in Maribor in Slovenia. It was built in the 17th century and replaced by the Franciscan Church near the end of the 19th century. From 1890 to 1891, the New Chapel of the Great Cemetery was built according to the design of the architect Kārlis Neiburgers, supervised by the architect Kārlis Felsko and the engineer F. Engelsons. This was the fourth chapel to be built here. The previous one was built between 1859 and 1861 to a design by Johann Daniel Felsko.

== See also ==
- Basilica of Our Mother of Mercy
