= Diego José de Cádiz =

Spanish Capuchin friar and saint

Blessed Didacus Joseph O.F.M. Cap.
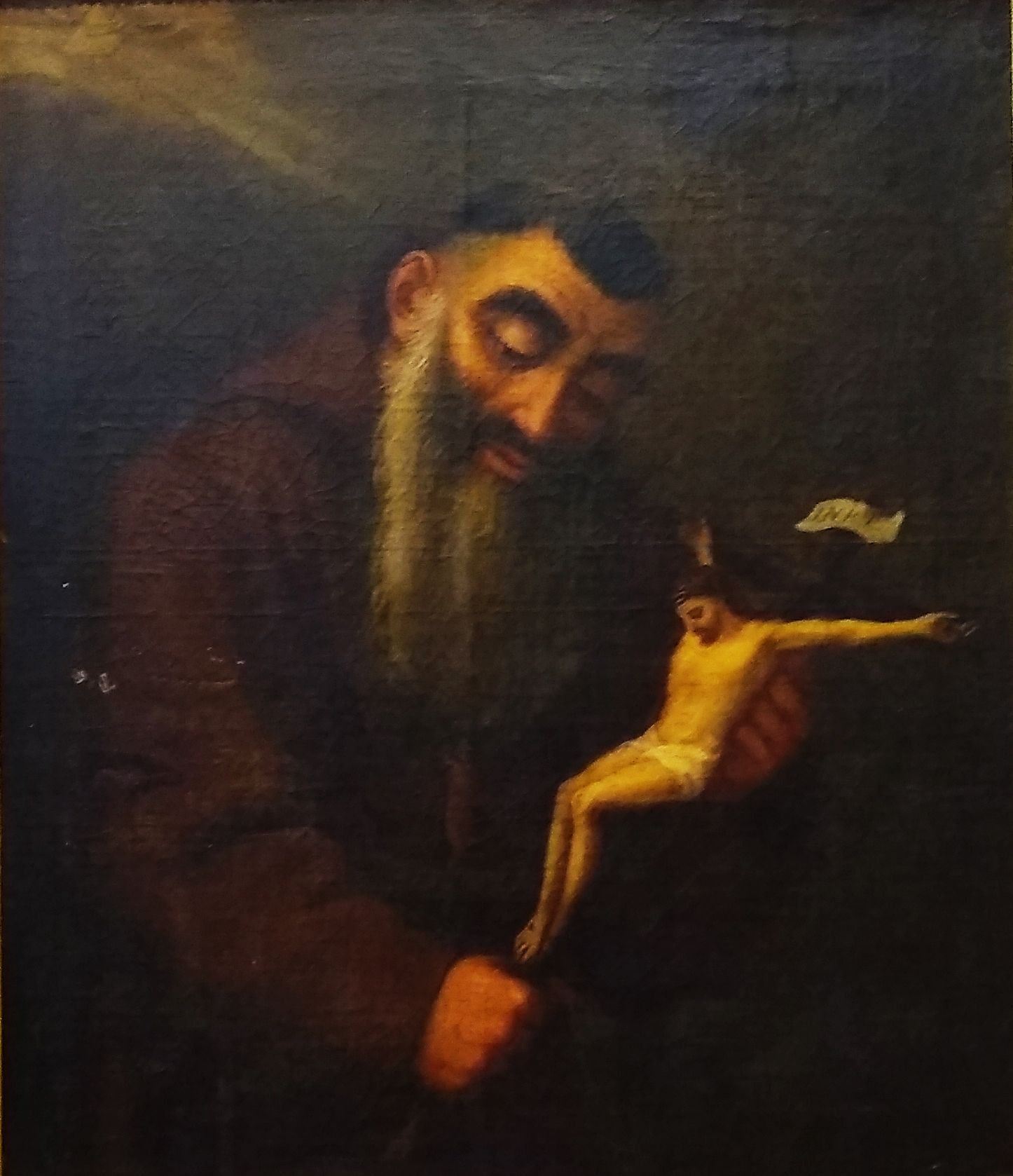
- Apostle of Lower Andalusia.

Religious, priest and missionary
- Born: 30 March 1743; Cádiz, Spain
- Died: 24 March 1801 (aged 57); Ronda, Spain
- Venerated in: Catholic Church (Spain and the Franciscan Order)
- Beatified: 22 April 1894, Saint Peter's Basilica, Kingdom of Italy by Pope Leo XIII
- Major shrine: Sanctuario de la Virgen de la Paz, Plaza beato Fray Diego José de Cádiz; Ronda, Málaga, Spain
- Feast: 24 March
- Attributes: Franciscan habit

Diego José de Cádiz (1743–1801) was a Spanish Capuchin friar who was a noted and popular preacher throughout the region of Andalusia during the 18th century. He was beatified by the Catholic Church in 1894.

== Life ==
=== Early life ===
José Francisco López-Caamaño y García Pérez was born in Cádiz in 1743. His mother died when he was 9 years old. Later, his father moved the family to the city of Grazalema, where he entered the local school run by the Dominican Order. As a youth, Joseph could make no progress at school, receiving the nickname of the "dunce of Cádiz". Later a classmate, a Dominican friar named Antonio Querero, testified how difficult study had been for him.

Initially rejected by the Observant Franciscan friars due to this perceived limitation of intellect, López-Caamaño was later accepted by the Capuchin friars and, at the age of 15, entered their novitiate in Seville, at which time he was given the name Didacus Joseph. He was professed as a member of the Order on 31 March 1759. He was ordained to the priesthood in Carmona in 1766, for which he prepared himself by an extremely ascetic life.

=== Capuchin preacher ===
In 1771, after further training in homiletics, he was assigned to one of the teams of friars who would preach parish missions to residents of isolated, rural villages, which was a major focus of the Capuchins of that era.

Spain was undergoing changes in its intellectual climate, as the influence of the Enlightenment began to spread in the upper classes of the country. Didacus became a major force in promoting the traditional devotions and beliefs of Catholicism as part of the identity of the nation, and is seen as an early integrist in the development of Spanish culture, opposing Liberal Catholicism. He also was a strong critic of the policy of consumerism, being promoted in the universities and some government circles. For this teaching, he was denounced to the Spanish Inquisition for attacking royal prerogatives. In turn, he accused the proponents of new economic policies and the secularization of Spanish society of heresy. He preached at the Royal Court in 1783, but found that he had little effect on the nobility.

Didacus was appointed an official of the Inquisition, the synodal examiner for almost all Spanish dioceses and an honorary canon. In 1779, the University of Granada conferred upon him the honorary degrees of Master of Arts and doctorates in Theology and canon law. A collection of his sermons numbers 3,000.

== Death and veneration ==
Didacus died in 1801, apparently as a result of yellow fever, at the age of 58, in Ronda, Málaga. His remains are kept for veneration in an urn in the small, simple chapel of Our Lady of Peace (Spanish: la Virgen de la Paz) in Ronda where he died, on the square now named in the friar's honor.

He was beatified by Pope Leo XIII in 1894.

== See also ==
- Diego José de Cádiz, patron saint archive
