= Sanctuary of San Camillo de Lellis =

Roman Catholic church in Milan, Italy

Coordinates: 45°28′56″N 9°12′14″E

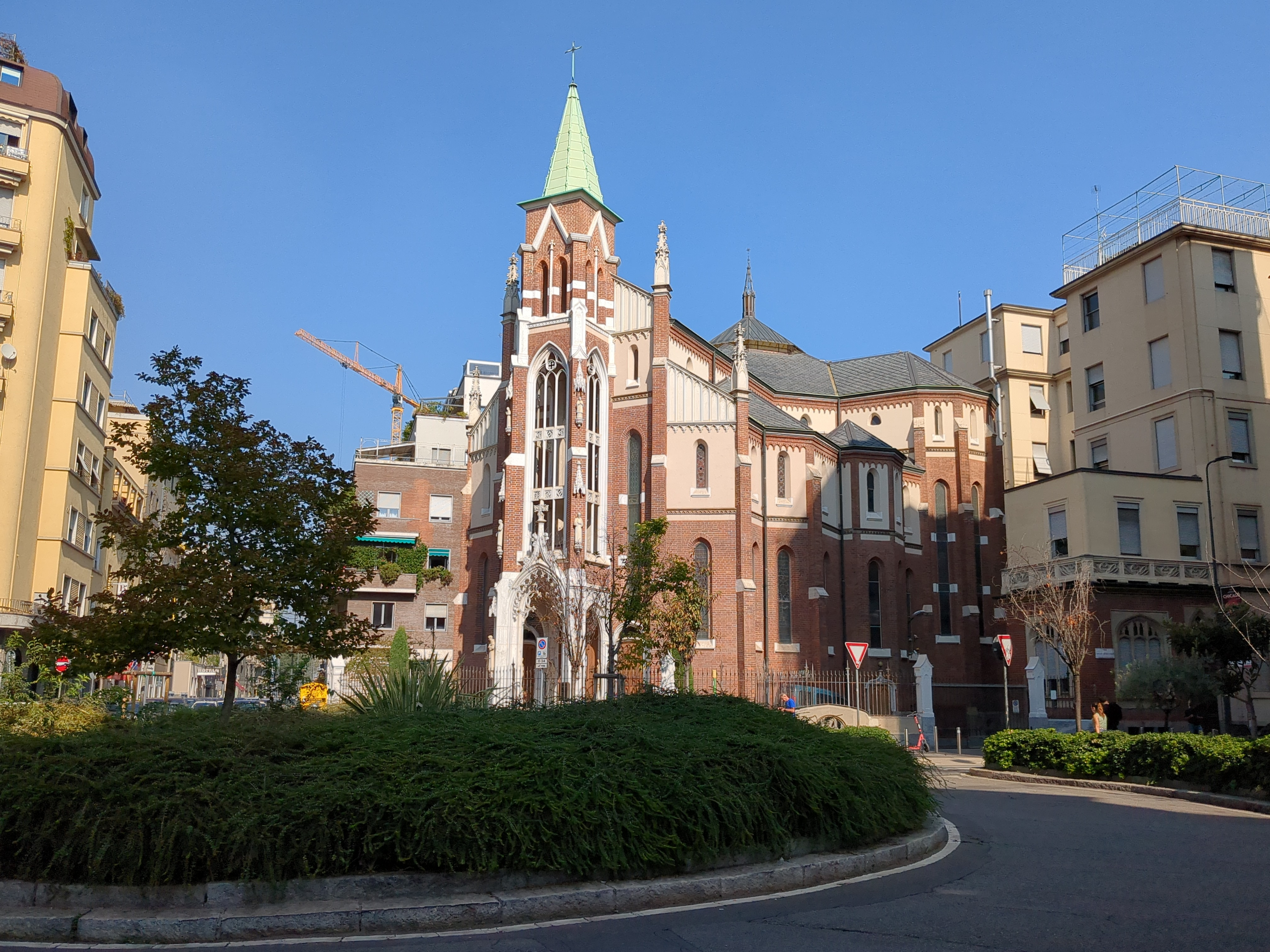
The church on a sunny day.

Sanctuary San Camillo de Lellis is a church in Milan, Italy.

== Introduction ==
The Sanctuary of San Camillo de Lellis (Italian: Santuario di San Camillo de Lellis) is a Neo-Gothic church located in Milan, Italy. It is situated at Via Ruggero Boscovich 25, near Milan’s Central Station, making it a prominent and easily accessible site for visitors. The sanctuary is dedicated to Saint Camillus de Lellis, the patron saint of the sick, nurses, and hospitals.

== History ==
The Camillians, formally known as the Order of Clerks Regular, Ministers to the Sick, arrived in Milan in 1585 at the invitation of Bishop Gaspare Visconti. Initially, they served at the Ca' Granda, Milan’s main hospital, and later established themselves in other locations. In the late 17th century, they constructed the Church of Santa Maria della Sanità. Following a period of suppression during the Napoleonic era, the Camillians returned to Milan in 1896.

The current sanctuary was built in the early 20th century and inaugurated in 1912. It was dedicated to Saint Camillus de Lellis, reflecting the order’s mission to care for the sick and needy.

== Architecture ==
The sanctuary is a fine example of Neo-Gothic architecture. The façade is characterized by a blend of brickwork and plaster, with notable features such as a spired tower, a wooden portal, and triple lancet windows adorned with marble medallions. The interior includes three naves enriched with sculptures, paintings and murals.

== Artistic Features ==
One of the sanctuary’s highlights is its collection of 123 stained glass windows created by Cisterna, which illuminate the interior with vivid colors. Another notable feature is the Via Crucis by Brother Annibale Pagnone, a wooden relief depicting the Stations of the Cross. This masterpiece includes over 500 intricately carved figures, showcasing exceptional craftsmanship.

== Cultural Significance ==
The sanctuary serves as both a place of worship and a historical symbol of the Camillian mission in Milan. Its location near Milan’s Central Station makes it a popular destination for those interested in religious history and Gothic architecture.
