= Santissima Trinità a Via Condotti =

- Santissima Trinità degli Spagnoli
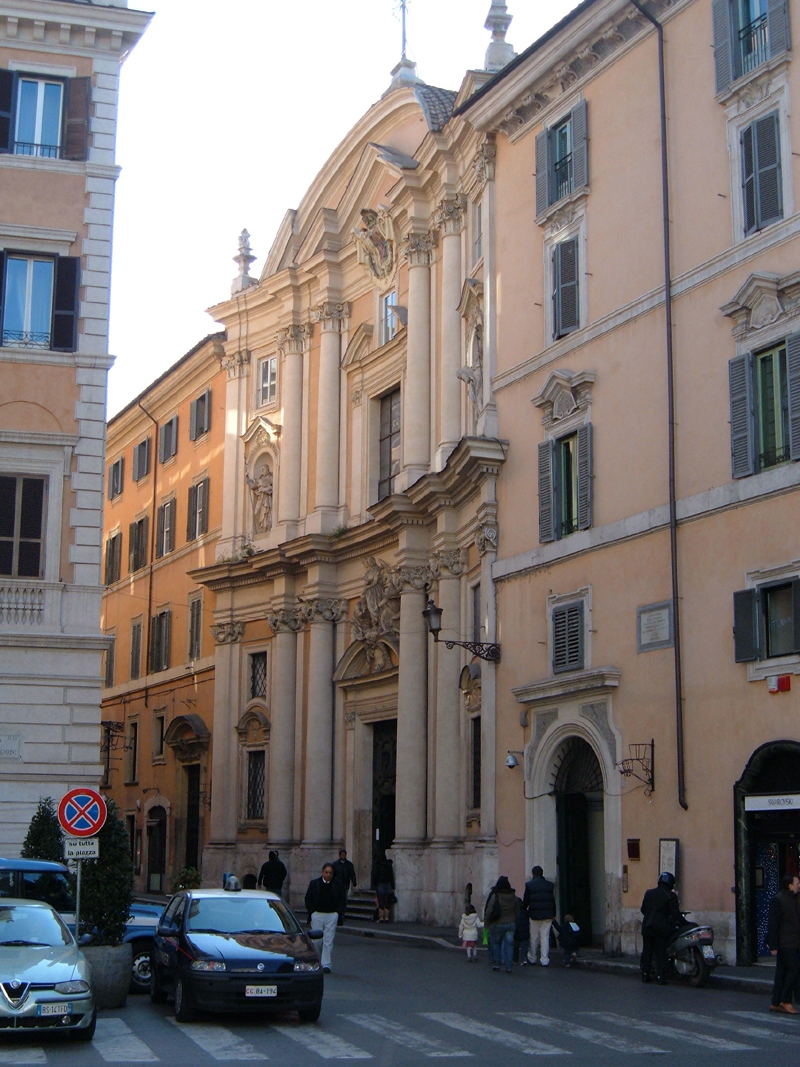
- Facade
- Click on the map for a fullscreen view
- 41°54′16″N 12°28′45″E
- Location: Via Condotti, Campo Marzio, Rome
- Country: Italy
- Denomination: Roman Catholic
- Religious order: Dominicans; Trinitarians (former)

History
- Status: national church

Architecture
- Architect: Emanuele Rodriguez Dos Santos
- Architectural type: Church
- Groundbreaking: 1741
- Completed: 1746

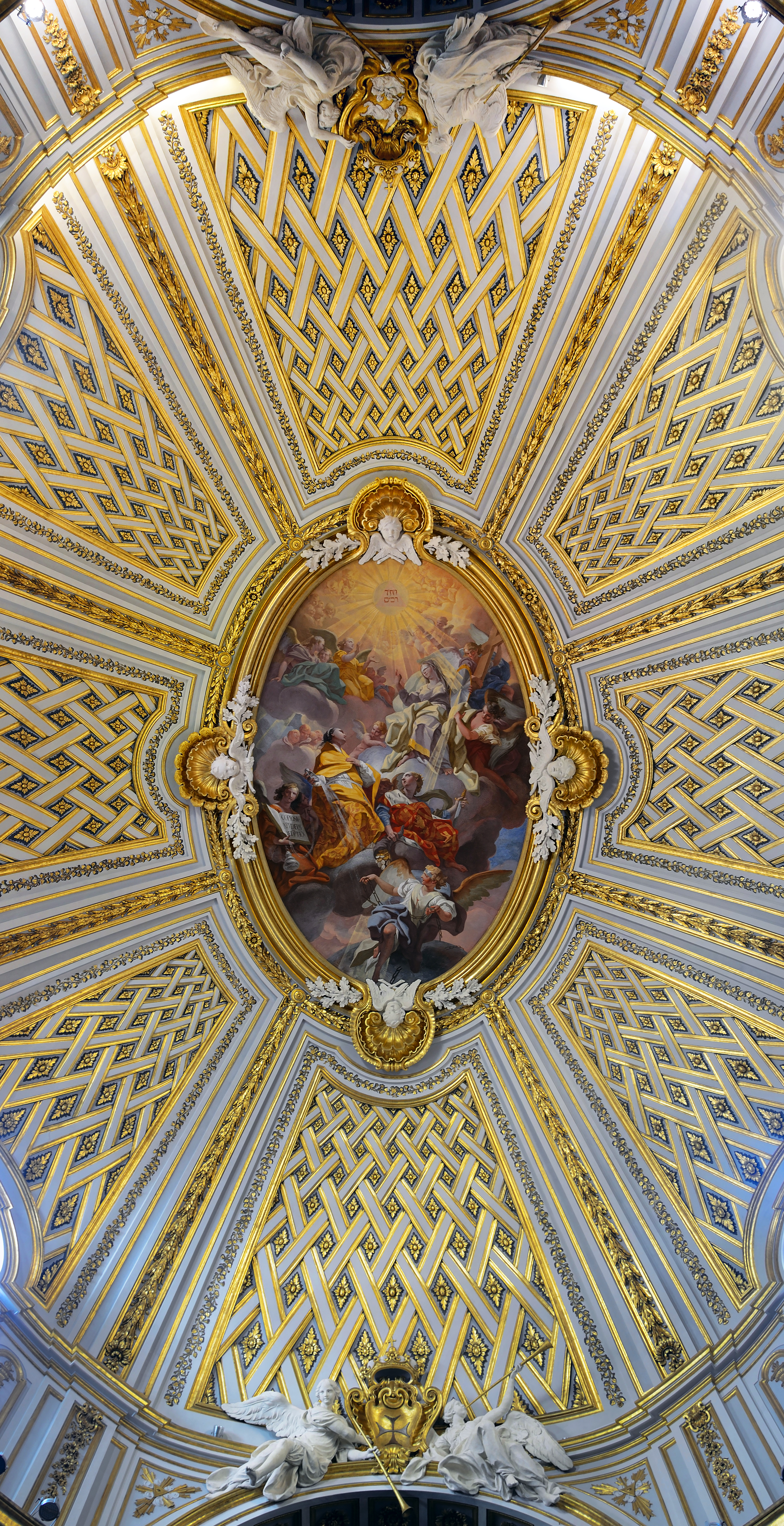
The ceiling end the dome.

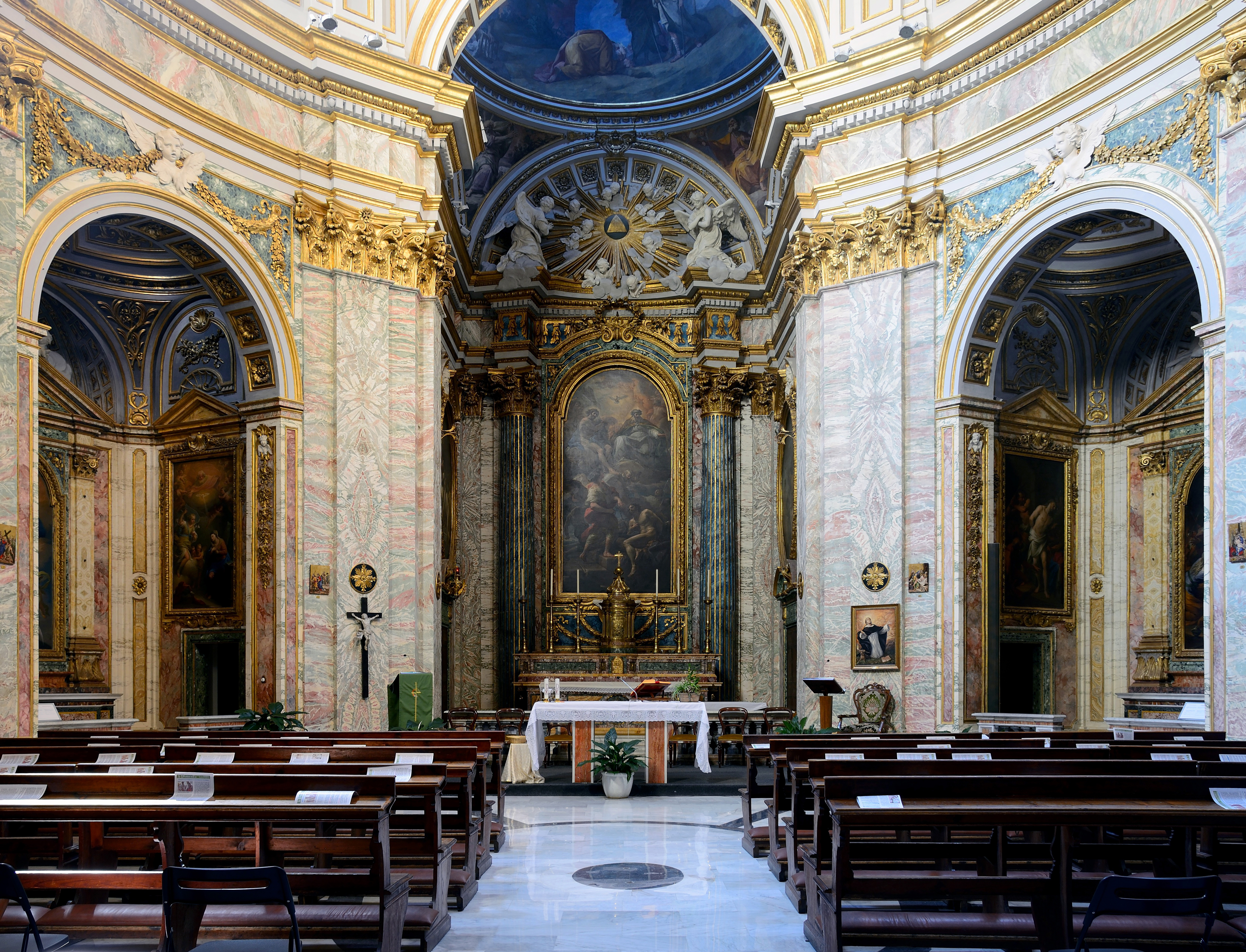
Interior.

Santissima Trinità a Via Condotti or Santissima Trinità degli Spagnoli is a church in Rome at the start of via Condotti in the Campo Marzio district. It is one of the national churches of Spain in Rome.

== History ==
The church and its adjoining convent were built by the Spanish Trinitarians between 1741 and 1746 under pope Benedict XIV. They were designed by the Portuguese architect Emanuele Rodriguez dos Santos, assisted by Giuseppe Sardi. It was on the site of the former palazzo Ruccellai, bought in 1733 for 25474 Roman scudi by Father Lorenzo of the Trinitarian Order, in the name of the provinces of Castiglia, Leone and Navarre. Shortly afterwards the foundation was placed under the protection of the Spanish crown.

The church has a concave facade with statues of the order's two founders saint John of Matha and saint Felix of Valois and the coat of arms of Philip V of Spain.

== Interior ==
Its interior has a vestibule and then an elliptical plan with seven inter-communicating chapels (four to the right and three to the left), housing the original paintings placed in them in the 18th century.

The high altarpiece of 'The Most Holy Trinity and the freeing of a slave' is by Corrado Giaquinto. Above it are two smaller works by Antonio González Velázquez showing 'Abraham and the three angels' and 'Abraham and Sarah'. The main ceiling painting shows Saint John of Matha in glory (Gregorio Guglielmi) and those in the side chapels are by Andrea Casali.

The community had shrunk by 1880, when its superiors decided to turn the convent into a Dominican college for missionaries to the Far East.

== Bibliography ==
- M. Armellini, Le chiese di Roma dal secolo IV al XIX, Roma 1891, p. 337
- C. Rendina, Le Chiese di Roma, Newton & Compton Editori, Milano 2000, p. 362
- M. Quercioli, Rione IV Campo Marzio, in AA.VV, I rioni di Roma, Newton & Compton Editori, Milano 2000, Vol. I, pp. 264–334
