= Emanuele Rodriguez Dos Santos =

Portuguese Baroque architect (c.1702–1764)

Emanuele Rodriguez dos Santos (c. 1702 – 22 March 1764, in Rome) was a Portuguese Baroque architect, principally active in Rome. His most important work is the church of SS. Trinità dei Spagnoli in the via Condotti.

== Career ==
Very little is known of Dos Santos’ early life. He is first encountered in the bottega of Mastro Calegni, a cabinet maker, and it is not until 1721 that he is mentioned as an architect.

His first public commissions as an architect were for temporary decorations. He is mentioned in this capacity in the design for decorations commissioned by the Portuguese Franciscan, Josè Maria de Fonseca y Evora, for the festivities surrounding the canonisation of the Franciscan saints Jacopo della Marca and Francesco Solano in 1727 and Margherita da Cortona and Giovanni da Prado in 1728. These decorations were installed on the façade and in the interior of S. Maria in Aracœli (the Franciscan church on the Capitoline Hill in Rome) and are known through engravings.

Between 1732 and 1734, as architect of the congregation of the Ministri degli Infirmi, Dos Santos directed the completion of works at the church of S. Maria Maddalena, the final phase of the construction of which had commenced at the end of the 17th century under the direction of Carlo Quadri. Alessandra Marino believes that the design for the highly unusual façade decoration should be attributed to Dos Santos, rather than Giuseppe Sardi. If this is so, Dos Santos’ earlier training as a cabinet maker would have been critical, as the decoration added to the pre-existing superstructure is commonly encountered in Italian cabinet work of the period, including the cantorie of contemporary churches including S. Maria della Quercia and S. Maria Maddalena itself.

Dos Santos’ most important commission was that of the church, convent and hospice of the Trinitari Calzati, which extended from the via del Corso down the via Condotti. Dos Santos’ participation in this project, which was carried out almost entirely to his own design, is documented from 1732. His relationship with the Trinitari Calzati turned sour in 1746 when Ferdinando Fuga was called upon to provide perizie on the project. Dos Santos was ultimately replaced by Josè Hermosilla y Sandoval, although Hermosilla y Sandoval’s involvement was primarily limited to the interior decoration of the church.

Dos Santos worked as the architect for the fathers of the church of S. Antonio dei Portoghesi from 1733 until 1750, mostly on ephemeral architecture and the provision of perizie and stime. One of his last known works is the construction of the altar of S. Andrea Corsini in the church of the Bambino Gesù in 1736 upon a commission of the Portuguese Mons. D’Almeyda. Nothing is known of his activities between 1750 and his death in 1764.
