= Nicola D'Onofrio =

Venerable Nicola D'Onofrio M.I.
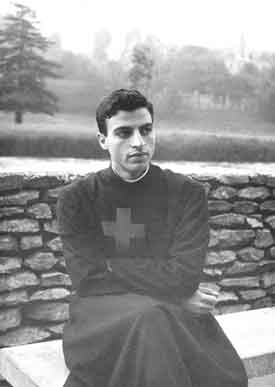
- Born: 24 March 1943; Villamagna, Chieti, Abruzzo, Italy
- Died: 12 June 1964 (aged 21); Rome, Italy
- Occupation: Seminarian

Venerable Nicola D'Onofrio (24 March 1943 – 12 June 1964) was a Catholic Seminarian and member of the Camillian order from Abruzzo, Italy who was declared Venerable by Pope Francis in 2013.

== Early life ==
Nicola D'Onofrio was born in Villamagna, Italy, to Giovanni and Virginia Ferrara D'Onofrio. His interest in the Camillians began in his childhood when he saw the large red cross on their religious habit. When he was ten years old, a Camillian priest invited him to join the Camillian students in Rome. After studying for one year, his parents gave him permission to join the Camillian school. He entered the school on the feast day of Saint Thérèse of Lisieux.

== Religious Life ==
D'Onofrio took his simple religious vows. He was devoted to Saint Thérèse of Lisieux and received daily Eucharist. He studied the works of Saint Camillus de Lellis, the founder of his order, and dedicated time to the needs of his religious community.

== Illness and death ==
Nicola began to feel the first symptoms of illness in 1962 but did not receive a diagnosis until six months later. On 30 July 1963, he was operated on and diagnosed with sarcoma, which had begun to metastasize. In January 1964, an X-Ray revealed his cancer had spread to his lungs. D'Onofrio was sent to Lourdes and Lisieux for the grace of healing. A fellow Camillian, when saying goodbye before his pilgrimage, said, "Over the next few days all of us will pray for you", to which Nicola replied, "Yes, but pray not for my healing, pray that I may do the will of God."

A request was sent to Pope Paul VI to allow him to take his perpetual vows. He was granted permission and took his vows on 28 May 1964. On 5 June, he was given the Sacrament of the Sick. On 12 June, his family and close friends surrounded him. He spent the entire day in prayer and died at 9:15 pm. He was 21 years old.

== Cause for Sainthood ==
In June 2000, the cause for beatification was opened and on 5 July 2013, Pope Francis declared him venerable.
