= John Henry Parker (writer) =

English archaeologist, writer and publisher (1806–1884)

John Henry Parker CB
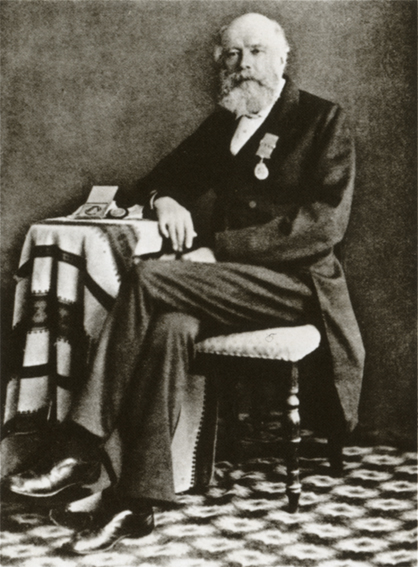
- Portrait photograph
- Born: 1 March 1806; London, England
- Died: 31 January 1884 (aged 77); Oxford, England
- Resting place: St Sepulchre's Cemetery, Oxford, England
- Education: Manor House School
- Occupations: Archaeologist; writer; publisher
- Employer: Ashmolean Museum
- Known for: Keeper of the Ashmolean Museum
- Spouse: Frances Mary Hoskyns
- Children: James Parker
- Father: John Parker
- Relatives: Joseph Parker (uncle)

John Henry Parker CB (1 March 1806 – 31 January 1884) was an English archaeologist, writer on architecture, and publisher.

== Biography ==
He was born in London, the son of John Parker, a merchant there. He was educated at Manor House School, Chiswick, and was apprenticed in 1821 to his uncle, the Oxford bookseller Joseph Parker (1774?–1850). He succeeded to his uncle's business in 1832, and ran the firm successfully, the most important of his publications being perhaps the series of the Oxford Pocket Classics.

Parker married Frances Mary Hoskyns on 7 February 1832, at St Lawrence's Church, Appleton (then in Berkshire, now in Oxfordshire). She was the daughter of James Williams Hoskyns, Fellow of Magdalen College, and Rector of Appleton from 1802 to 1844. The couple had a shared love of antiquarianism. Her father was very opposed to the marriage, though presumably eventually relented, as they married in his church. Frances died on 15 December 1854 after a short illness.

In 1836, Parker published his Glossary of terms used in Grecian, Roman, Italian, and Gothic architecture, which, published during the Gothic Revival in England, had considerable influence in extending the movement, and supplied valuable inspiration to young architects. In 1848 he edited the fifth edition of Thomas Rickman's Gothic architecture, and in 1849 he published a handbook based on his earlier volume entitled Introduction to the study of Gothic architecture. The completion of Hudson Turner's Domestic architecture of the Middle Ages next engaged his attention, three volumes being published (1853–60). He published Medieval architecture of Chester in 1858 and Architectural antiquities of the city of Wells in 1866.

Parker was one of the chief advocates of the restoration of ecclesiastical buildings. In 1863, he and the Oxford Diocesan Architect G.E. Street revised plans for the restoration of St. Andrew's parish church, Chinnor. Parker also designed the triplet of traceried lancet windows in the chancel of St. Nicholas the Confessor, Forest Hill. His son James Parker (1832 or 1833–1912) also practiced as an architect.

Later, he devoted much attention to explorations of the history of Rome through excavations and succeeded in satisfying himself with the historical truth of much usually regarded as legendary. Two volumes of his Archaeology of Rome were published at Oxford in 1874 and 1876.

In recognition of his work, Parker was decorated by King Victor Emmanuel II of Italy and received a medal from Pope Pius IX. In 1869, he endowed the keepership of the Ashmolean Museum with a sum yielding £250 a year, and under the new arrangement, he was appointed the first keeper. In 1871, he was nominated CB.

In Italy, one of Parker's principal projects was to compose an archive collection of photographs of the city's greatest monuments from the Renaissance era onwards. Employing local photographers the collection recorded not only Rome's greatest building and works but also detailed scenes of the late 19th-century archaeological excavations. He used many of these to illustrate his books. In 1893 the entire archive perished in a fire at the Palazzo Della Porta Negroni Caffarelli depriving modern archeologists of an invaluable source of material.

Parker died in Oxford and is buried in St Sepulchre's Cemetery.

== Publications ==
- A manual of gothic mouldings, and continuous ornament
- A manual of surface ornament
- A manual of gothic stone carving
- A glossary of terms used in British heraldry. Oxford, 1847
- A Catalogue of a Series of Photographs Illustrative of the Archæology of Rome: Supplement to a catalogue... , Oxford, 1867.
- A B C of Gothic Architecture, London, 1881.

== Bibliography ==
- Brodie, Antonia; Felstead, Alison; Franklin, Jonathan; Pinfield, Leslie; Oldfield, Jane, eds. (2001). Directory of British Architects 1834–1914, A–K. London & New York: Continuum. p. 318. ISBN 0-8264-5513-1.
- Lobel, Mary D., ed. (1964). A History of the County of Oxford: Volume 8: Lewknor and Pyrton Hundreds. Victoria County History. pp. 55–80.
- Sherwood, Jennifer; Pevsner, Nikolaus (1974). Oxfordshire. The Buildings of England. Harmondsworth: Penguin Books. pp. 605–606. ISBN 0-14-071045-0.
