= Camillus de Lellis =

Italian Catholic saint (1550–1614)

Saint Camillus de Lellis M.I.
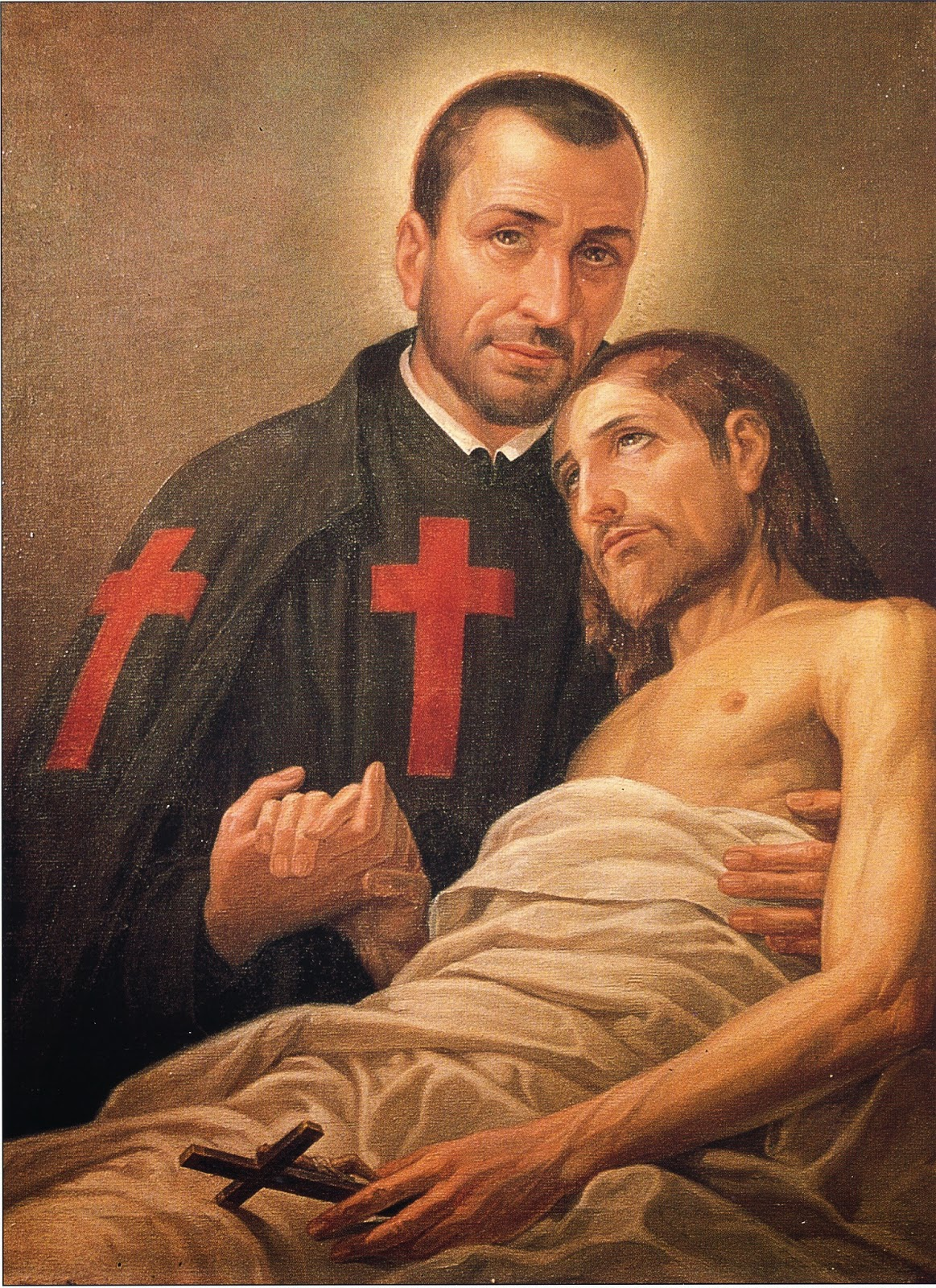
- Patron saint of the sick

Priest, Confessor, and Founder of the Camillians
- Born: 25 May 1550; Bucchianico, Chieti, Kingdom of Naples
- Died: 14 July 1614 (aged 64); Rome, Papal States
- Venerated in: Catholic Church
- Beatified: 1742, Rome, Papal States, by Pope Benedict XIV
- Canonized: 1746, Rome, Papal States, by Pope Benedict XIV
- Major shrine: Church of Santa Maria Maddalena, Rome, Italy
- Feast: 14 July; 18 July (General Roman Calendar, 1762-1969; still in the United States)
- Attributes: A Catholic priest with a large red cross on his cassock holding a sick person
- Patronage: sick; hospitals; nurses; physicians

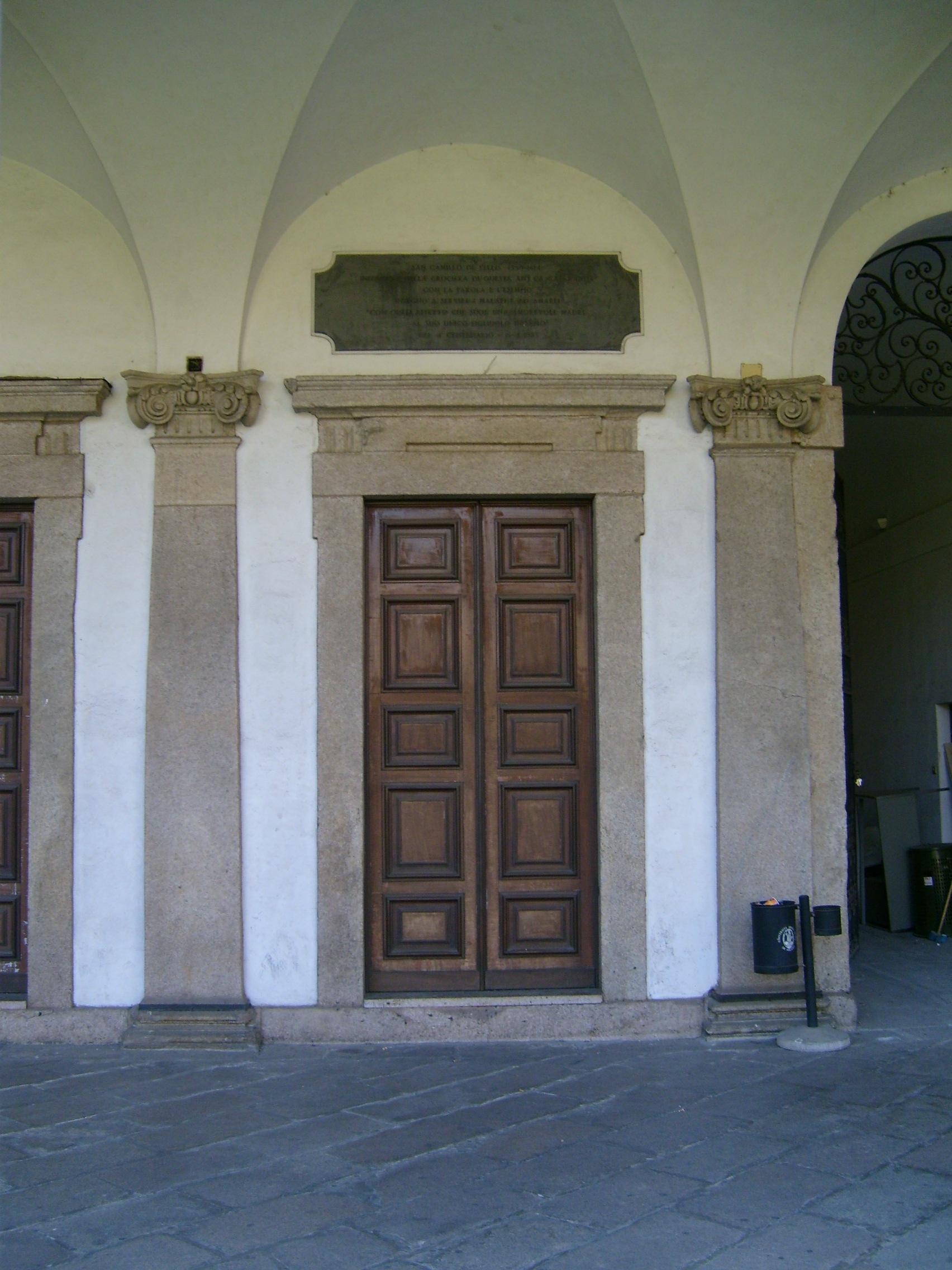
The memorial tablet in the main courtyard of the Ca' Granda, in Milan.

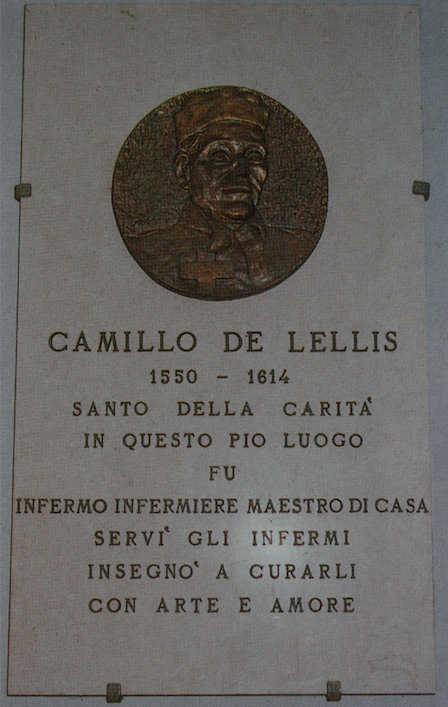
Plaque of Camillo de Lellis inside the historical Hospital of San Giacomo in Rome

Camillus de Lellis, M.I., (25 May 1550 – 14 July 1614) was an Italian Catholic priest who founded the Camillians, a religious order dedicated to the care of the sick. He was beatified by Pope Benedict XIV in the year 1742, and canonized by him four years later in 1746. De Lellis is the patron saint of the sick, hospitals, nurses and physicians. His assistance is also invoked against gambling.

== Early life ==
Camillus de Lellis was born on 25 May 1550 at Bucchianico (now in Abruzzo, then part of the Kingdom of Naples). His mother, Camilla Compelli de Laureto, was nearly sixty when she gave birth to him. His father was an officer in both the Neapolitan and French royal armies and was seldom home. De Lellis had his father's temper and, due to his mother's age and retiring nature, she felt unable to control him as he grew up. She died in 1562. As a consequence he grew up neglected by the family members who took him in after her death. Tall for his age, at the age of thirteen he began to accompany his father from one military camp to another. At sixteen, De Lellis joined his father in the Venetian army and fought in a war against the Turks.

After a number of years of military service, his regiment was disbanded in 1575. He entered Rome's San Giacomo Hospital for treatment, but was eventually turned out of the hospital because of his quarrelsome attitude. Having gambled away all his possessions, De Lellis took work as a laborer at the Capuchin friary at Manfredonia; he was constantly plagued, however, by a leg wound he received while in the army, which would not heal. Despite his aggressive nature and excessive gambling, the guardian of the friary saw a better side to his nature, and continually tried to bring that out in him. Eventually the friar's exhortations penetrated his heart and he had a religious conversion in 1575. He then entered the novitiate of the Capuchin friars. His leg wound, however, had continued to plague him and was declared incurable by the physicians, thus he was denied admission to that Order.

He then moved to Rome where he returned to San Giacomo degli Incurabili and became a caregiver at the hospital to pay for his stay. He eventually became Superintendent. He began to put things in order. In the meantime, he continued to follow a strict ascetic life, performing many penances, such as constant wearing of a hairshirt. He took as his spiritual director and confessor the popular local priest, Philip Neri, who was himself to found a religious congregation named the Congregation of the Oratory and be declared a saint.

De Lellis monitored purchases, argued with tradesmen, and returned consignments of defective goods. He began to observe the poor attention the sick received from the staff of the hospital. He was led to invite a group of pious men to express their faith through the care of the patients at the hospital. Eventually he felt called to establish a religious community for this purpose, and that he should seek Holy Orders for this task. Neri, his confessor, gave him approval for this endeavor, and a wealthy donor provided him with the income necessary to undertake his seminary studies.

He was ordained at the age of thirty-four on Pentecost of 1584 by Lord Thomas Goldwell, Bishop of St Asaph, Wales, and the last surviving Catholic bishop of Great Britain.

== Founder ==
Thus De Lellis established the Order of Clerks Regular, Ministers of the Infirm (abbreviated as M.I.), better known as the Camillians. His experience in wars led him to establish a group of health care workers who would assist soldiers on the battlefield. The large red cross on their cassock remains a symbol of the Congregation today, worn on their habits, today a universal symbol of charity and service. In 1585 his friends hired a large house for the group, where he taught them the basics of nursing care.

In 1586 Pope Sixtus V gave the group formal recognition as a congregation and assigned them the Church of St. Mary Magdalene in Rome, which they still maintain.

De Lellis' concern for the proper treatment of the sick extended to the end of their lives. He had come to be aware of the many cases of people being buried alive, due to haste, and ordered that the Brothers of his Order wait fifteen minutes past the moment when the patient seemed to have drawn his last breath, in order to avoid this.

=== Expansion ===
In 1588 he was invited to Naples, and with twelve companions founded there a new house. Certain galleys having the plague on board were forbidden to enter the harbour. The pious Servants of the sick (for that was the name they took) went on board, and attended them; on which occasion two of their number died of the pestilence. Camillus showed a like charity in Rome when a pestilential fever swept off great numbers, and again when that city was visited by a violent famine.

Pope Gregory XIV raised the Congregation to the status of an Order, equivalent with the mendicant orders, in 1591. At that time they established a fourth religious vow unique to their Order: “to serve the sick, even with danger to one's own life."

In 1594 De Lellis led his religious to Milan where they attended to the sick of the Ca' Granda, the main hospital of the city. During the Battle of Canizza in 1601, while Camillians were helping with the wounded, the tent in which they were tending to the sick and in which they had all of their equipment and supplies was completely destroyed and burned to the ground. Everything in the tent was destroyed except the red cross of a religious habit belonging to one of the Camillians who was ministering to the wounded on the battlefield. This event was taken by the Camillans to manifest divine approval of the Red Cross of St. Camillus.

Throughout his life De Lellis' ailments caused him suffering, but he allowed no one to wait on him and would crawl to visit the sick when unable to stand and walk. It is said that Camillus possessed the gifts of healing and prophecy. He resigned as Superior General of the Order in 1607, but continued to serve as Vicar General of the Order. By that time, communities of the Order had spread all throughout Italy and as far as Hungary. He assisted in a General Chapter of the Order in 1613, after which he accompanied the new Superior General on an inspection tour of all the hospitals of the Order in Italy. In the course of that tour, he fell ill. He died in Rome in 1614, and was entombed at the Church of St. Mary Magdalene.

== Veneration ==
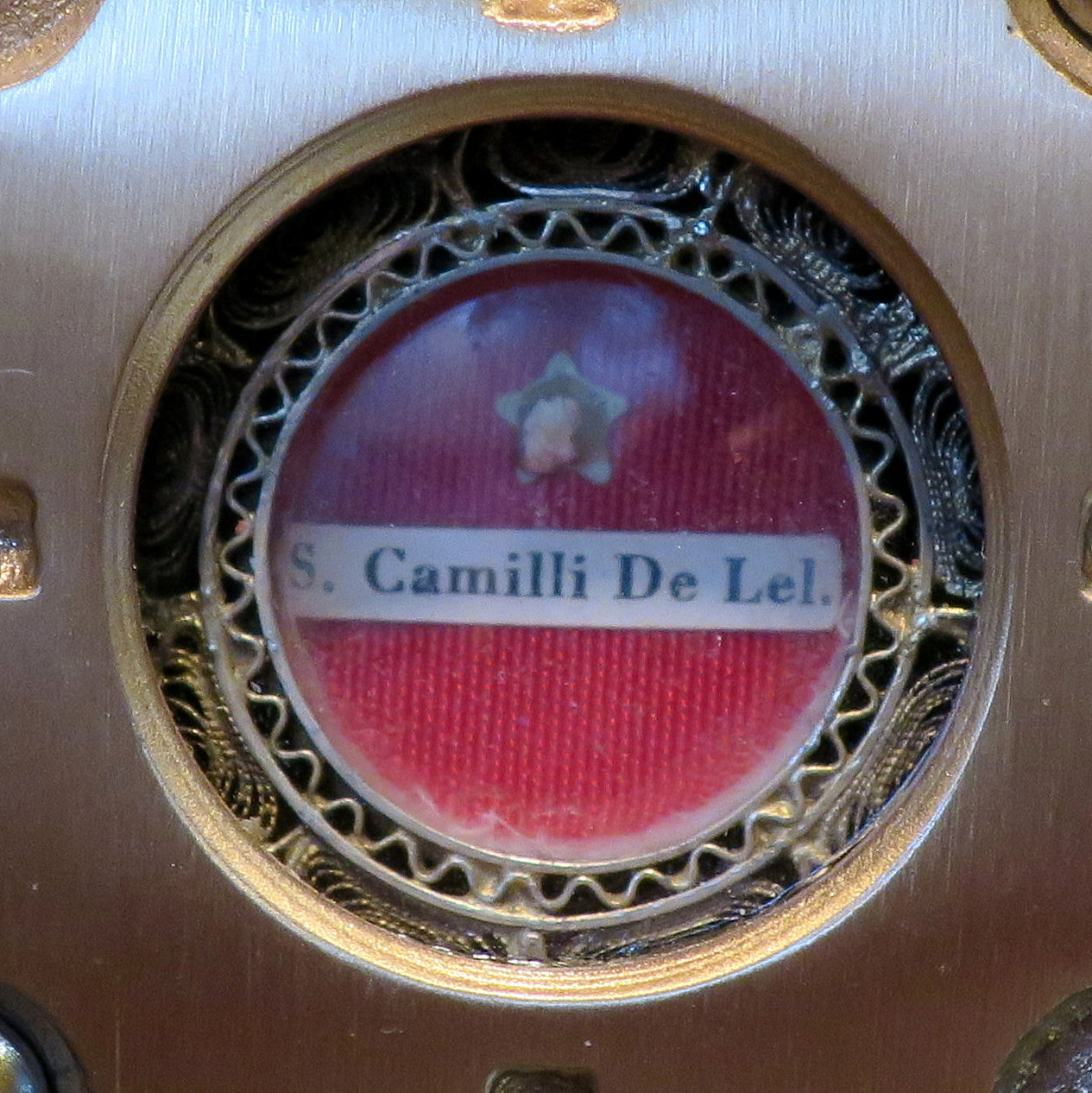
A relic of De Lellis displayed for veneration at a church in Michigan.

De Lellis was beatified by Pope Benedict XIV in the year 1742, and canonized by him four years later in 1746.

In 1886, Pope Leo XIII proclaimed him patron of all hospitals and of the sick. In 1930, Pope Pius XI named him co-patron, with Saint John of God of nurses and nursing associations. His assistance is also invoked against gambling.

His mortal remains are located in the altar in the Church of St. Mary Magdalene in Rome, along with several of his relics. Also on display is the Cross which allegedly spoke to Camillus, and asked him, "Why are you afraid? Do you not realize that this is not your work but mine?" which has become the motto associated with De Lellis, as well as healthcare workers who were inspired by him.

The Congregation of the Servants of the Sick of St Camillus, the Daughters of St. Camillus, the Secular Institutes of Missionaries of the Sick Christ Our Hope, of the Kamillianische Schwestern (Camillan Sisters) and of the Lay Camillian Family, were born later of the charism and spirituality of De Lellis.

Camillus' feast day was originally inserted in the General Roman Calendar in 1762 for celebration on 18 July, since 14 July, the day of his death, was at that time taken by the feast of Saint Bonaventure. It was then given the rank of Double; later, it was changed in 1960 to that of "Third-Class Feast", and in the liturgical changes of 1969 to that of an optional "Memorial", when it was also moved to the anniversary of his death, 14 July. In the U.S.A. it is currently an optional Memorial celebrated on 18 July, because on 14 July there is the Memorial of Kateri Tekakwitha.

Camillus is depicted ministering to the sick.

== Commemoration ==
Camillus is honoured in the names of: St. Camillus, a church in the village of Farrelton, Quebec

- San Camillo de Lellis, a church in Rome, Italy
- São Camilo de Lellis, a church in Vitória, Espírito Santo, Brazil
- The Camillians religious order, including the Daughters of St. Camillus
- The town Saint-Camille, Quebec and the parish Saint-Camille-de-Lellis, Quebec
- Saint Camillus Academy, former Catholic school in Kentucky, USA
- St Camille Association, providing residential care for people in West Africa suffering from mental illness
- St. Camillus Centre in Mohale's Hoek, Lesotho
- St. Camillus College of Manaoag in Northern Luzon, Philippines
- Saint Camillus Foundation, a charitable organization in Thailand, including the Camillian social center in Rayong
- St. Camillus Health Center, a skilled nursing facility located in Massachusetts, USA
- Camillian Hospital, a general hospital located in Bangkok, Thailand
- Saint Camillus Medical Center, in Hurst, Texas
- United Doctors of St. Camillus de Lellis Hospital, Batangas City, Philippines
- St. Camillus College of Manaoag Foundation, Inc., a non-profit, non-stock private school in Manaoag, Pangasinan, Philippines
- Camillian Family Foundation Philippines
- The Centers at St. Camillus, a rehabilitation and nursing home facility in Syracuse, New York
- St. Camillus Hall, the cardiac telemetry unit at Holy Family Hospital, Methuen, Massachusetts, USA
- St. Camillus Health Center, a nursing home and ancillaries clinic in Milwaukee, Wisconsin, USA
- St. Camillus Hospital, Limerick, Ireland
- The Saint Camillus International University of Health and Medical Sciences, Rome, Italy

== See also ==
- Scapular of Help of the Sick
- Saint Camillus, patron saint archive
