= Daughters of St. Camillus =

The Daughters of St. Camillus (Italian: Figlie di San Camillo; Latin: Congregatio Filiarum Sancti Camilli; abbreviation: F.S.C.) is a religious institute of pontifical right whose members profess public vows of chastity, poverty, and obedience and follow the evangelical way of life in common. They dedicate themselves for nursing of the sick and elderly.

This religious institute was founded 1892 at Rome, Italy, by Luigi Tezza and Giuditta Vannini, who assumed the name of "mother Giuseppina", for the corporal and spiritual assistance of those whose suffering puts their life at risk. The sisters make a fourth vow of service to the poor. Camillus de Lellis is the patron saint and his spirituality is followed by this congregation. The institute received pontifical status in 1922.

The sisters have houses in Africa, Asia, Europe and Latin America. The Generalate of the Congregation can be found in Grottaferrata, Italy.

On 31 December 2005 there are 823 sisters in 97 communities.
