= Saint Camillus Foundation =

Thai charitable organization

The Saint Camillus Foundation of Thailand is a charitable organization in Thailand, set up and run by the Camillian monastic order.

In 1995, the foundation, with the participation of an Italian priest Father Giovanni Contarin, established a Camillian Social Centre in the Rayong Province. The center was built to provide shelter and care to homeless, indigent, and rejected people living with HIV/AIDS. Special emphasis was placed on women and children, as they were most vulnerable.

Saint Camillus Foundation also operates Camillian Social Center Sampran, caring for elders; Camillian Social Center Prachinburi, caring for lepers; Camillian Social Center Chantaburi, caring for elders; Camillian Social Center Chiangrai, caring for tribal children; and two hospitals, including Camillian Hospital in Bangkok and San Camillo Hospital in Ban Pong, Ratchaburi Province.
