= Palazzo Della Porta Negroni Caffarelli =

Coordinates: 41.90512°N 12.48002°E

This Palazzo should not be confused with the Palazzo Caffarelli-Clementino, the Palazzo Viddoni Caffarelli or the Palazzo Aragona Gonzaga Negroni Galitzin, also in Rome.

Palazzo Della Porta Negroni Caffarelli is a large townhouse located at Via Condotti 61, Rome. It was originally built in the 17th century. However, it was completely rebuilt for the Negroni family in 1865. In style, built around a central courtyard, the building resembles the Renaissance palazzi of the 16th century.

The palazzo owes its double name not so much to frequent changes of ownership, as is generally the case with Italian palazzi, but to the multiple titles of the Negroni. Its builder, Don Giuseppe, Conte Negroni, later became Duke Caffarelli. The family titles also included the Dukedom of d’Assergi. The Duke died in 1882 and was succeeded by his son, Duke Francesco Di Paola Negroni Caffarelli. The Della Porta were an old patrician family who owned the original palazzo on the site.

In 1893, the palazzo was damaged by fire. During the blaze, an important archive of photographic negatives accumulated by the architectural writer John Henry Parker was destroyed along with an archive of a famous Roman photographer, Pompeo Molins.

Today, like those of many other Roman palazzi, the ground floor is occupied by shops and boutiques.

== Notes ==
- Monumenti Roma Retrieved 29 April 2010.
- American Academy in Rome Retrieved 29 April 2010.
- Retrieved 23 May 2019
