= Antico Caffè Greco =

Café in Rome, Italy

Coordinates: 41°54′20″N 12°28′53″E

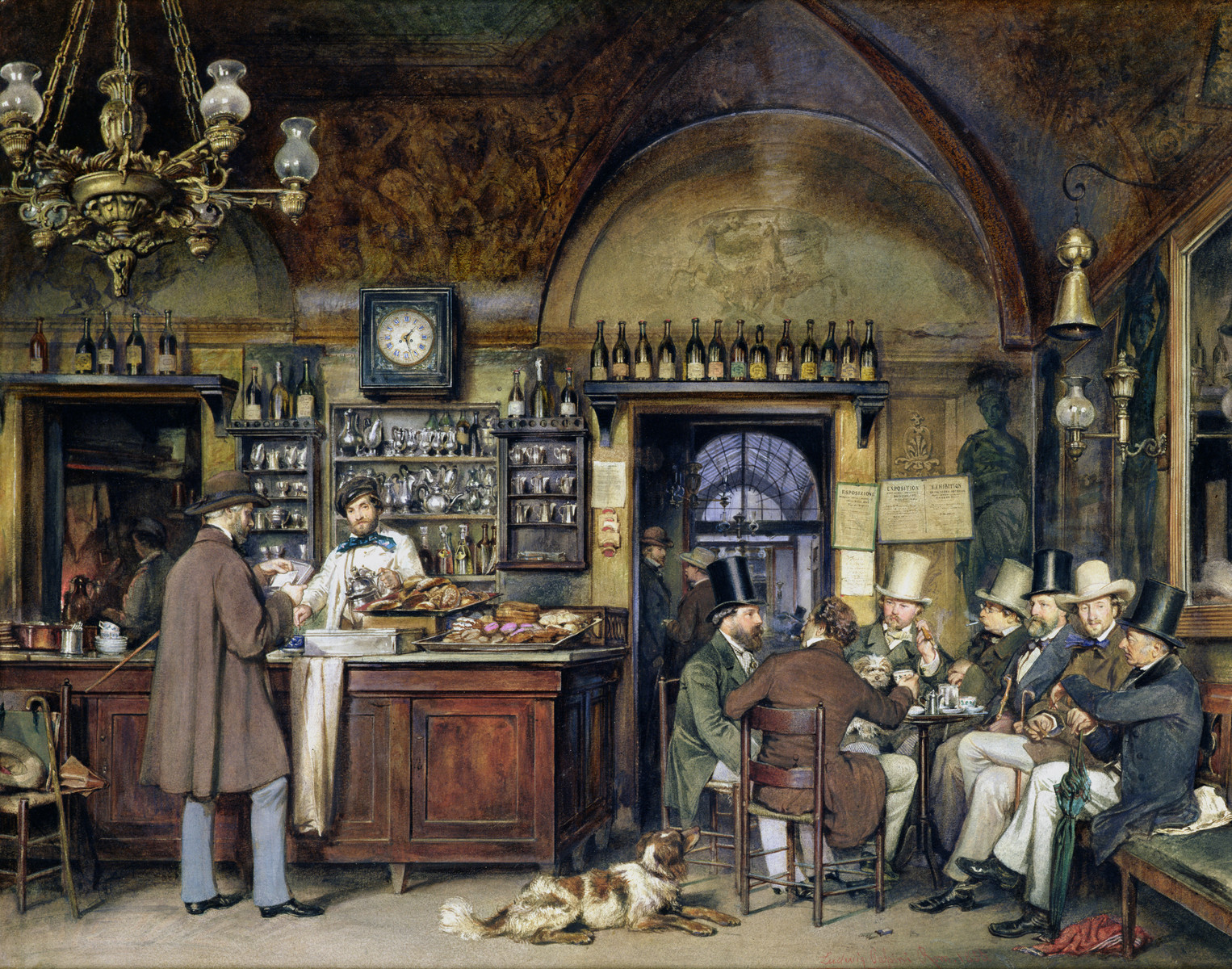
Ludwig Passini - Cafe Greco in Rome

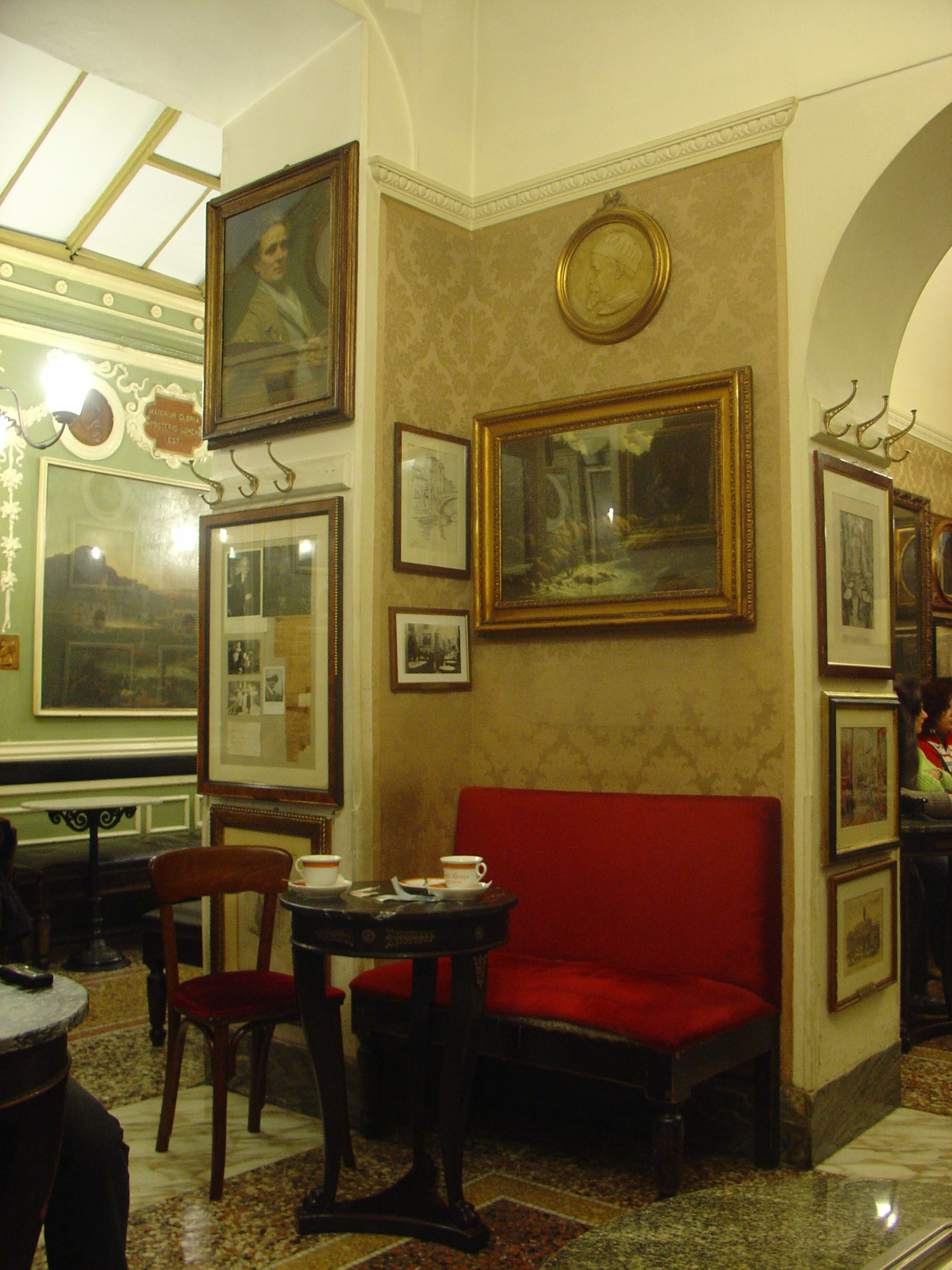
Caffè Greco

The Antico Caffè Greco (pronounced [anˈtiːko kafˌfɛ ɡˈɡrɛːko]; transl. "Old Greek Café"), sometimes simply referred to as Caffè Greco, was a historic landmark café which opened in 1760 on Via Condotti no. 86 in Rome, Italy. It was the oldest coffehouse in Rome and second oldest in Italy, after Caffè Florian in Venice.

== History ==
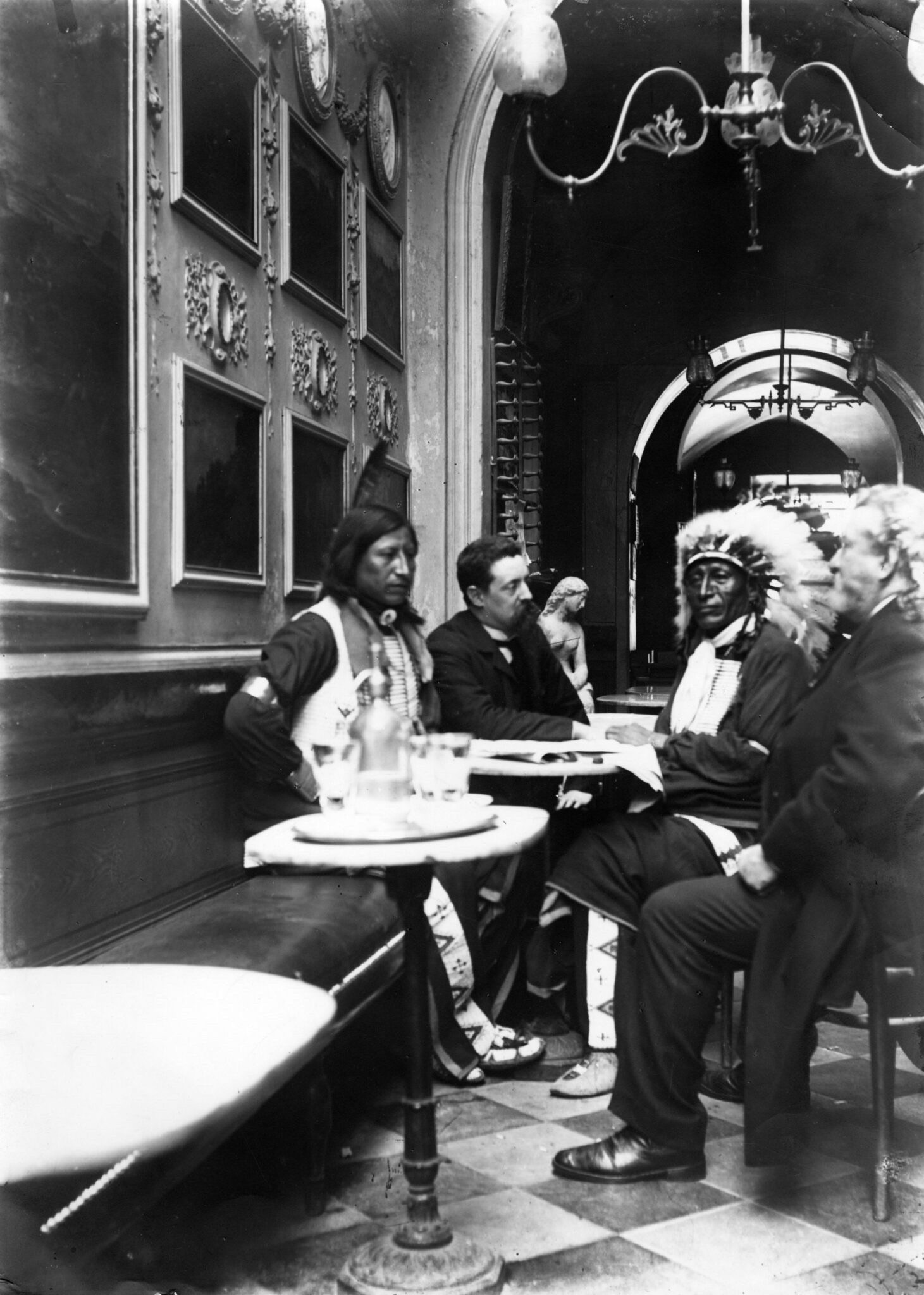
Buffalo Bill, Sitting Bull, Black Elk and the italian journalist and writer Diego Angeli at the Caffè Greco on February 1890, during the italian tour of the Wild West Show.

It was opened in 1760 by Nicola di Madalena or Della Maddalena, a member of the Greek community in Italy.

It houses an artistic collection comprising over three hundred items—including memorabilia and artworks such as paintings, drawings, and sculptures—some donated and others commissioned from artists who frequented and formed a bond with this place over the years. These works are displayed across the café’s nine rooms, retaining their original placement in most instances.

Historic figures who frequented the Caffè Greco including: Stendhal, Johann Wolfgang von Goethe, Arthur Schopenhauer, Bertel Thorvaldsen, Mariano Fortuny, Lord George Gordon Byron, Georges Bizet, Hector Berlioz, Johannes Brahms, Franz Liszt, John Keats, Henrik Ibsen, Hans Christian Andersen, Felix Mendelssohn, James Joyce, Gabriele D'Annunzio, François-René de Chateaubriand, Orson Welles, Mark Twain, Friedrich Nietzsche, Buffalo Bill, Thomas Mann, Jean-Auguste-Dominique Ingres, Nikolaj Vasil'evič Gogol', Edvard Grieg, Antonio Canova, Harriet Hosmer, Giorgio De Chirico, Guillaume Apollinaire, Charles Baudelaire, Richard Wagner, Carlo Levi, María Zambrano, Lev Tolstoj, Lawrence Ferlinghetti, Fyodor Dostoevsky, Frederic Chopin, Aldo Palazzeschi, Ennio Flaiano, Claude Debussy, Audrey Hepburn and even Giacomo Casanova have had coffee there. Cyprian Norwid was described as one of the cafe's regulars.

For more than two centuries and a half, the Caffè Greco has remained a haven for writers, politicians, artists and notable people as Georgios Paganelis in Rome. In 2017, the owner of the building (the Israelite Hospital in Rome) asked for a raise of its monthly rent from the current 18,000 to 120,000 Euros. A court ruling determined that it could be closed down but in early 2025, the Ministry of Culture stepped in and offered to work towards a mediated settlement to ensure the survival of the cafe. However, the Caffè Greco permanently closed in October 8, 2025, since the owner of the building won the legal dispute.

== See also ==
- Caffè Michelangiolo
- Babington's tea room
