= Giuditta Vannini =

Italian religious sister and saint

Saint Giuditta Vannini
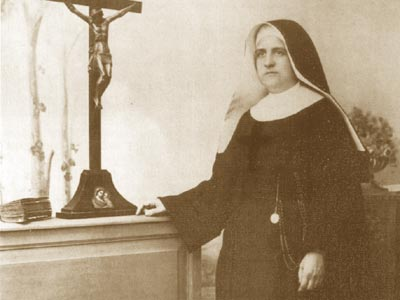

Virgin
- Born: Giuditta Adelaide Agata Vannini; 7 July 1859; Rome, Papal States
- Died: 23 February 1911 (aged 51); Rome, Kingdom of Italy
- Venerated in: Roman Catholic Church
- Beatified: 16 October 1994, Saint Peter's Square, Vatican City by Pope John Paul II
- Canonized: 13 October 2019, Saint Peter's Square, Vatican City by Pope Francis
- Feast: 23 February
- Patronage: Daughters of St. Camillus

Giuditta Vannini (7 July 1859 – 23 February 1911) – also known as Giuseppina – was an Italian religious sister. Together with Luigi Tezza she established the religious congregation known as the Daughters of Saint Camillus. She and her two siblings were orphaned as children and were placed in different homes; she was raised and educated in Rome under nuns where her vocation to the religious life was strengthened. Vannini later tried joining a religious order but was forced to leave during her novitiate period after suffering from ill health. She and Tezza met in 1891 and founded a religious congregation of which Vannini served as Superior General until her death while Tezza was exiled to Peru around 1900.

Her beatification process opened in the 1950s, though its formal introduction came in the late 1970s at which point she became titled as a Servant of God; she became titled as Venerable in 1992 upon papal confirmation of her heroic virtue. Pope John Paul II presided over Vannini's beatification on 16 October 1994. Pope Francis confirmed her canonization in mid-2019 and canonized her as a saint in Saint Peter's Square on 13 October 2019.

== Life ==
Giuditta Vannini was the second of three children to the cook Angelo Vannini and Annunziata Papi; her two siblings were Giulia and Augusto. Her baptism was celebrated on 8 July in the Basilica di Sant'Andrea delle Fratte and she was given the baptismal names "Giuditta Adelaide Agata". The children were orphaned after her father died on 18 August 1863 when she was four (from a sudden and severe intestinal blockage in Ariccia) and her mother when she was seven (her mother remarried on 11 May 1865 but died on 6 November 1866); she was also separated from her siblings when she was sent to the Torlonia orphanage at Via Sant'Onofrio in Rome under the guidance of the Vincentian Sisters until 1883. Her brother was sent to live with their maternal uncle Gioacchino Papi while her sister was sent to the Sisters of Saint Joseph. Both her First Communion and Confirmation were celebrated on 19 March 1873. Vannini obtained a diploma as a kindergarten teacher but settled instead on the religious life.

Vannini entered the Vincentian Sisters on 3 March 1883 to become a religious sister and commenced her novitiate in Siena; she was forced to leave due to ill health in 1887. Vannini had returned to Rome to recuperate and then in 1888 decided to resume her religious formation. But after she returned to Siena the congregati rejected her because she had been deemed unsuitable for formation. It was sometime later that she would meet Luigi Tezza (in a confessional when she sought his advice) on 17 December 1891 at the end of a spiritual retreat she was attending; Tezza desired the establishment of an all-female religious congregation dedicated to caring for the sick and dying, and asked if Vannini would be interested in joining him. Vannini accepted Tezza's offer after discerning and reflecting on her vocation on 2 February 1892 and the two began to form a group of other women to serve as the basis for their congregation. The decisive moment came on 19 March 1892 when she and two companions received the religious habit of the Camillian tertiaries and on 19 March 1893 made her first vows and took the religious name Giuseppina. She made her perpetual vows on 8 December 1895 after she established with Tezza the Daughters of St. Camillus and she was made its Superior General. Her profession was made in private since her initial application for ecclesiastical approval of the order had been rejected.

But she and Tezza faced difficulties soon after when Pope Leo XIII decided not to allow for the opening of new religious congregations around 1900 added with the unjust slander directed at Tezza which led to the Cardinal Vicar of Rome Pietro Respighi sending him to Lima in Peru in 1900 to exercise his pastoral mission there. This new development prompted for the leadership of the order to fall to Vannini alone and she would maintain correspondence with Tezza until her death. The congregation received formal approval from Respighi on 21 June 1909 as an order of diocesan right.

In 1910 she visited the congregation's Italian houses and those in France before suffering from heart disease. Vannini died during the evening on 23 February 1911 in her bed in Rome from heart disease; her remains were interred in Rome but later relocated to the order's motherhouse in Grottaferrata. The congregation received the decree of praise on 25 February 1922 from Pope Pius XI and received papal approval from Pius XI a decade later on 17 June 1931. In late 2005 there are 823 religious in a total of 97 houses in places in Europe such as Poland and Portugal. The congregation also operates in Latin America in countries such as Argentina and Mexico and also operates in Africa in Benin and Burkina Faso.

== Beatification process ==
The diocesan process for the beatification process commenced on 8 June 1955 and ended on 20 December 1956. Her spiritual writings were all collected and investigated while forming an essential part of the process as being a vital component to investigating her virtues and her religious life; the decree on her writings was signed on 22 March 1961. The formal introduction of the cause – which titled Vannini as a Servant of God – came on 15 December 1977. The positio – containing biographical details and championing her cause – was submitted to the Congregation for the Causes of Saints in Rome in 1988. Pope John Paul II declared Vannini to be venerable on 7 March 1992 on the account of her life of heroic virtue.

Her beatification depended upon papal confirmation of a miraculous healing attributed to her intercession that neither science or medicine could explain. The miracle required was investigated in the diocese that it originated in and the C.C.S. validated that process on 20 December 1985. The panel of medical experts (not all of them Catholic) met and approved the healing as having no scientific or medical explanation on 16 March 1993; theologians approved it as well, on 4 June 1993, as having occurred due to Vannini's intercession. The C.C.S. itself also approved the healing as a legitimate miracle on 5 October 1993 and passed it onto the pope, who approved it on 23 December 1993. John Paul II celebrated her beatification on 16 October 1994 (it was celebrated during the Ninth General Assembly of the Synod of Bishops on the theme of consecrated life in the world).

The second and final miracle required for her to be canonized was investigated in the Sinop diocese in Brazil from 1 to 4 December 2015 before the information collected was transmitted to the C.C.S. in Rome for evaluation later that month; it involved the cure of a construction worker. Medical experts approved the miracle on 27 September 2018 as did theologians on 19 February 2019 and the C.C.S. members just a couple of months later on 7 May. Pope Francis signed the decree recognizing the healing in question as a miracle on 13 May 2019 that enabled for Vannini to be canonized. The pope convened a gathering of cardinals on 1 July 2019 to schedule the date for the canonization. The Pope canonized her in Saint Peter's Square on 13 October 2019.

The postulator for the cause is Bernadette Rosoni; the postulator before that was Gabriella Marzio.
