= Camillian Hospital =

Hospital in Bangkok, Thailand

Coordinates: 13.739338°N 100.583755°E

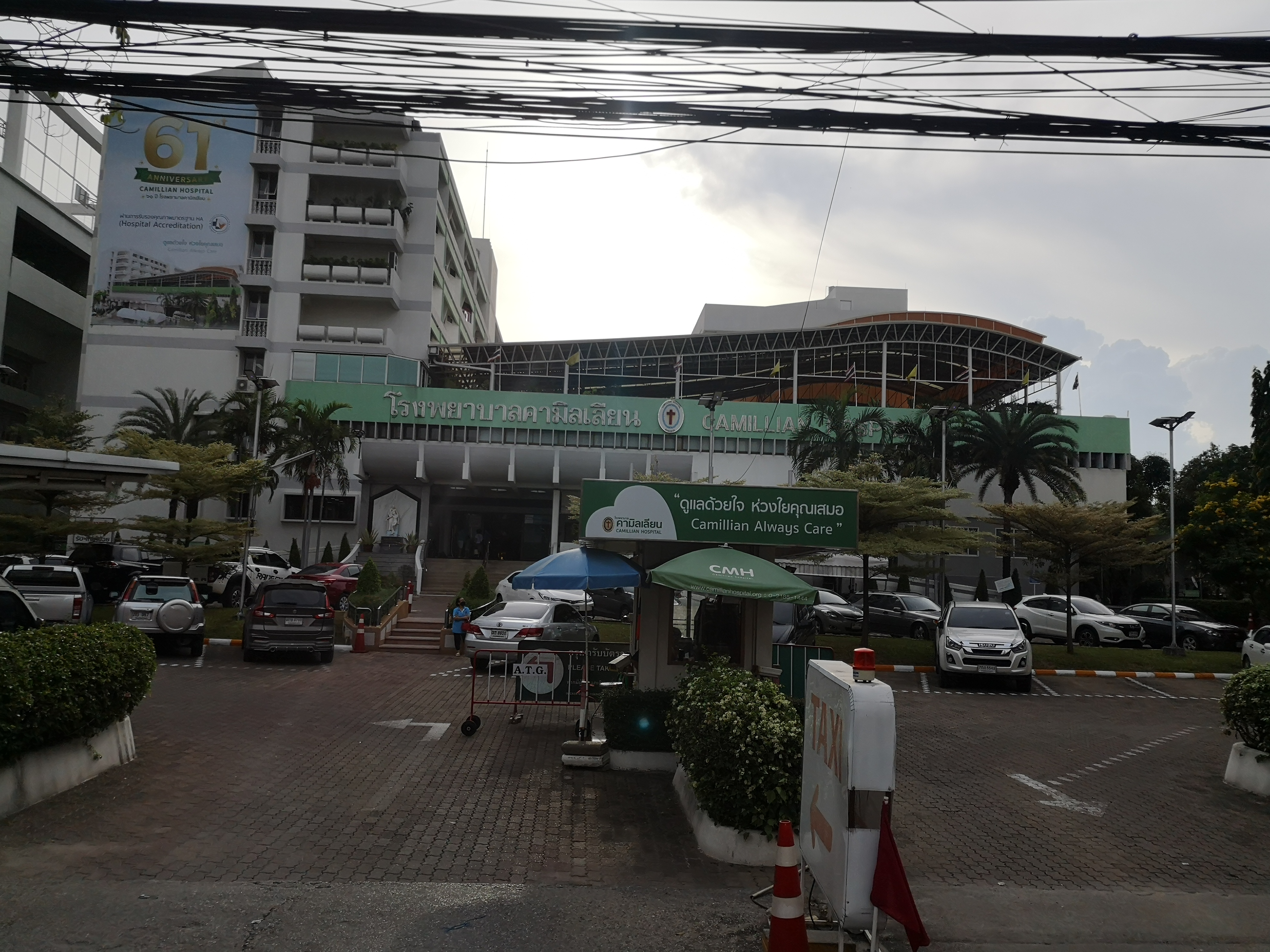
Camillian Hospital

Camillian Hospital (called also "San Camillo Hospital") - small private hospital in Bangkok (Thailand), founded by catholic missionaries - camillians in 1956 (earlier in 1952 camillians established another "San Camillo Hospital" in Ratchaburi Province). The hospital is located in Watthana district and has general practice and special care facilities.

The hospital is operated by Saint Camillus Foundation of Thailand and has charity programs to treat poor and low income patients.

Camillian hospital employees took active part in overcoming of the 2004 tsunami damage in Thailand setting up mobile clinics for the disaster survivors.

Camillian Hospital appears a few times in the movie Kickboxer with Jean-Claude Van Damme in 1989.
