= Enrico Rebuschini =

Italian Roman Catholic priest

Blessed Enrico Rebuschini M.I.
- insert a caption here Blessed Enrico Rebuschini

Priest
- Born: 25 April 1860; Gravedona, Como, Kingdom of Italy
- Died: 10 May 1938 (aged 78); Cremona, Kingdom of Italy
- Venerated in: Roman Catholic Church
- Beatified: 4 May 1997, Saint Peter's Square, Vatican City by Pope John Paul II
- Canonized: 4 November 1997
- Feast: 10 May
- Attributes: Priest's cassock
- Patronage: Against depression

Enrico Rebuschini (25 April 1860 – 10 May 1938) was an Italian Roman Catholic priest and professed member of the Camillians. Rebuschini was marked since his childhood as one who had an innate desire to tend to the poor and marginalized and felt the need to hand out his possessions to those less fortunate than himself. But his father opposed his vocation to the priesthood and directed him to studies which he threw himself into in obedience to him. But he felt dissatisfied upon working with his brother-in-law in the silk business and made a final plea to his father to become a priest. His father relented and he commenced his ecclesial studies though in his life afterwards experienced several profound episodes of nervous depression that caused him to grow ill each time.

Rebuschini died in the odor of holiness and had been renowned after his death as a saint which had led to calls for the launch of a beatification process. The cause did indeed open sometime later and culminated in 1997 with his beatification in Saint Peter's Square by Pope John Paul II.

== Early life ==
Enrico Rebuschini was born on 25 April 1860 in Gravedona in Como as the second of five children to Domenico Rebuschini and Sophia Polti. His father was a head tax inspector for the Como province and did not favor religion. He often accompanied his wife to the church but remained outside each time. His mother and maternal aunt were active in parish activities. Rebuschini was baptized on 1 May as "Enrico Pietro Battista".

From his childhood he had the inclination to do whatever he could for the poor and vulnerable; his call to the priesthood came in his childhood but was something that his father was opposed to. He began his studies at the college in Pavia in mathematics but left soon after due to the anti-clerical environment. He enlisted in the armed forces but later left it to complete his diploma in accounting. In Milan he studied for the armed forces and his superiors held him in such high regard that he was encouraged to pursue a career in that field; he had emerged from training as a reserve second lieutenant. But he opted to pursue accounting and so graduated as such in 1882 after having obtained his diploma with honors. Rebuschini worked at his brother-in-law's (his sister Dorina's husband) silk warehouse for sometime (1882–84) though later left upon realizing that his path was the ecclesial one.

== Priesthood ==
In summer 1884 he had long discussions with his father with Luigi Guanella mediating in which his father at last relented and allowed him to enter the priesthood.

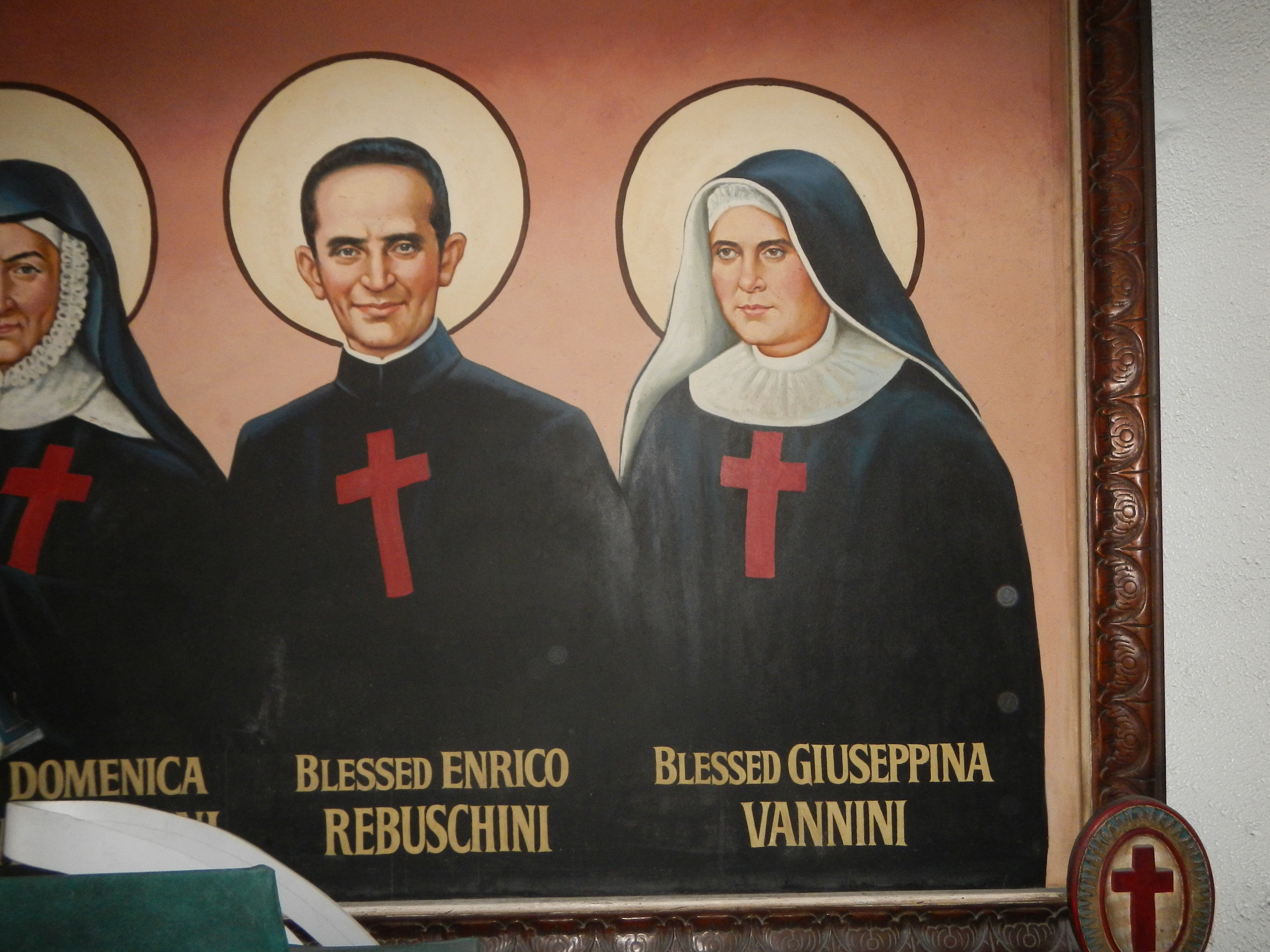
Depiction in Makati

He then set himself on his ecclesial studies and was later sent to the Pontifical Gregorian in Rome to pursue ecclesiastical studies in 1884. In late 1885 his parents and aunt Magdalena came to Rome for a visit and saw him peace and calm. His aunt noted: "Enrico is content and at peace". But in March 1886 he was so overcome with nervous depression and became ill to the point that he had to return home in order to recover. But once he recovered in May 1887 (after spending a brief stint in a clinic) he resumed his studies and set on embarking on a life of rigorous asceticism after reexamining his call to the priesthood.

Rebuschini later entered the Camillians on 27 September 1887 and commenced his period of the novitiate in Verona prior to receiving his ordination as a priest on 14 April 1889 from the Bishop of Mantua Giuseppe Melchiorre Sarto – the future Pope Pius X. He made his perpetual profession on 8 December 1891. From 1889 to 1899 he ministered to the sick in Verona and worked there as a hospital chaplain from 1891 to 1899 before serving in the same position though in Cremona from 1899 onwards. From 21 December 1903 until his death he ministered in a clinic and nursing home. From 1890 to 1891 he suffered another bout of depression and again in 1895 after being appointed as a professor and vice-novice master. From 1903 until 1937 he served as the administrator for the new San Camillo Clinic and for a decade from 12 March 1912 to 1922 served as the superior of his house. He suffered his final depression for a few months in 1922.

== Death ==
Rebuschini died at 5:30am 10 May 1938 due to pneumonia after having celebrated Mass for an ill person on 23 April. He had come home feeling unwell and was confined to bed with a severe cold on 25 April that became pneumonia. On 8 May he asked for the Anointing of the Sick. On 9 May the priest Vanti celebrated Mass in his room and it was the last time that Rebuschini would receive the Eucharist. His funeral and burial were held on 12 May.

== Beatification ==
The beatification process opened in the Cremona diocese on 3 October 1947 in an informative process of investigation that concluded a decade later on 28 July 1958; theologians approved his spiritual writings on 23 January 1963 as having adhered to traditional doctrine rather than in contravention of it. The formal introduction of the cause did not come until 15 March 1980 while an apostolic process of investigation was later held from 1 January 1981 until its closure later on 28 July 1983. The Congregation for the Causes of Saints validated these two processes on 12 June 1987 before receiving the Positio for evaluation in 1990. Theologians approved the cause on 14 February 1995 as did the C.C.S. later that 4 July. Pope John Paul II declared Rebuschini to be Venerable on 11 July 1995 after having confirmed that the late priest had lived a model life of heroic virtue.

The miracle needed for his beatification was investigated in the diocese it originated in before the C.C.S. validated that diocesan process on 4 March 1994. Medical experts confirmed its miraculous nature on 6 July 1995 as did theologians on 19 January 1996 and the C.C.S. members later that 2 April. On 25 June the pope also confirmed it and announced Rebuschini's beatification. The pope beatified Rebuschini in Saint Peter's Square on 4 May 1997.

The current postulator for this cause is the Camillian priest Luigi Secchi.
