= Via Condotti =

Thoroughfare in Rome, Italy

Coordinates: 41.9051°N 12.4805°E

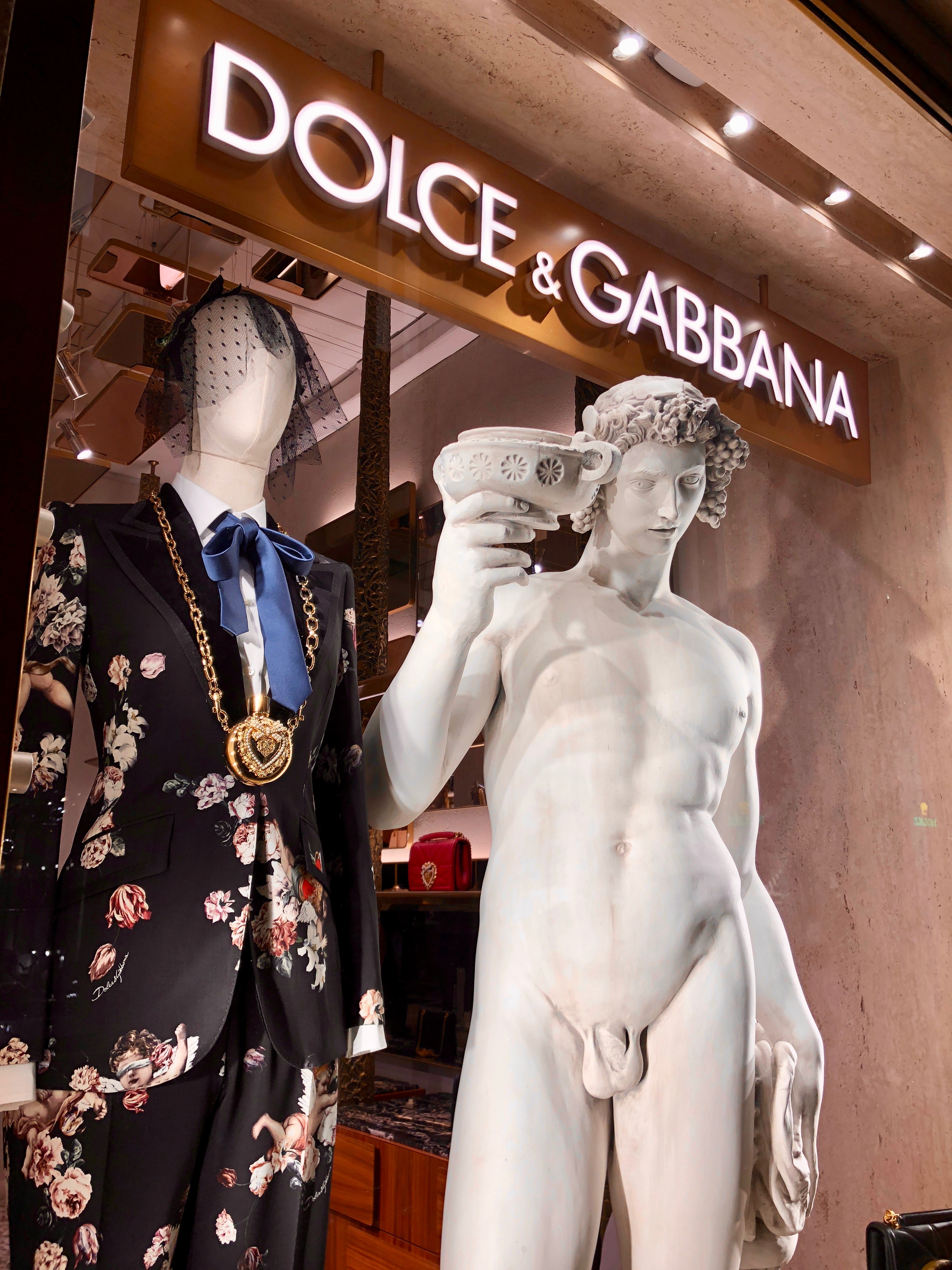
Dolce & Gabbana, Via dei Condotti

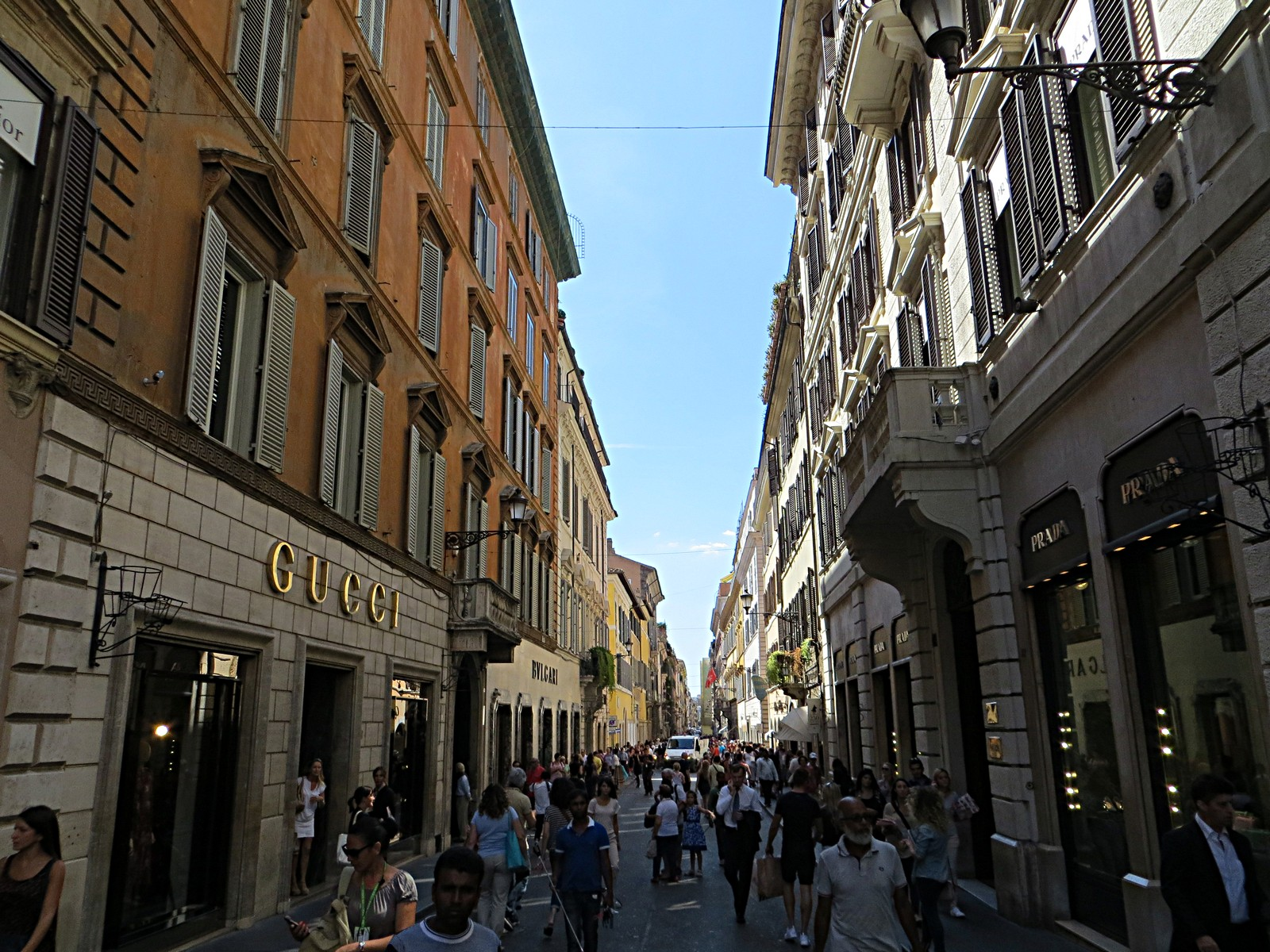
View of Via dei Condotti

Via dei Condotti, also known as Via Condotti, is a busy and elegant street in the heart of Rome. Often referred to as Italy’s Rodeo Drive, it is the home of the country's most famous fashion houses, including Versace, Gucci, and Dolce & Gabbana. Their Rome flagship boutiques are located here, showcasing the finest examples of Italian craftsmanship, style, and elegance. In ancient Roman times, it was one of the roads that crossed the Via Flaminia, allowing people who had crossed the Tiber River to reach the Pincio Hill. The street begins at the foot of the Spanish Steps and takes its name from the conduits (condotti) that once carried water to the Baths of Agrippa. Situated in the Tridente district, Via Condotti connects Via del Corso with Piazza di Spagna, and is regarded as one of the most expensive streets in Europe, where luxury shopping blends seamlessly with the city’s timeless history and culture.

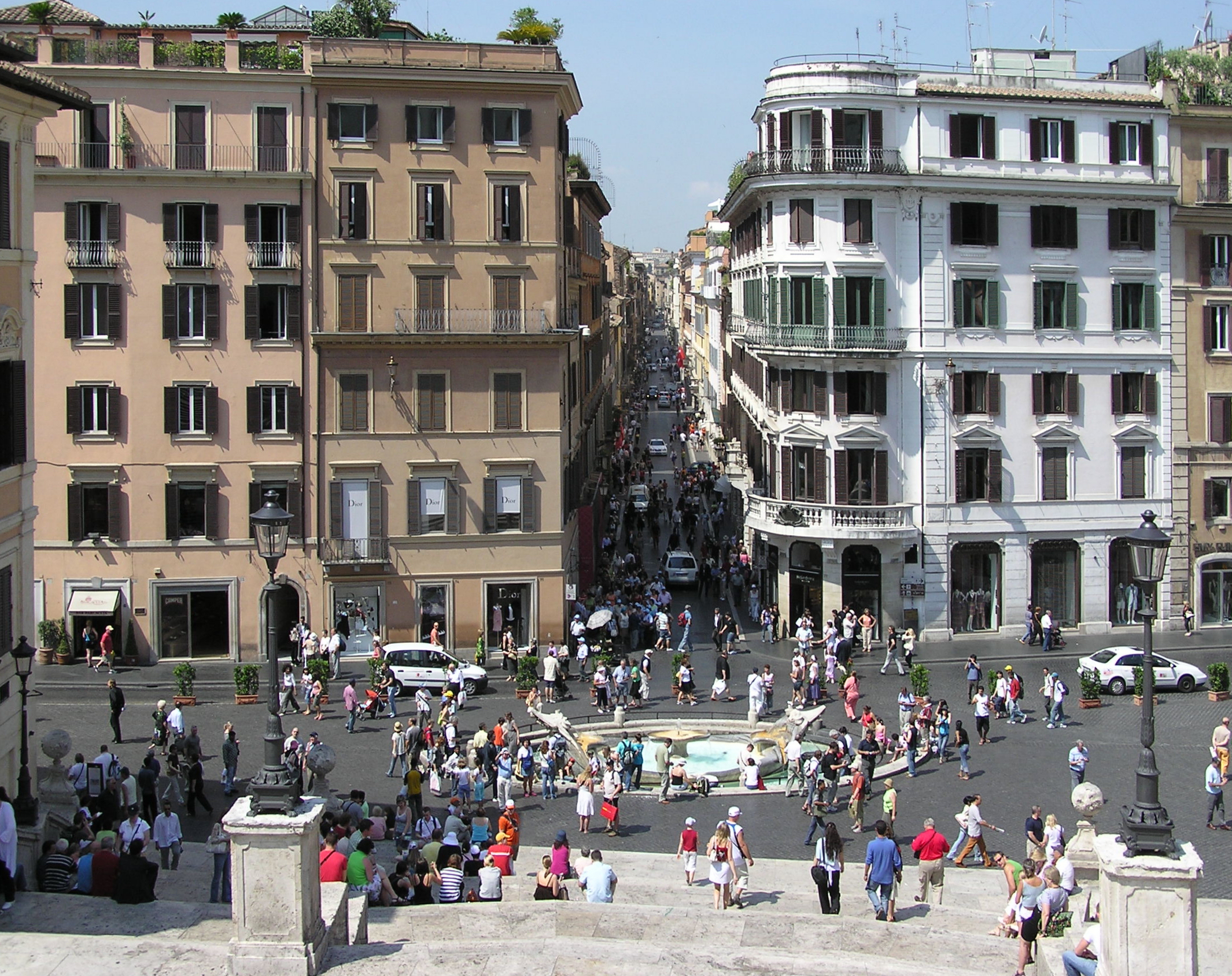
Via Condotti from the Spanish Steps

Caffè Greco (or Antico Caffè Greco), perhaps the most famous café in Rome, was established at Via dei Condotti 86 in 1760, and attracted figures such as Stendhal, Goethe, Byron, Liszt and Keats to have coffee there. Guglielmo Marconi, inventor of radio, lived at Via dei Condotti 11, until his death in 1937.

Being near the Spanish steps, the street is visited by large numbers of tourists. In May 1986, fashion designer Valentino filed suit to close a McDonald's shortly after it opened near the Spanish steps, complaining of "noise and disgusting odours" below his six-story palazzo in the vicinity of Via Condotti. But to the dismay of some Romans, McDonald's overcame the obstacles and is successful.

Via Condotti is a center of fashion shopping in Rome. Dior, Gucci, Valentino, Hermès, Armani, Jimmy Choo, Rolex, Tudor, Patek Philippe, Prada, Salvatore Ferragamo, Celine, Van Cleef & Arpels, Dolce & Gabbana, Max Mara, Alberta Ferretti, Trussardi, Buccellati, Bulgari, Damiani, Tod's, Zegna, Cartier, Montblanc, Tiffany & Co., Louis Vuitton have stores on Via Condotti. Others, such as Laura Biagiotti, have their offices there.

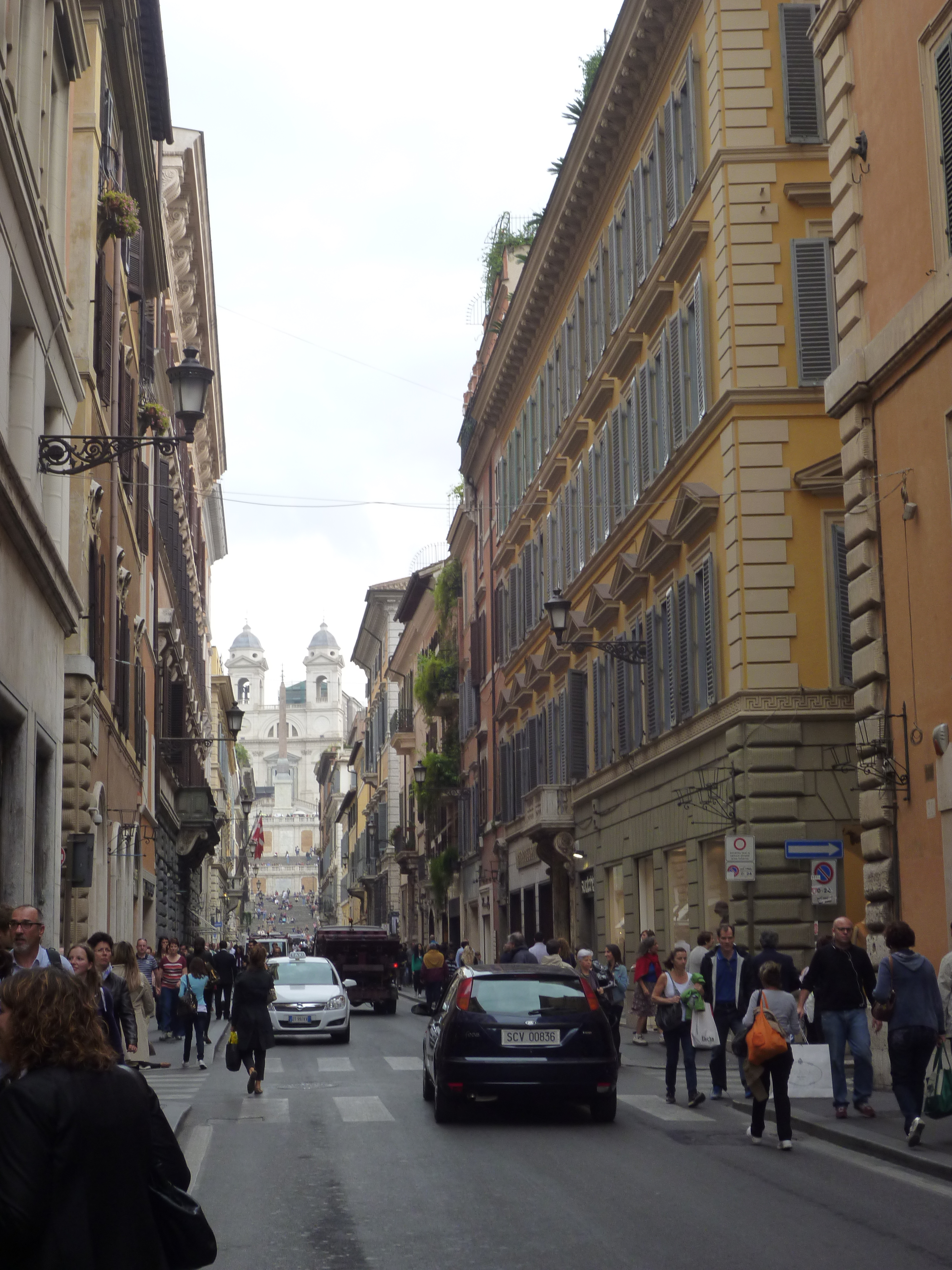
The street looking towards the Spanish Steps

== Monuments and sights of interest ==
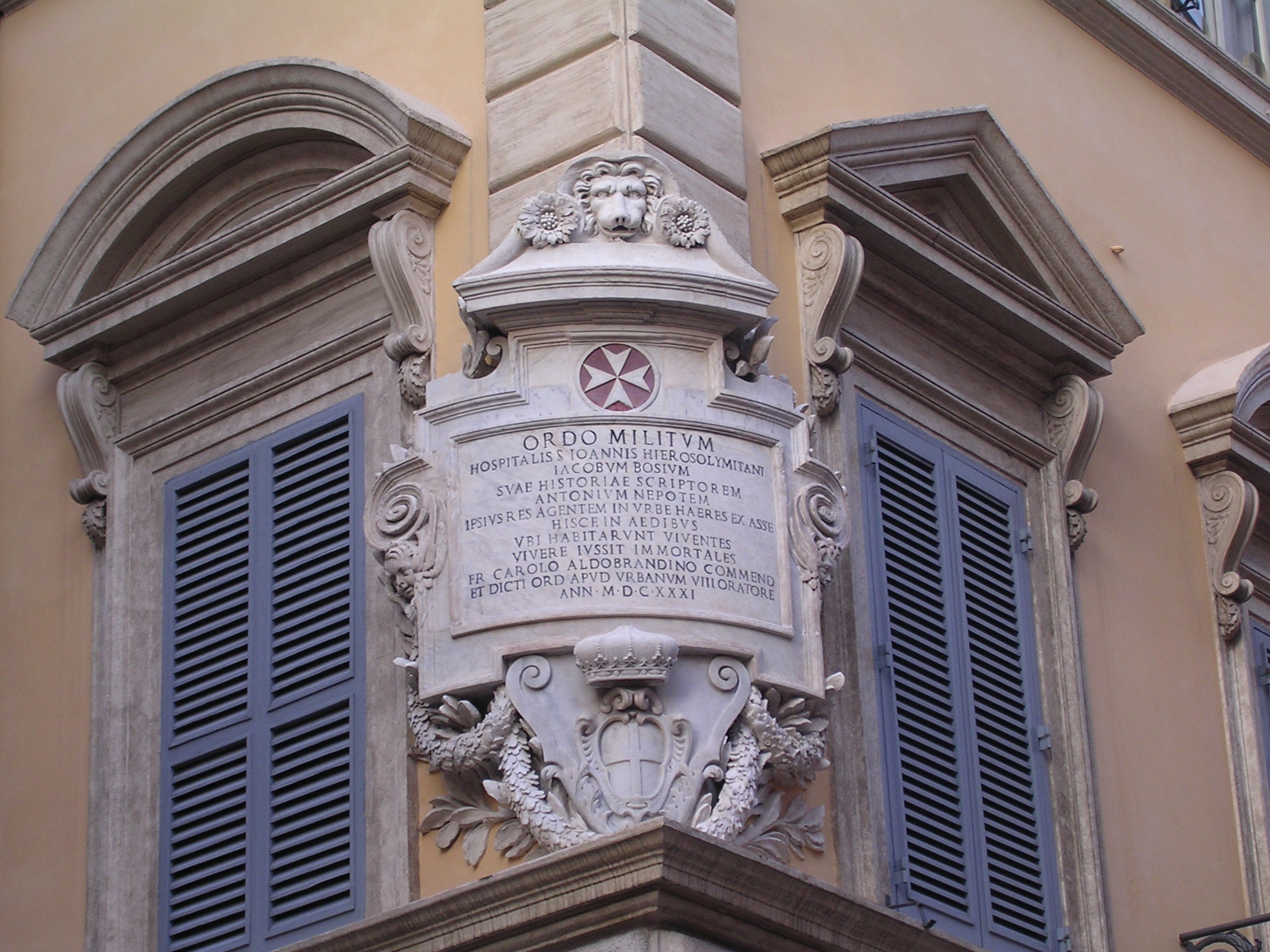
Detail of Palazzo di Malta, headquarters of the Sovereign Military Order of Malta

Lining the stylish street and near the Piazza di Spagna and Largo Goldoni are several structures of touristic, historical or monumental interest.

- Santissima Trinità a Via Condotti (18th century)
- Palazzo degli Ansellini (19th century)
- Palazzo Della Porta Negroni Caffarelli (19th century)
- Palazzo Avogadri Neri (17th century)
- Palazzo di Malta (18th century)
- Palazzo Megalotti (18th century)
- Antico Caffè Greco (18th century)
- Palazzo Maruscelli Lepri (17th century)

== Transportation ==
Via dei Condotti is a pedestrian thoroughfare. Spagna station of the Rome Metro is nearby; the station opened in 1980.
