= Maria Domenica Brun Barbantini =

Blessed Maria Domenica Brun Barbantini
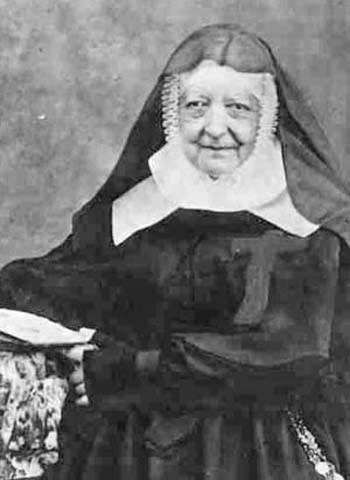
- Born: 17 January 1789; Lucca, Republic of Lucca
- Died: 22 May 1868 (aged 79); Lucca, Kingdom of Italy
- Venerated in: Roman Catholic Church
- Beatified: 7 May 1995, Saint Peter's Square, Vatican City by Pope John Paul II
- Feast: 22 May

Maria Domenica Brun Barbantini (17 January 1789 — 22 May 1868) was an Italian Roman Catholic religious sister and the founder of the Camillian Sisters Ministers of the Sick. Barbantini served the ill throughout her entire life and she dedicated her life to God]following the premature deaths of her husband and son. Barbantini's beatification was held in Saint Peter's Square in mid-1995.

== Life ==
Maria Domenica Brun was born in 1789 in Lucca to the Swiss-born Pietro Brun and Giovanna Granducci. Three younger brothers and her father all died during her adolescence.

Brun married Salvatore Barbantini on 22 April 1811 at the Cathedral of Saint Martin but her husband died that October. At her husband's death, Brun took a private vow of consecration to God and vowed to dedicate her life to the service of his people. Brun was pregnant at the point of her husband's death and soon gave birth to Lorenzo, who died aged eight after a short illness. She soon turned her grief into service of the poor and abandoned sick people of her city. In the evenings, in all weather, she traveled with a glowing lantern the narrow and dark streets of Lucca seeking out sick and dying women abandoned in their homes. Other young women joined her. Barbantini died in 1868.

== Beatification ==
The beatification process started on 6 May 1927, in an informative process that Archbishop Arturo Marchi inaugurated, involving the compilation of all documentation pertaining to her life. Archbishop Antonio Torrini concluded the process in a solemn Mass on 6 February 1931. Brun's writings received the approval of theologians to be in line with doctrine on 28 May 1935. Torrini later oversaw a supplementary process that spanned from 7 April 1937 until the following 10 July, and the Congregation for the Causes of Saints validated both processes on 1 February 1986, while later receiving the positio in two parts in both 1988 and in 1990.

Historians assented to the continuation of the cause on 11 October 1988 as did theologians on 20 April 1993 and the Congregation, who also approved it on 7 December 1993. Barbantini became titled as venerable on 26 March 1994 after Pope John Paul II confirmed that she had lived a life of heroic virtue. A miracle attributed to her intercession was investigated and then validated on 12 December 1986, while a medical board approved it on 5 May 1994. Theologians also granted their assent to it on 21 October 1994 as did the Congregation on 6 December 1994. Pope John Paul II confirmed it was a miracle on 15 December 1994 and then beatified Barbantini in Saint Peter's Square on 17 May 1995.

== Camillian Sisters ==
Barbantini spent time living with the Visitandines and later met the priest Antonio Scalabrini who guided her to the spirit of service to all people and to the service of the ill and frail. To that end she founded the Camillian Sisters Ministers of the Sick on 23 January 1829 in order to aid those ailing with illnesses. At first, the first community was called the 'Sisters Oblate Nurses', but subsequently was known as the women Ministers of the Sick of St. Camillus (in Latin Institutum Sororum Infirmis Ministrantium). It later received diocesan approval on 5 August 1841.

The Religious Institute of the Sister Ministers of the Infirm (MI) established its first foundations in Kenya in 1976, assisting the Camillian missionary fathers at the Tabaka Mission Hospital in Kisii Diocese. As of 2018 they work in four provinces, and serve in the maternity department of the Fatima Health Centre in the Diocese of Ngong. In 1979, the Camillian Sisters arrived in the Philippines, where they operate the "Camillian Sisters Polyclinic and Rehabilitation Center".
