= Santa Maria Maddalena =

- Church of Saint Mary Magdalene
- Chiesa di Santa Maria Maddalena
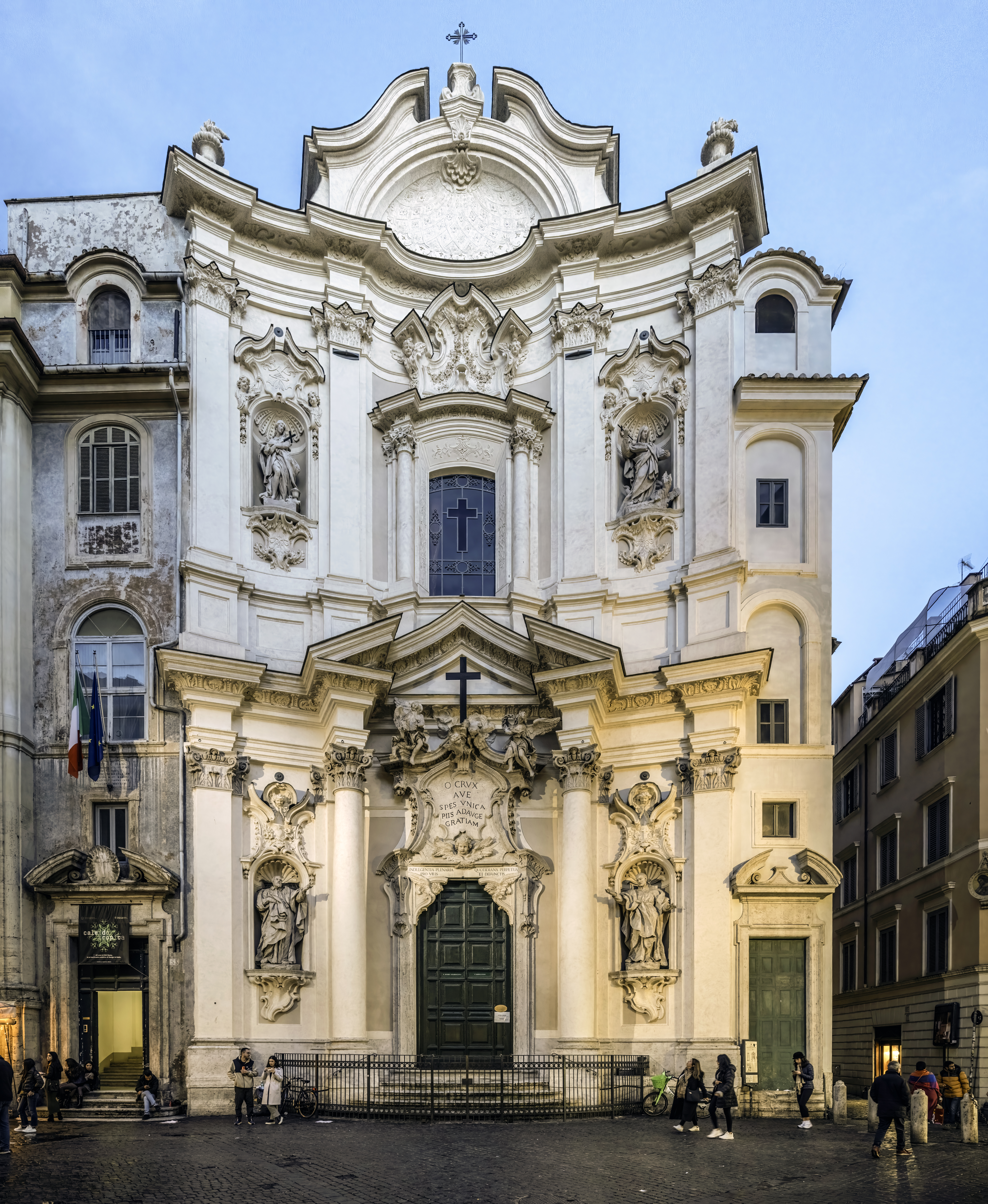
- Click on the map for a fullscreen view
- 41°54′00″N 12°28′36″E
- Location: Piazza della Maddalena 53, Rome
- Country: Italy
- Language: Italian
- Denomination: Catholic
- Tradition: Roman Rite
- Religious institute: Camillians
- Website: www.camilliani.org/chiesa-di-santa-maria-maddalena-cenni-storici/

History
- Status: regional church General Curia of the Clerks Regular, Ministers to the Sick
- Dedication: Mary Magdalene

Architecture
- Functional status: active
- Architect: Carlo Fontana
- Architectural type: Rococo
- Completed: 1735

Administration
- Diocese: Rome

The Santa Maria Maddalena is a Catholic church in Rome, Italy dedicated to Saint Mary Magdalene. It is the conventual church of the adjacent General Curia of the Clerks Regular, Ministers to the Sick (Camillians), the world headquarters of the order. Located on the Via della Maddalena, one of the streets leading from the Piazza della Rotonda and the Pantheon in the Campo Marzio area, it is also Romes regional church for the people of Abruzzo.

== History ==
The church was built on a 14th-century chapel, Santa Maria Maddalena, the regional church for expatriates from the Abruzzo region. In 1586 Saint Camillus de Lellis was given the church as the seat of the Clerks Regular, Ministers to the Sick (Italian: Ministri degli Infirmi). In the early 17th century the congregation rebuilt and expanded the structure, which was completed in 1699 in the Baroque style.

== Architecture ==
In seventy years of work several architects were involved. Carlo Fontana designed the dome in 1673; Giovanni Antonio de Rossi later worked on the building.

It is uncertain who designed the curved main façade, which was finished circa 1735 and is Rococo, an unusual style in Roman church façades. It also displays motifs reminiscent of Borromini. Early guide books credit Giuseppe Sardi with its design. Between 1732 and 1734, however, as architect of the order, the Portuguese architect Manuel Rodrigues dos Santos directed the completion of works at the church. The historian Alessandra Marino believes that it is to Dos Santos, rather than Giuseppe Sardi, that the design for the highly unusual façade decoration should be attributed. The architectural historian Nina Mallory has also maintained that Sardi is unlikely to be the designer of the façade.

The lower part of the façade contains statues of Camillus De Lellis and Philip Neri, with Mary Magdalen and St. Martha in the upper part.

To the left of the church is the monastery, constructed circa 1678, by Paolo Amato from Palermo and completed by Carlo Francesco Bizzacheri in the early 1680s.

== Interior ==
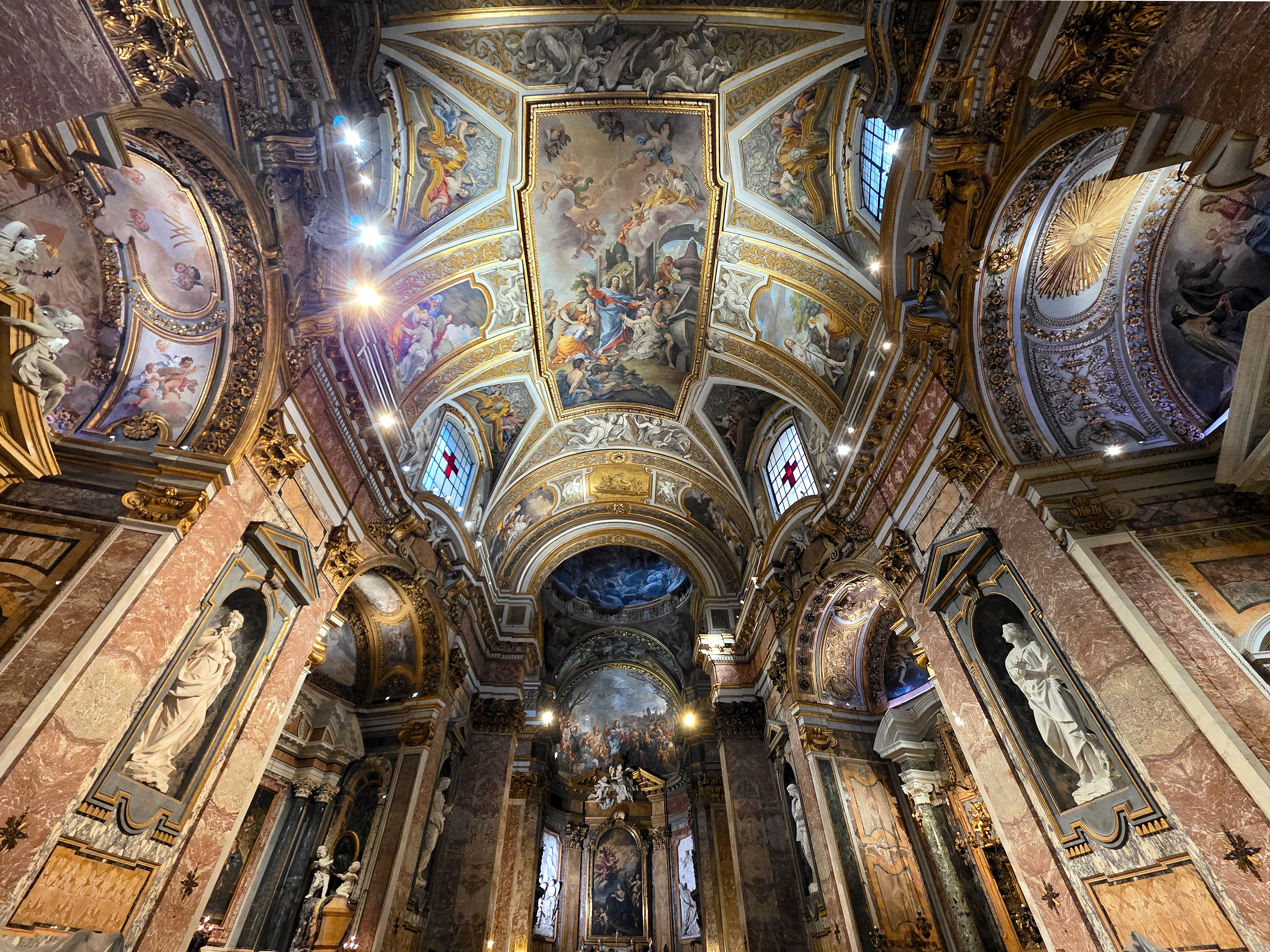
Elongated octagonal nave

The interior is architecturally complex, it has a Borrominesque elongated octagonal nave, with two chapels at each flank.

The Cappella di San Nicola di Bari, financed by Paolo Girolamo della Torre, was begun in 1690 by Mattia de Rossi and finished from 1694-96 by Bizzaccheri whose choice of colour tones would determine the colour scheme of the rest of the church in the mid-18th century. In this chapel is the painting Christ, Virgin, and San Nicola di Bari by Baciccia.

To the right is the chapel dedicated of Saint Camillus with the vault frescoed (1744) by Sebastiano Conca.

In the church is also has a painting of San Lorenzo Giustiniani with Infant Jesus by Luca Giordano.

The sacristy is a unique example of the Roman "Barocchetto" style made between 1738 and 1741, with wooden wardrobes and presses painted to resemble marble.

== Confraternity of Our Lady Help of the Sick ==
=== History ===
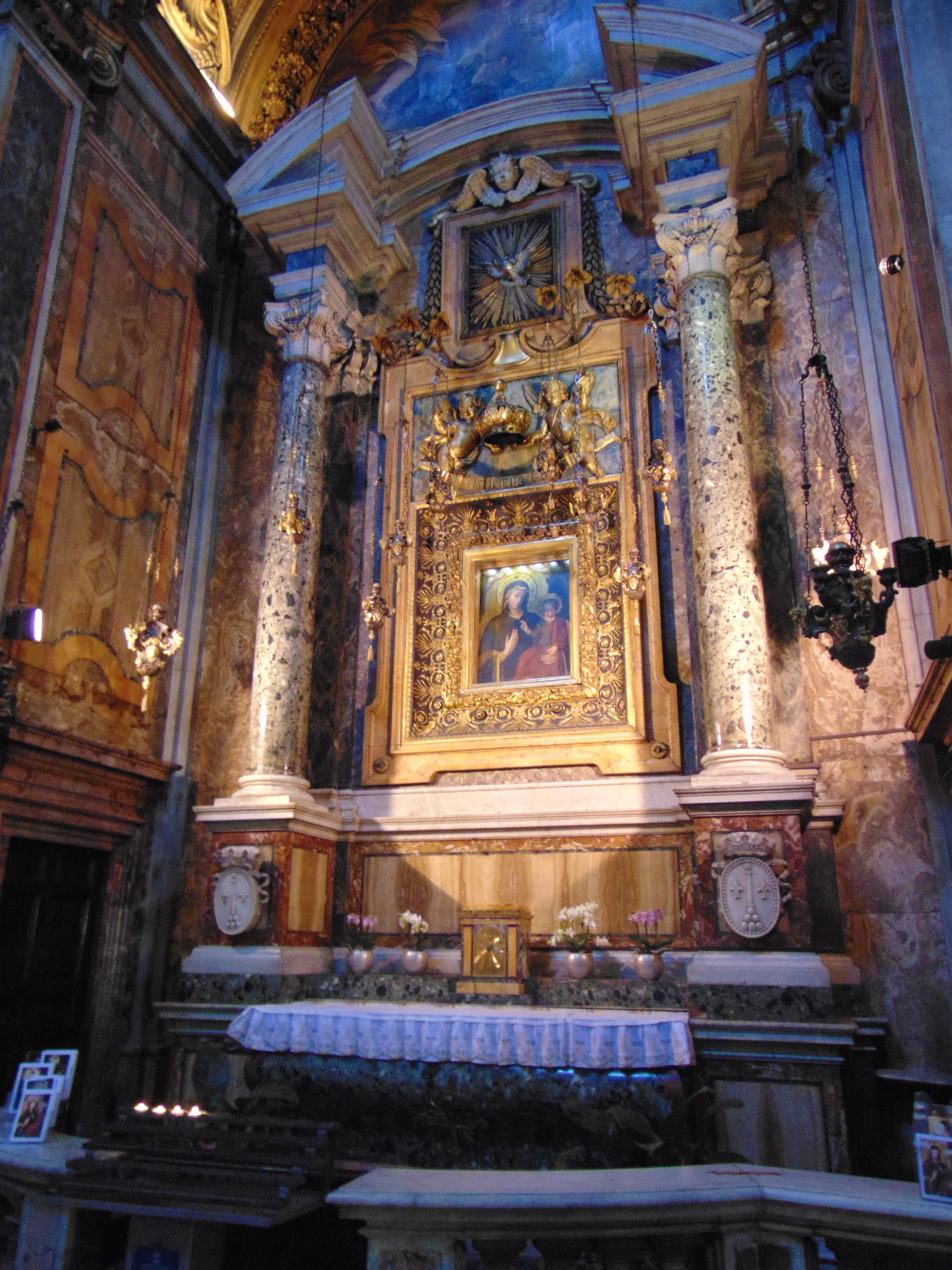
Madonna Salus Infirmorum, Chiesa di Santa Maria Maddalena (Roma)

The church holds a picture of the Blessed Virgin Mary which is specially venerated under the title of Our Lady Help of the Sick. This picture is said to have been painted by the celebrated Dominican, Fra Angelico and before it Pope Pius V is reportedly to have prayed for the victory of the Christian fleet during the Battle of Lepanto (1571). The image was given to Santa Maria Maddalena, the generalate house of the Camillians, by a Roman aristocratic lady in 1619. Formerly above the main altar, it now hangs in the Chapel of St. Camillus.

Pope Clement IX granted a decree of Canonical coronation and the coronation took place on 1668

The picture suggested to a brother of the Order of Saint Camillus de Lellis, Ferdinand Vicari, the idea of founding a confraternity under the invocation of the Virgin Mary for the poor sick. The confraternity was canonically erected in Santa Maria Maddalena in 1860.

Observed by some religious orders, the "Feast of Our Lady Help of the Sick" is the last Saturday before the last Sunday in August; while others celebrate it in October.

=== Scapular ===
The "Scapular of Our Lady Help of the Sick" is the badge of the Confraternity, originating in 1860.

The scapular is black and the front has an image of the Virgin Mary and at her feet St. Joseph and St. Camillus, the two other patrons of the sick and of the confraternity. The other side has a small red cloth cross. Indulgences were granted by Popes Pius IX and Leo XIII in 1860 and 1883; these were last ratified by the Congregation for Indulgences, 21 July 1883.

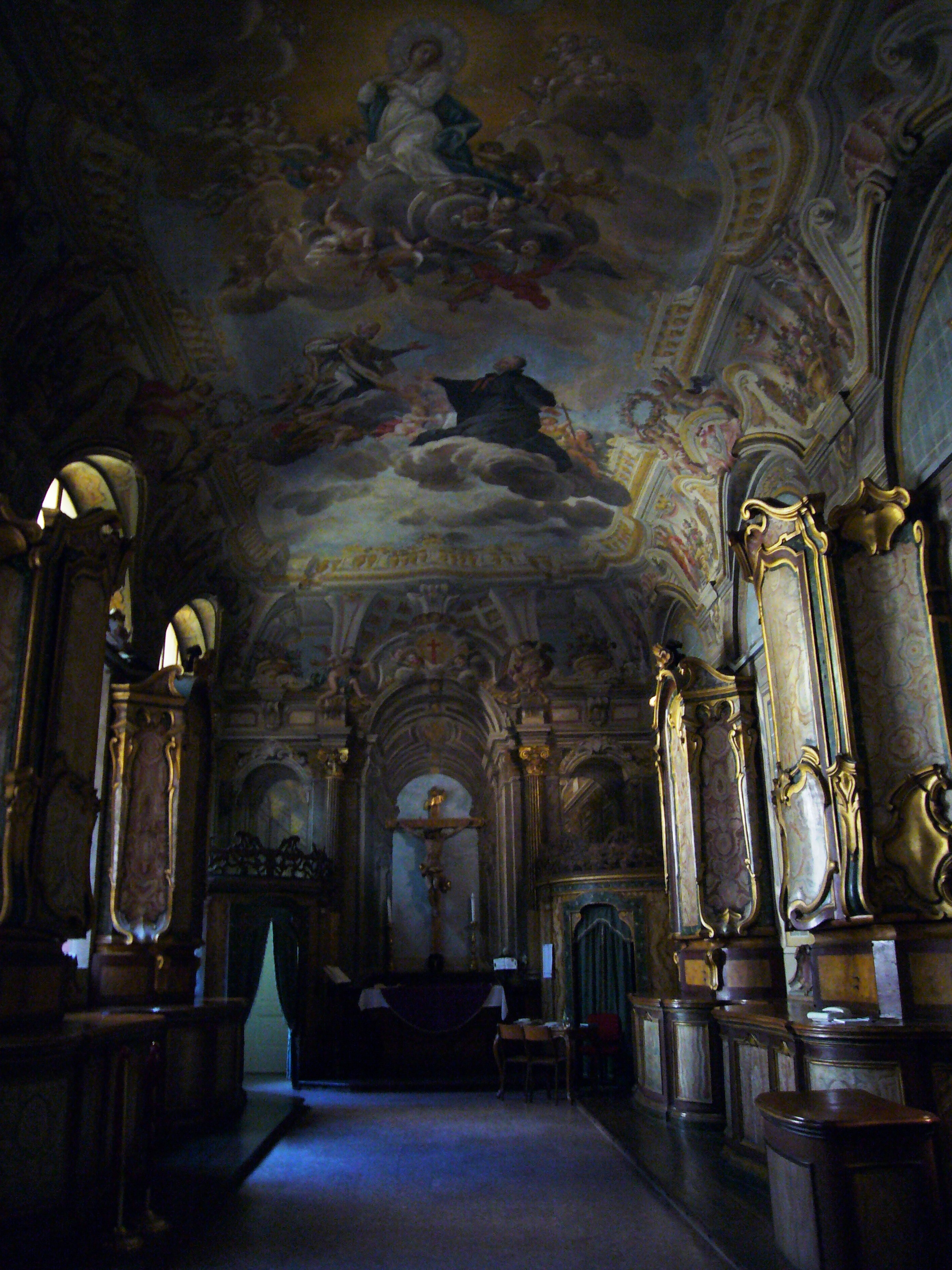
Sacristy

The church became a titular church in 2024.

== List of Cardinal-Priests ==
- Vicente Bokalic Iglic (7 December 2024 - present)

== Sources ==
- George Sullivan, 2006, Not Built in a Day: Exploring the Architecture of Rome, Carroll & Graf, ISBN 0-7867-1749-1
