= Luigi Tezza =

Blessed Luigi Tezza M.I.

Priest
- Born: 1 November 1841; Conegliano, Treviso, Kingdom of Lombardy–Venetia
- Died: 26 September 1923 (aged 81); Lima, Peru
- Venerated in: Roman Catholic Church
- Beatified: 4 November 2001, Saint Peter's Square, Vatican City by Pope John Paul II
- Feast: 26 September
- Attributes: Cassock; Cross
- Patronage: Daughters of St. Camillus

Luigi Tezza (1 November 1841 - 26 September 1923) was an Italian Roman Catholic priest and a professed member of the Camillians. He established the Daughters of St. Camillus and is known as the Apostle of Lima. He was ordained in 1864 and went on to serve the sick and the poor in Peru where he administered. Tezza's new religious congregation was established with the sole aim of sick relief and followed the example of the Camillian order as a branch of it.

On 4 November 2001 he was beatified as confirmation of his popular status as a Peruvian figure and as well as for his reputation for holiness.

== Life ==
Luigi Tezza was born on 1 November 1841 in Treviso as the sole child of Augustine Tezza (d. 1850) and Catherine Nedwiedt (d. 1880). After the death of his father in 1850 both he and his mother moved to Verona. At the age of 15 he entered as a postulant in the Camillian order in Verona. His mother later became a nun.

Under the guidance of Father Luigi Artini he made his first religious profession on 8 December 1858. He was ordained to the priesthood on 21 May 1864 under the Bishop of Verona Luigi Di Canossa and travelled to Rome as a novice master. Tezza desired to join those in the missions in Africa but this was denied to him. He later spent over three decades in France after being sent there on 10 August 1871 where he became the superior of a small home where he worked to establish other homes and centers for the poor and the ill. Tezza - to that end - also formed a Camillian province in France. Due to the conflict between the state and the church in 1880 he was expelled due to his clerical status and that of being a foreigner. Despite this he returned to France in disguise to continue his work with the sick.

In 1889 in Rome he was chosen as both the Vicar and Procurator General of his order where he commenced a project for a female branch of the Camillian order. He laid the foundation for such an establishment with Giuseppina Vannini - future Blessed - whom he met on 17 December 1891. With her aid Tezza founded on 2 February 1892 the Daughters of St. Camillus and he himself drew up the statutes for the new order. It began with about 50 women and it expanded at a rapid pace. The order was to receive the papal approval of Pope Pius XI in 1931.

The Camilian order soon faced crisis in Peru and Tezza embarked for Peru on 3 May 1900; he arrived there in June 1900 with Father Angelo Ferroni in order to cater to the situation. However prior to departure the Archbishop of Lima Manuel Tovar y Chamorro requested that he remain a little bit longer - he would remain in Peru for the remainder of his life. Tezza devoted himself to an intense apostolate of caring for the sick as well as the poor in hospitals and homes as well as prisons. He served as the confessor and spiritual director in various religious congregations. He also helped Teresa Candamo Álvarez-Calderon - future Venerable - overcome her initial difficulties with her new order.

Tezza died in Lima on 26 September 1923 and was mourned across Peru; he soon became known as the "Apostle of Lima". He was interred in the Generalate of his order in Rome. Cardinal Lorenzo Lauri described Tezza as "the holiest priest in the Diocese of Lima".

== Beatification ==
The beatification process commenced on two fronts in Rome and in Lima. The first process commenced on 21 November 1959 under Pope John XXIII - where he was accorded the title Servant of God - and concluded its work on 13 January 1964. This occurred despite the fact that the cause did not receive a formal introduction at the behest of the Congregation for the Causes of Saints until 15 January 1999. Nevertheless a second process was held that spanned from 16 April 1999 until 13 July 1999. Both processes were ratified on 8 October 1999 in order for the cause to proceed; the Positio was then sent to Rome for evaluation in 2000.

Pope John Paul II proclaimed Tezza to be Venerable on 24 April 2001 after he had recognized that he had lived a model Christian life of heroic virtue.

The miracle attributed to his intercession was investigated over a week from 15 May 1997 until 23 May 1997; it saw the accumulation of documentation and testimonies to attest to a miraculous healing. The process was ratified on 8 October 1999 and was forwarded to Rome for investigation. John Paul II approved it on 7 June 2001 and beatified Tezza on 4 November 2001.
