= Giuseppe Sardi =

Italian architect (1680–c.1768)

Giuseppe Sardi (1680 – documented until 1768) was an Italian architect active in Rome. He was born at Sant'Angelo in Vado, Marche which was then part of the Papal States. Known primarily for his church of Santa Maria del Rosario in Marino outside Rome, his name has been linked with the design of the façade of the church of Santa Maria Maddalena in Rome although his involvement with this and with some other building projects remains uncertain. He is not to be confused with the Swiss Italian architect, Giuseppe Sardi (1624–1699), who was active in Venice.

== Career ==
In contemporary sources, Sardi is described more often as acting in the capacity of a capomastro or master builder rather than as an architect. He designed and executed only one church from scratch, that of Santa Maria del Rosario in 1712 in the Colonna family fiefdom of Marino, in the Alban Hills outside Rome. The interior is centrally planned and has an unusual and elaborately decorated dome. This is also his first known work.

His work as capomastro is documented on the building sites of Santa Maria in Trastevere (where he worked under the direction of Recalcati in 1714), Santa Maria in Monticelli (where he worked under the direction of Sassi in 1715, about six years before his conjectured work on San Paolo alla Regola, located around the corner) and at Santissima Trinità dei Pellegrini (under the direction of Francesco de Sanctis in 1722 - 23). Sardi is also credited with one other minor work, the refurbishment of the baptistery of San Lorenzo in Lucina, executed between 1713 and 1721.

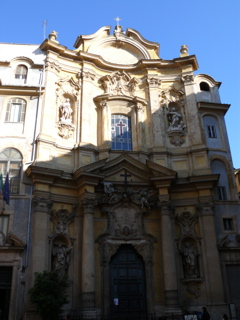
The façade of S. Maria Maddalena

A detail from the façade of S. Maria Maddalena

A detail from the façade of S. Maria Maddalena

Although Sardi's name has been connected with several churches in and around Rome, one of the mostly securely attested of his commissions is the addition of a new façade to the church of Santa Maria in Cosmedin in the Foro Boario in Rome. This façade was erected in place of the previous Romanesque façade in 1718, and destroyed in 1896 – 1899 but its appearance is recorded in Giuseppe Vasi's Magnificenze di Roma (Plate 56) as well as in photographs . Also confirmed is Sardi's authorship of the façade of the Trastavere church of Santi Quaranta Martiri (also known as San Pasquale Baylon) (1736–39). This façade appears to have been modelled on that by Francesco Fontana for the church of Santa Maria ad Nives, Rome (Santa Maria delle Neve), located near the Colosseum, and erected around 1708.

More contentious are Sardi's contributions to two other churches that had new (or renovated) façades finished in the period between 1720 and 1740. The first of these projects was the construction of a new façade for San Paolo alla Regola, a church which had been erected around 1687 to a design of Father Giovanni Battista Bergonzoni (called Borgognone), a teacher of theology at the college attached to the church. Vasi claims that the façade was the design of Giovanni Battista Conti, while Titi attributes it to 'Ciacomo Ciolli’ (Giacomo Cioli) and Sardi jointly. In sum, there is no scholarly consensus on how exactly the work should be divided.

A similar problem concerns the attribution to Sardi of the facade of Santa Maria Maddalena which is significant as one of a limited number of facades in Rome displaying the Rococo style, The facade was begun in the late seventeenth century and was still unfinished in 1734. Rossini's Mercurio errante (1741) and the 1745 edition of Roisecco's guide book do not mention the designer, although they do draw attention to the façade. The first mention of Sardi's involvement is in the 1750 edition of Roisecco's guide book. Scholars have long been undecided who should be credited with this design which has also been attributed to Emanuele Rodriguez Dos Santos. Too little of Sardi's work survives to permit attribution on stylistic grounds.
