= Camillians =

Roman Catholic religious order for the ministry to the sick

Clerics Regular, Ministers to the Sick
- Latin: Clerici Regulari Ministrantes Infirmis
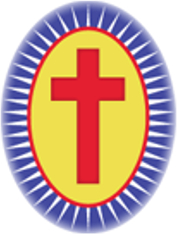
- Camillian red cross
- Abbreviation: MI
- Nickname: Camillians
- Formation: 1586; 440 years ago
- Founder: Camillus de Lellis
- Founded at: Rome
- Type: Order of clerics regular of pontifical right (for men)
- Headquarters: Santa Maria Maddalena, 53 Piazza della Maddalena, Rome, Italy
- Region served: Worldwide
- Members: 1,080
- Ministry: Care for the sick
- Parent organization: Catholic Church
- Website: www.camilliani.org

The Camillians or Clerics Regular, Ministers to the Sick (Latin: Clerici Regulari Ministrantes Infirmis) are a Catholic religious order founded in 1582 by St. Camillus de Lellis (1550–1614). A large red cross was chosen by the founder as the distinguishing badge for the members of the Order to wear upon their black cassocks: this was later adopted as the international symbol of medical care. In the past, because of the red cross on their apparel, they were also referred to as the Crociferi. As of 2018, 1080 Camillians serve in 35 countries. They use the postnominal initials of M.I. (Ministri degli Infermi).

== History ==
=== Camillus de Lellis ===
Camillus lived much of his early life as a soldier, following his father's path. When his regiment was disbanded, he happened to find work as a laborer for a Capuchin friary. One of the friars led him to a religious conversion, after which he sought admission to the Capuchin Order. The Capuchins were willing to accept de Lellis as a candidate. He had sustained a leg wound, however, in the course of his military career, which would not heal. After examination, it was declared incurable by physicians. He then moved to Rome, where he took up residence in a hospital dedicated to the care of the incurably ill, the San Giacomo degli Incurabili. As he progressed in his spiritual life, he noticed the poor care given the patients by the attendants of the hospital.

=== Order of the Ministers of the Sick ===
De Lellis invited some young men he had come to know through his religious circles to care for the patients for a more concrete expression of their faith. They began to work at the Ospedale di Santo Spirito in Sassia in Rome, and demonstrated a level of commitment, which caused him to consider forming a religious community to provide this care for the sick. He received Holy Orders to this end, and both he and his disciples took religious vows. De Lellis thereby established the Order of Clerics Regular, Ministers to the Sick.

His experience in wars led him to establish a group of health care workers who would assist soldiers on the battlefield. In response to a request of the Pope, Camillus sent religious to Hungary to care for wounded or sick soldiers. The large, red cross on their religious habits, which they adopted as a sign of their vocation to medical care, remains a symbol of the Order. Camillians today continue to identify themselves with this emblem on their habits, a symbol universally recognized today as the sign of charity and service. This was the original Red Cross, hundreds of years before the International Red Cross was formed. In 1586 the group obtained the approval of Pope Sixtus V and in 1591 Pope Gregory XIV gave them the status of an Order with the name of 'Order of the Ministers of the Sick'.

According to Camillians, during the siege of Nagykanizsa in 1601, while Camillians were busily occupied with the wounded, the tent in which they were tending to the sick and in which they had all of their equipment and supplies was completely destroyed and burned to the ground. Everything in the tent was destroyed, except for the red cross of the habit belonging to one of the Camillians who was ministering to the wounded on the battlefield. This event was taken by the community as manifesting divine approval of the Red Cross of St. Camillus.

It was due to the efforts of the Brothers and alleged supernatural healings by de Lellis that the people of Rome credited De Lellis with ridding the city of a great plague and the subsequent famine. For a time, he became known as the "Saint of Rome". By the time of his death in 1614, Camillians served in eight hospitals, including ones in Naples, Genoa, Milan and Mantua.

In 1630 a plague devastated the north and centre of Italy. Over a hundred Camillians provided assistance to the plague-stricken and fifty-six religious died while providing them service. In the years 1656-57 another plague in Italy led to the death of eighty-six Camillian religious who were looking after the plague-stricken. Annually, on May 25 the order commemorates the "Camillian Martyrs of Charity", all those Camillian priests and brothers who died after contracting diseases in the course of ministering to the sick.

=== Expansion ===
The Irish province developed from the French Province. Started by Fr. Terence O'Rourke in Westmeath in 1935, it became an official province in 1946. After the war the Irish Province spread to England, set up houses in Birmingham, London and Hexham and became known as the Anglo-Irish Province. During the early 1960s, two members were sent to Perth, Australia. In 2000 the Anglo-Irish Province opened a Mission in Uganda. As of 2014, there were fifteen members of the Anglo-Irish Province.

The presence of the Camillians in Asia, which began in 1943 in China. In Taiwan the order operates the 700 bed St. Mary's Hospital, a 230-bed center for the mentally disabled, a home for the elderly with 150 beds, and a nursing school with more than 3,000 students.

Camillians arrived in Thailand in 1952. A small clinic in Baan Pong, Ratchaburi province, later became San Camillo Hospital. They also run Camillian Hospital.

In 1975, the first Camillian Community in the Philippines was established in Quezon City under the Lombardo-Venetian Province. The Vice-Province in India was first established in 1980 in Kerala by Fr. Antonio Crotti of the Lombardo Venetian (Italy) Province. In 1997, Camillians undertook a healthcare initiative for the care and support of people living with HIV. This is in addition, and complementary to their ministries in pastoral care, especially with palliative care for cancer patients, and in jail ministry.

The order runs 56 hospitals in Brazil. In the U.S. it operates a number of home health care services.

== Current status ==
As of 2018, the Order of St. Camillus serves in 42 countries. The Order is made up of about 1080 priests and brothers, engaged in a variety of ministries. The priests work mainly in the area of spiritual care for the sick and the brothers provide trained physical care. Besides the common three vows, the members of the Order take a fourth vow to serve the poor sick, even when they are infectious, even at the risk to their own lives. The order's rule states that each member should:

[...] ask the Lord for a motherly affection for their neighbor so that we may serve them with all charity, both in soul and body, because we desire, with the grace of God, to serve all the sick with the affection that a loving mother has for her only sick child.

When flooding would periodically cause the Tiber River to top its banks, Camillus worked to bring the patients of the Hospital of the Holy Spirit to safety. Today the Camillian Task Force Order responds to natural or man-made disasters. Members of the Lay Camillian family work beside the Camillians in various ministries as nurses, caregivers, pastoral caregivers, and extraordinary ministers of the Eucharist.

As of July 2014, Fr. Leocir Pessini from Brazil is the current Superior General. His predecessor, the Very Reverend Father Renato Salvatore, M.I., was named by Pope Benedict XVI to serve as one of the papally-appointed, non-episcopal participants, representing the Church's religious orders, at the October 2012 13th Ordinary General Assembly of the Synod of Bishops on the New Evangelization. Salvatore was arrested in November 2013 and charged with unlawfully detaining two priests to prevent them voting against him in the election for the Superior General. Fr. Leocir Pessini was then elected as the new Superior General.

Camillians celebrate November 16 as the Virgin Mary's feast day, calling her "Our Lady Health of the Sick".

== Structure ==
The Order is divided into Ecclesiastical Provinces (the main level of geographical jurisdictions), some of which have Delegations and/or Foundations in other continents; they are distributed geographically as follows: Europe is divided into 11 Provinces (four of which are in Italy), and four Foundations; Asia into one Province, three Delegations and four Foundations; Africa into two Delegations and five Foundations; Australia into one Delegation.

=== General Council ===
- Fr. Pedro Tramontin, MI: General Superior
- Fr. Gianfranco Lunardon, MI: Vicar General
- Fr. Baby Ellickal, MI: Consultor
- Fr. Médard Aboue, MI: Consultor
- Br. Paul Kabore, MI: Consultor

=== Provinces ===
- Anglo-Irish Province
- Austrian Province
- Brazilian Province
- Dutch Province
- French Province
- German Province
- Lombard-Venetian Province (central and eastern parts of northern Italy, the former Austrian part)
- North-American Province
- Piedmontese Province (north western Italy)
- The Philippine Province
  - Taiwan
  - Australia
- Polish Province
- Roman Province
- Sicilian-Neapolitan Province (southern Italy)
- Spanish Province
- Province of Thailand
- Indian Province
- Vietnamese Vice - Province

=== Foundations ===
- Armenia
- Benin
- Canada
- Ecuador
- Haiti
- Georgia (country)
- Germany
- Italy
- Hungary
- Madagascar
- Tanzania

=== Delegations ===
- Burkina Faso
- Argentina
- Australia
- Colombia
- Peru
- Kenya
- Indonesia
- Pakistan

== Saints, Blesseds, and other holy people ==
=== Saints ===
- Camillus de Lellis (25 May 1550 – 14 July 1614), founder of the order, canonized on 29 June 1746
- Giuditta Vannini (7 July 1859 – 23 February 1911), founder of the Daughters of Saint Camillus together with Bl. Luigi Tezza, canonized on 13 October 2019

=== Blesseds ===
- Maria Domenica Brun Barbantini (17 January 1789 – 22 May 1868), professed religious, founder of the Camillian Sisters Ministers of the Sick, beatified on 7 May 1995
- Luigi Tezza (1 November 1841 – 26 September 1923), priest and founder of the Daughters of Saint Camillus together with St. Giuditta Vannini, beatified on 4 November 2001
- Enrico Rebuschini (25 April 1860 – 10 May 1938), priest, beatified on 4 May 1997

=== Venerables ===
- Nicola d'Onofrio (24 March 1943 – 12 June 1964), cleric, declared Venerable on 5 July 2013

=== Servants of God ===
- Girolamo Tiraboschi (23 September 1733 – 14 August 1753), novice
- Rocco Ferroni (30 October 1856 – 13 May 1939), priest
- Alexandre Toe (2 December 1967 – 9 December 1996), priest from Burkina Faso
- Ettore Boschini (25 March 1928 – 20 August 2004), professed religious, declared as Servant of God in 2013

=== Martyrs of Charity ===
- The "Day of the Religious Martyrs of Charity" on May 25 is a commemoration of over 300 Camillians, seminarians, oblates, novices, brothers and priests, who died in serving the victims of plague in Italy, Spain, Hungary and Croatia during the first four centuries of the life of the Order.

== See also ==
- Maria Domenica Brun Barbantini, founder of Camillian Sisters
- Giuditta Vannini, founder of the Daughters of St. Camillus
