= List of Polish Catholic saints =

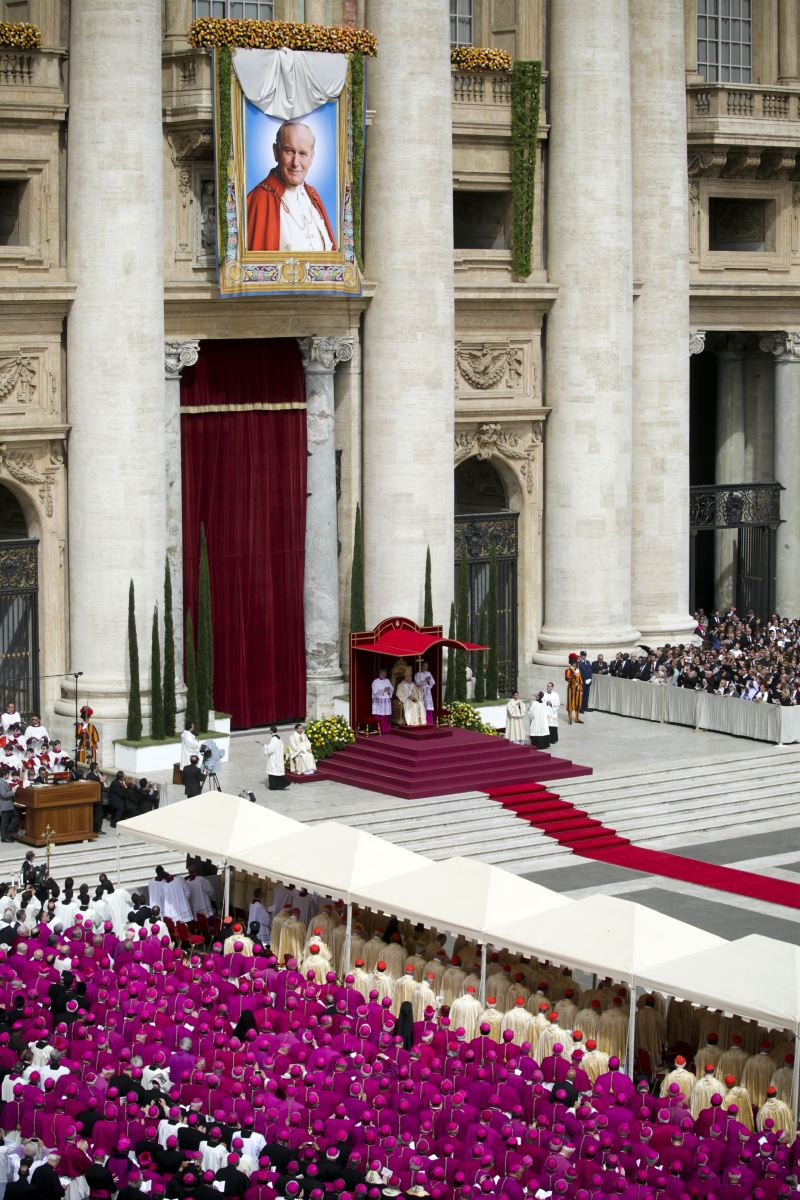
Beatification of Pope John Paul II, the first Polish Pope of the Roman Catholic Church

The following is a list of Roman Catholic saints, blesseds, venerables, servants of God and candidates for sainthood who are considered to be "Polish", although not all of these saints are native-born Poles.

== Saints ==
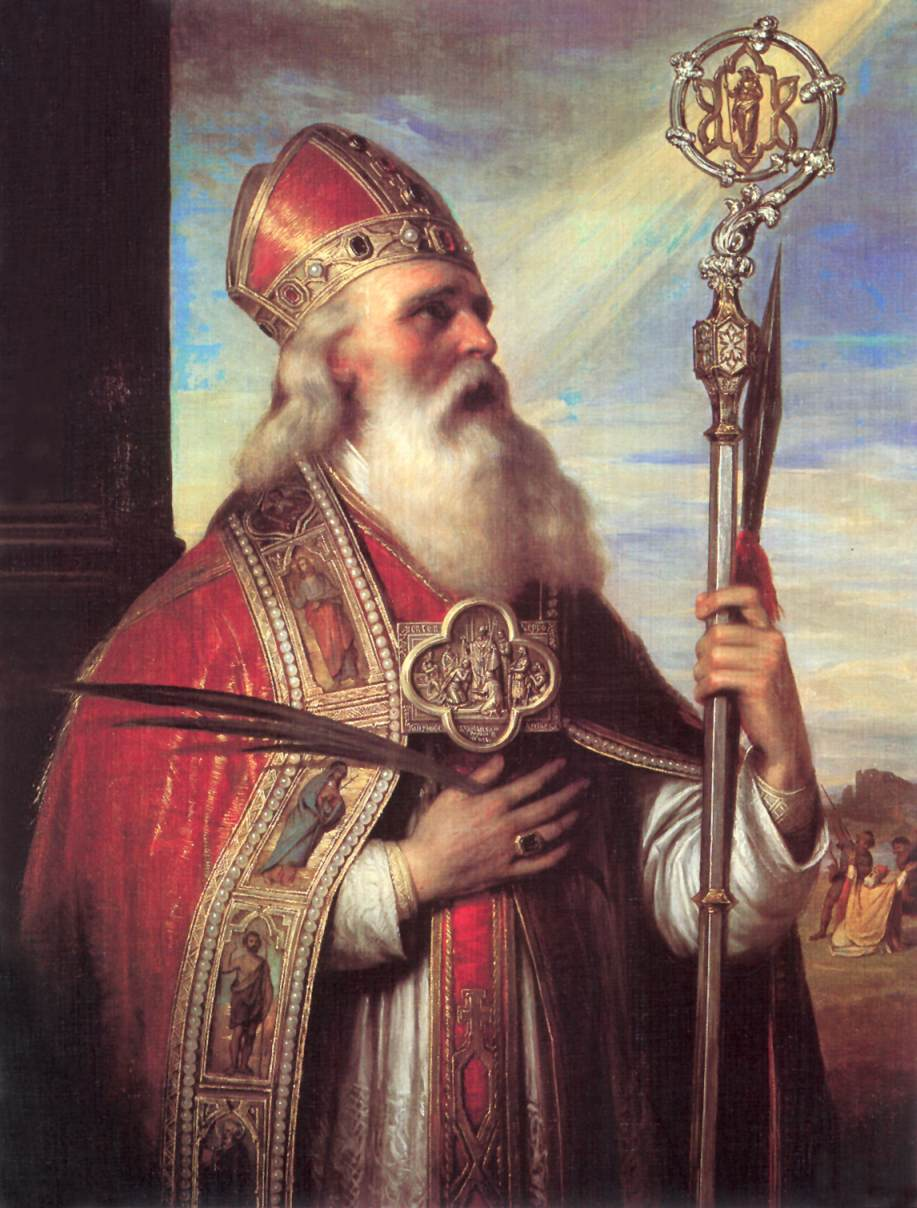
St. Adalbert of Prague

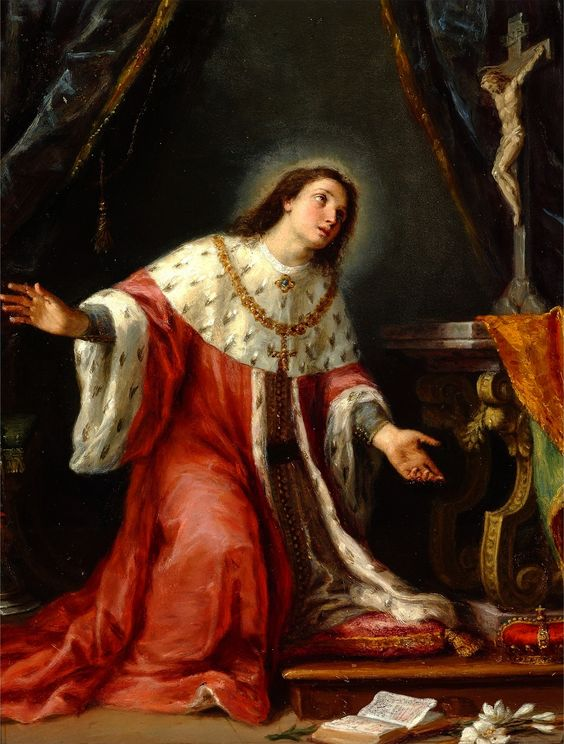
St. Casimir

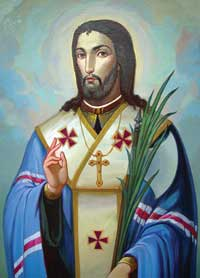
St. Josaphat Kuntsevych

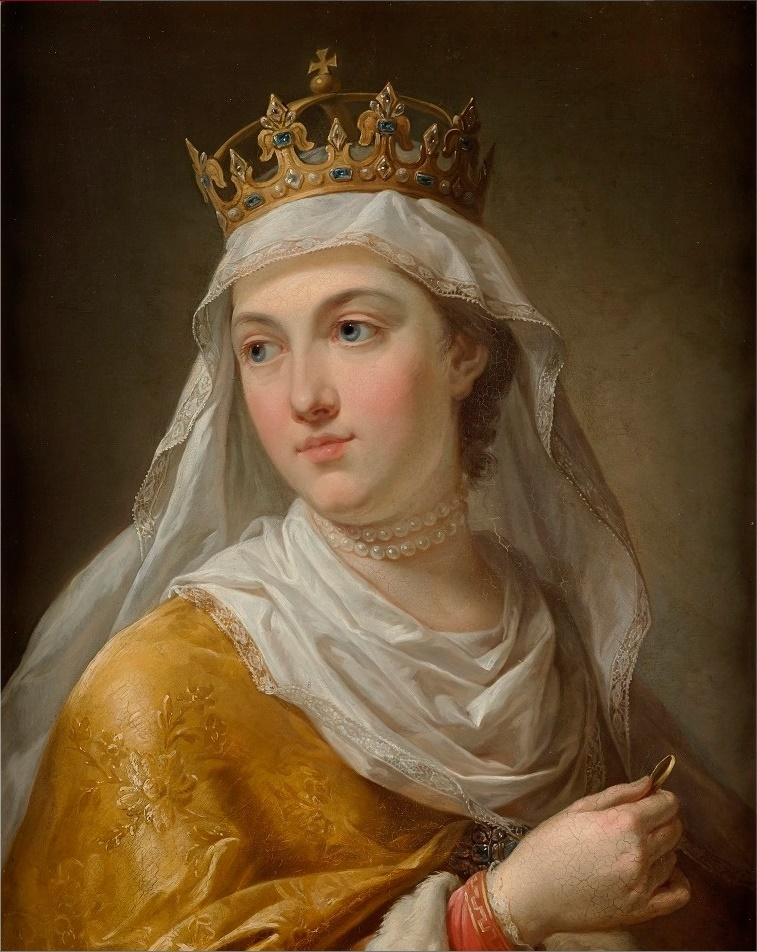
St. Jadwiga of Poland

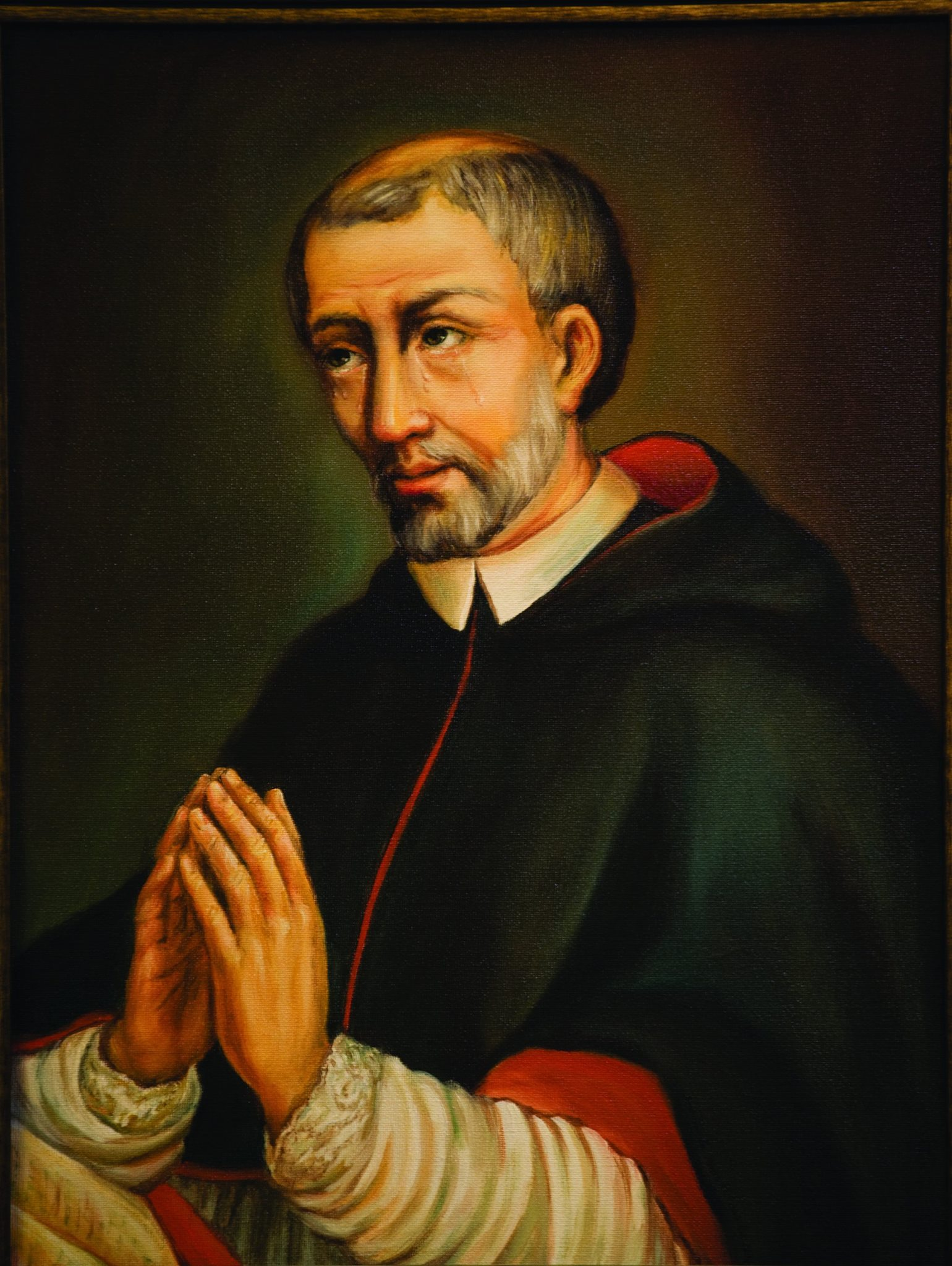
St. Stanisław Kazimierczyk

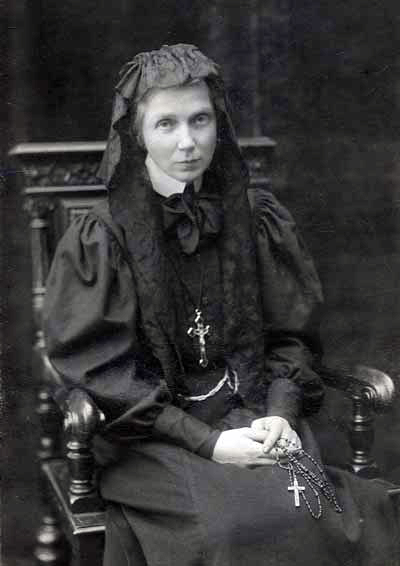
St. Ursula Ledóchowska

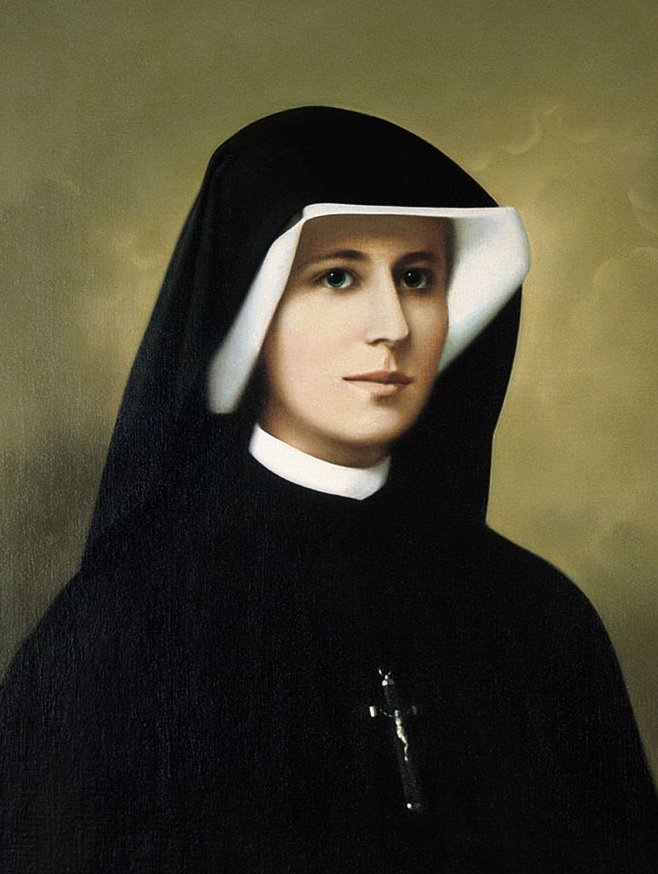
St. Faustina Kowalska

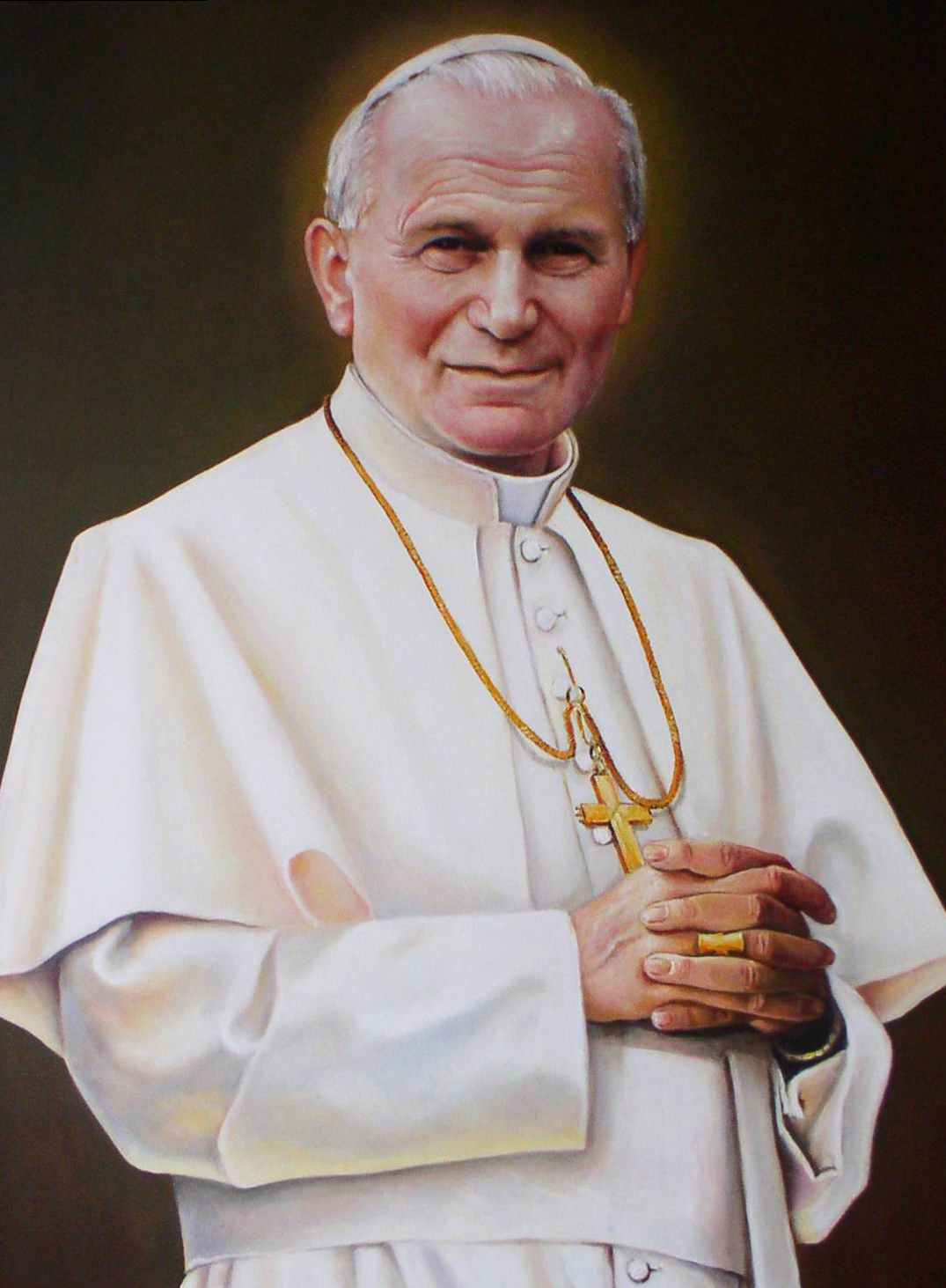
St. Pope John Paul II

- Wojciech of Prague (Adalbert) (c. 956–997), Benedictine; Bishop of Prague (Nymburk, Czech Republic – Elbląg, Poland)
  - Canonized: 999 by Pope Sylvester II
- Andrzej Świerad (c. 980–1009), Benedictine (Kazimierza, Poland – Nitra, Slovakia)
  - Canonized: 1085 by Pope Gregory VII
- Stojislav of Szkalka (Benedykt) (d. 1012), Benedictine (Nitra, Slovakia)
  - Canonized: 1085 by Pope Gregory VII
- Otto of Bamberg (1060–1139), Bishop of Bamberg (Bavaria, Germany)
  - Canonized: 29 April 1189 by Pope Clement III
- Stanisław from Szczepanów (1030–1079), Bishop of Kraków; martyr (Brzesko – Kraków, Poland)
  - Canonized: 8 September 1253 by Pope Innocent IV
- Hedwig of Silesia (1174–1243), Married Layperson of House of Andechs (Bavaria, Germany – Wrocław, Poland)
  - Canonized: 26 March 1267 by Pope Clement IV
- Kazimierz Jagiellończyk (1458–1484), Layman of the Archdiocese of Kraków (Kraków, Poland – Grodno, Belarus)
  - Canonized: 1 December 1521 by Pope Leo X
- Jacek Odrowąź (c. 1185–1257), Dominican (Opole – Kraków, Poland)
  - Canonized: 17 April 1594 by Pope Clement VIII
- Stanisław Kostka (1550–1568), Novice of the Jesuits (Przasnysz, Poland – Rome, Italy)
  - Beatified: 14 August 1605 by Pope Leo XI
  - Canonized: 31 December 1726 by Pope Benedict XIII
- Jan Wacięga z Kęty (Joannes Cantius) (1390–1473), (Oświęcim – Kraków, Poland)
  - Beatified: 28 March 1676 by Pope Clement X
  - Canonized: 16 July 1767 by Pope Clement XIII
- Yosafat Kuntsevich (c. 1580–1623), Basilian of Saint Josaphat; Archeparch of Polotsk; martyr (Volyn, Ukraine – Vitebsk, Belarus)
  - Beatified: 16 May 1643 by Pope Urban VIII
  - Canonized: 29 June 1867 by Pope Pius IX
- Johannes Hofbauer (Klemens Maria) (1751–1820), Redemptorist (Znojmo, Czech Republic – Vienna, Austria)
  - Declared "Venerable": 14 May 1876
  - Beatified: 29 January 1888 by Pope Leo XIII
  - Canonized: 20 May 1909 by Pope Pius X
- Andrzej Bobola (1591–1657), Jesuit; martyr (Sandomierz, Poland – Brest, Belarus)
  - Declared "Venerable": 9 February 1755
  - Beatified: 30 October 1853 by Pope Pius IX
  - Canonized: 17 April 1938 by Pope Pius XI
- Rajmund Kolbe (Maksymilian Maria) (1894–1941), Franciscan Conventual, martyr (Zdunska-Wola – Oświęcim, Poland)
  - Declared "Venerable": 30 January 1969
  - Beatified: 17 October 1971 by Pope Paul VI
  - Canonized: 10 October 1982 by Pope John Paul II
- Albert Chmielowski (Albert) (1845–1916), Founder of the Brothers of the Third Order of Saint Francis, Servants of the Poor (Albertine Brothers) and the Sisters Servants of the Poor (Albertine Sisters) (Igołomia-Wawrzeńczyce – Kraków, Poland)
  - Declared "Venerable": 20 January 1977
  - Beatified: 22 June 1983 by Pope John Paul II
  - Canonized: 12 November 1989 by Pope John Paul II
- Józef Kalinowski (Rafał of Saint Joseph) (1835–1907), Discalced Carmelite (Vilnius, Lithuania – Wadowice, Poland)
  - Declared "Venerable": 11 October 1980
  - Beatified: 22 June 1983 by Pope John Paul II
  - Canonized: 17 November 1991 by Pope John Paul II
- Jan Sarkander (1576–1620), Diocesan priest of the Archdiocese of Olomouc; martyr (Śląskie, Poland – Olomoucký kraj, Czech Republic)
  - Declared "Venerable": 11 September 1859
  - Beatified: 6 May 1980 by Pope John Paul II
  - Canonized: 21 May 1995 by Pope John Paul II
- Melchior Grodziecki (c. 1584–1619), Jesuit; martyr
  - Declared "Venerable": January 6, 1904
  - Beatified: 15 January 1905 by Pope Pius X
  - Canonized: 2 July 1995 by Pope John Paul II
- Jadwiga Andegaweńska (1374–1399), Married Layperson of the Archdiocese of Kraków; Queen of Poland (Budapest, Hungary – Kraków, Poland)
  - Beatified: 8 August 1986 by Pope John Paul II
  - Canonized: 8 June 1997 by Pope John Paul II
- Jan of Dukla (1414–1484), Franciscan Observan (Krosno, Poland – Lviv, Ukraine)
  - Beatified: 21 January 1733 by Pope Clement XII
  - Canonized: 10 June 1997 by Pope John Paul II
  - Declared "Venerable": 26 January 1987
  - Beatified: 1 May 1987 by Pope John Paul II
  - Canonized: 11 October 1998 by Pope John Paul II
- Kinga of Poland (1224–1292), Poor Clare (Budapest, Hungary – Stary Sącz, Poland)
  - Beatified: June 11, 1690 by Pope Alexander VIII
  - Canonized: June 16, 1999 by Pope John Paul II
- Helena Kowalska (Maria Faustyna) (1905–1938), Sister of Our Lady of Mercy (Łęczyca – Kraków, Poland)
  - Declared "Venerable": 7 March 1992
  - Beatified: 18 April 1993 by Pope John Paul II
  - Canonized: 30 April 2000 by Pope John Paul II
- Józef Sebastian Pelczar (1842–1924), Bishop of Przemyśl of the Latins; Founder of the Sister Servants of the Most Sacred Heart of Jesus (Krosno – Przemyśl, Poland)
  - Declared "Venerable": February 18, 1989
  - Beatified: 2 June 1991 by Pope John Paul II
  - Canonized: 18 May 2003 by Pope John Paul II
- Julia Ledóchowska (Urszula) (1865–1939), Founder of the Ursulines of the Agonizing Heart of Jesus (Melk, Austria – Rome, Italy)
  - Declared "Venerable": 14 May 1983
  - Beatified: 20 June 1983 by Pope John Paul II
  - Canonized: 18 May 2003 by Pope John Paul II
- Zygmunt Gorazdowski (1845–1920), Priest of the Archdiocese of Lviv of the Latins; Founder of Sisters of Saint Joseph of the Third Order of Saint Francis of Assisi (Podkarpackie, Poland – Lviv, Ukraine)
  - Declared "Venerable": December 20, 1999
  - Beatified: 26 June 2001 by Pope John Paul II
  - Canonized: 23 October 2005 by Pope Benedict XVI
- Józef Bilczewski (1860–1923), Archbishop of Lviv of the Latins (Bielsko, Poland – Lviv, Ukraine)
  - Declared "Venerable": December 18, 1997
  - Beatified: 26 June 2001 by Pope John Paul II
  - Canonized: 23 October 2005 by Pope Benedict XVI
- Szymon of Lipnica (c. 1439–1482), Franciscan Observant (Bochnia – Kraków, Poland)
  - Beatified: 24 February 1685 by Pope Innocent XI
  - Canonized: 3 June 2007 by Pope Benedict XVI
- Zygmunt Szczęsny Feliński (1822–1895), Archbishop of Warsaw; Founder of the Franciscan Sisters of the Family of Mary (Luts'k, Ukraine – Kraków, Poland)
  - Declared "Venerable": 24 April 2001
  - Beatified: 18 August 2002 by Pope John Paul II
  - Canonized: 11 October 2009 by Pope Benedict XVI
- Stanisław Kazimierczyk (1433–1489), Canons Regular of the Lateran (Kraków, Poland)
  - Declared "Venerable": 21 December 1992
  - Beatified: 18 April 1993 by Pope John Paul II
  - Canonized: 17 October 2010 by Pope Benedict XVI
- Karol Józef Wojtyła [Pope John Paul II] (1920–2005), (Wadowice, Poland – Vatican City)
  - Declared "Venerable": 19 December 2009
  - Beatified: 1 May 2011 by Pope Benedict XVI
  - Canonized: 27 April 2014 by Pope Francis
- Jan Papczyński (Stanisław of Jesus and Mary) (1631–1701), Religious priest and founder of the Marians of the Immaculate Conception (Nowy Sącz – Piaseczno, Poland)
  - Declared "Venerable": 13 June 1992
  - Beatified: 16 September 2007 by Cardinal Tarcisio Bertone, SDB
  - Canonized: 5 June 2016 by Pope Francis

== Blesseds ==
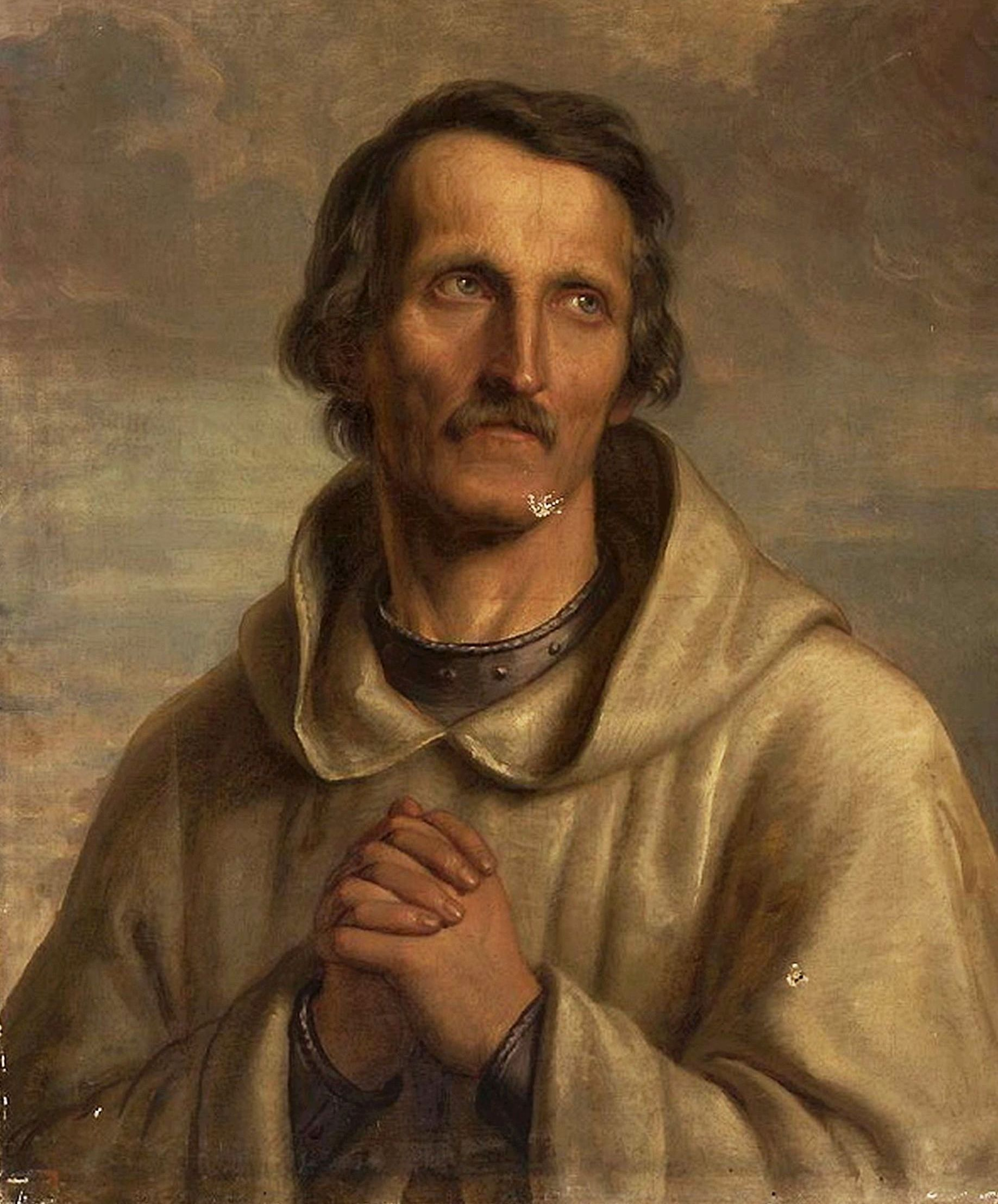
Bl. Wincenty Kadłubek, O.Cist

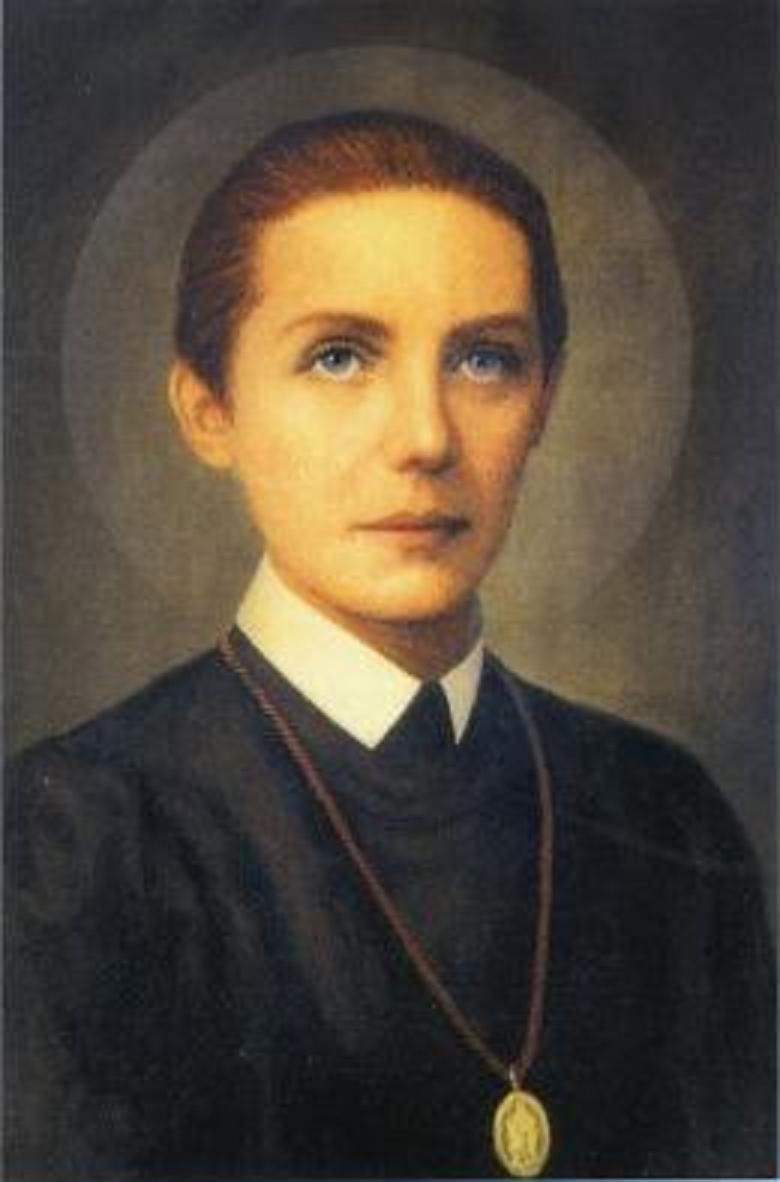
Bl. Mary Theresa Ledóchowska, S.M.S.P.C.

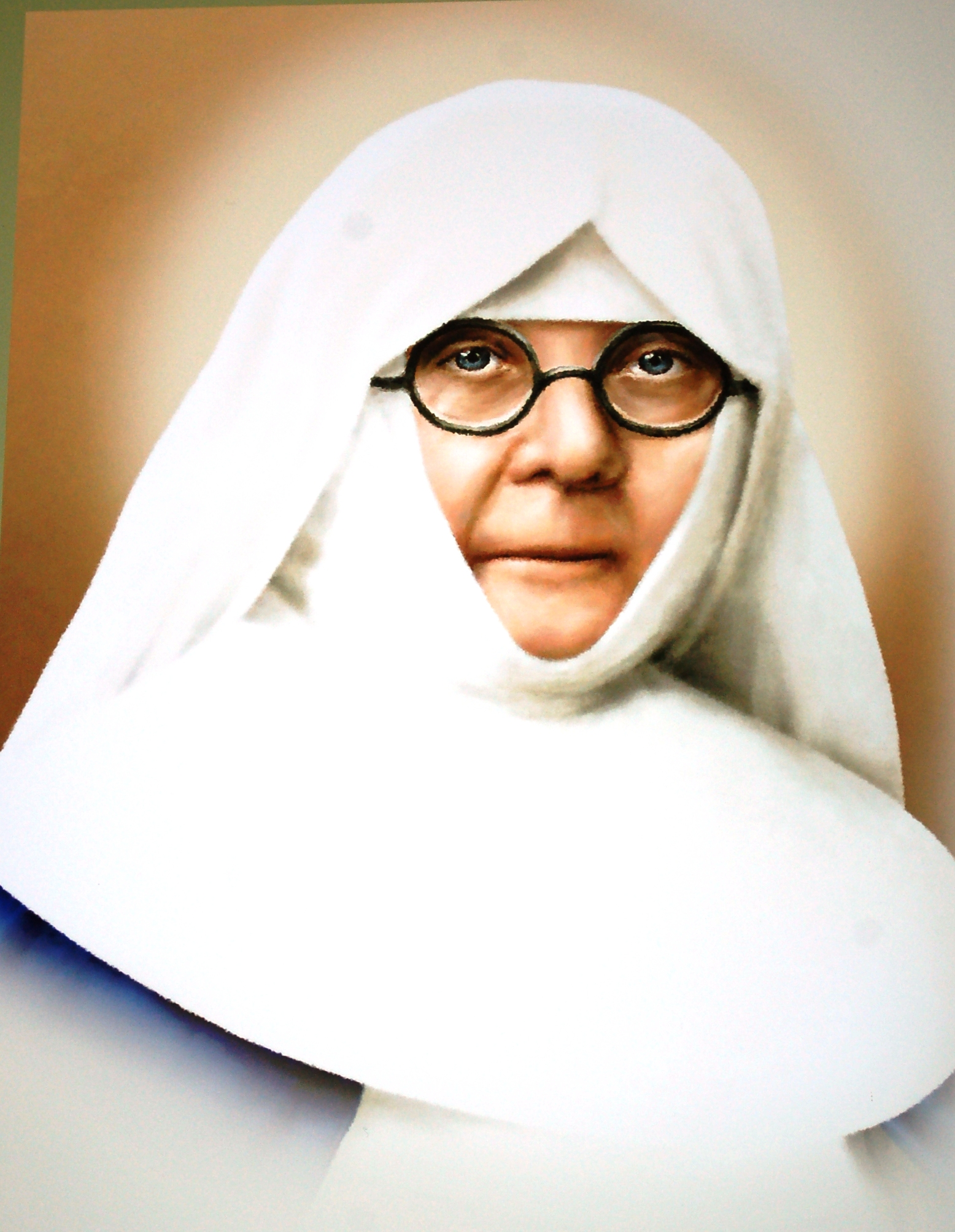
Bl. Marcelina Darowska, S.N.

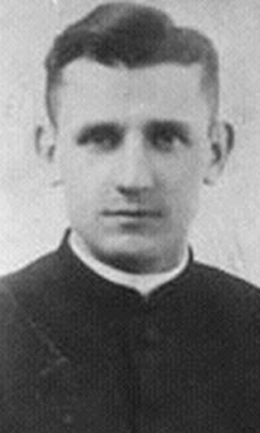
Bl. Stefan Wincenty Frelichowski

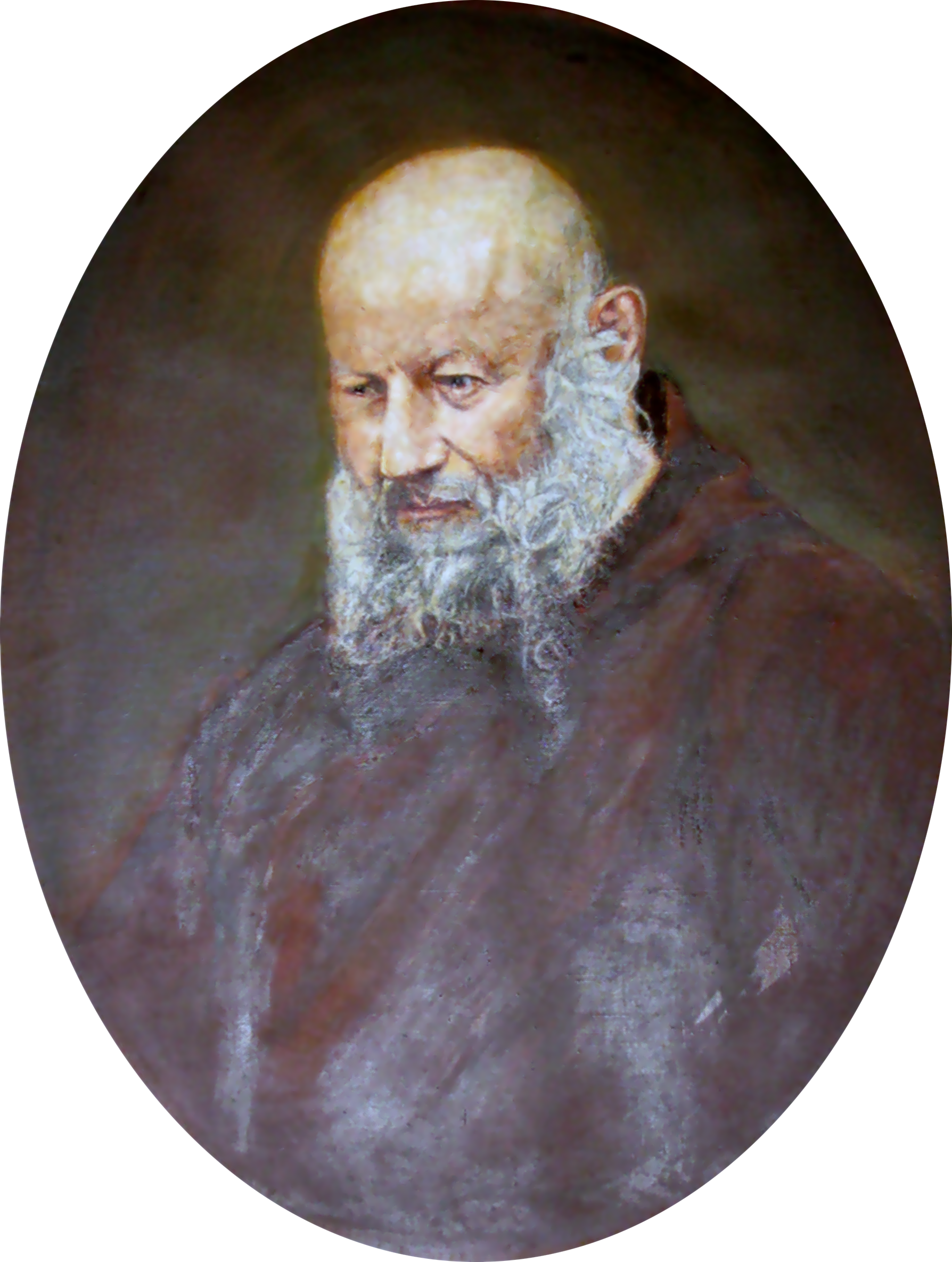
Bl. Honorat Koźmiński, O.F.M.Cap

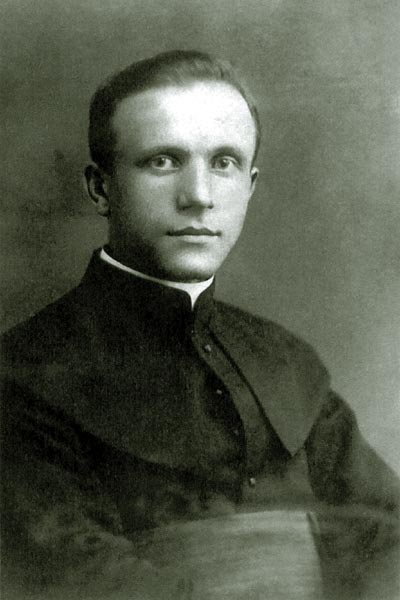
Bl. Michał Sopoćko

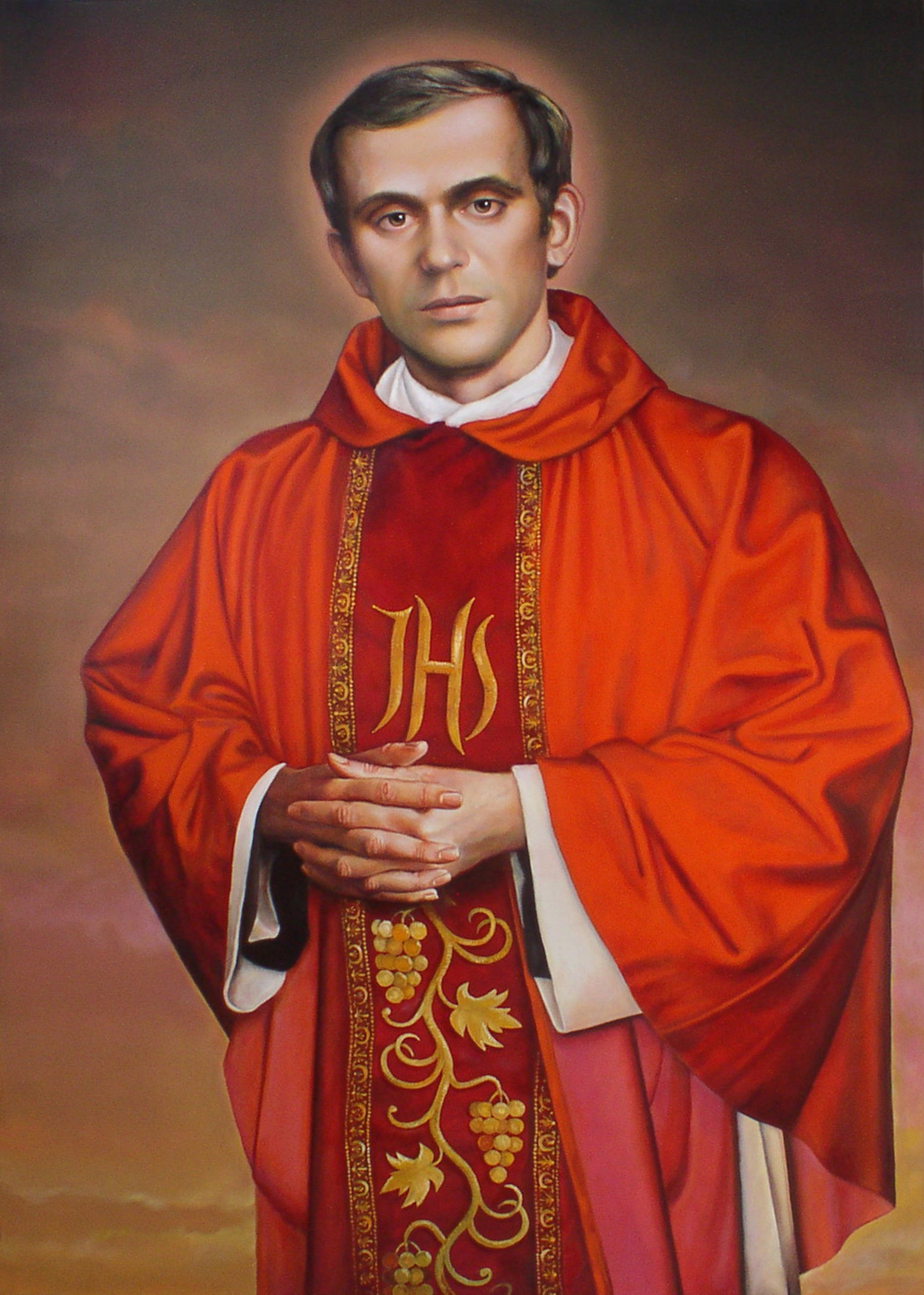
Bl. Jerzy Popiełuszko

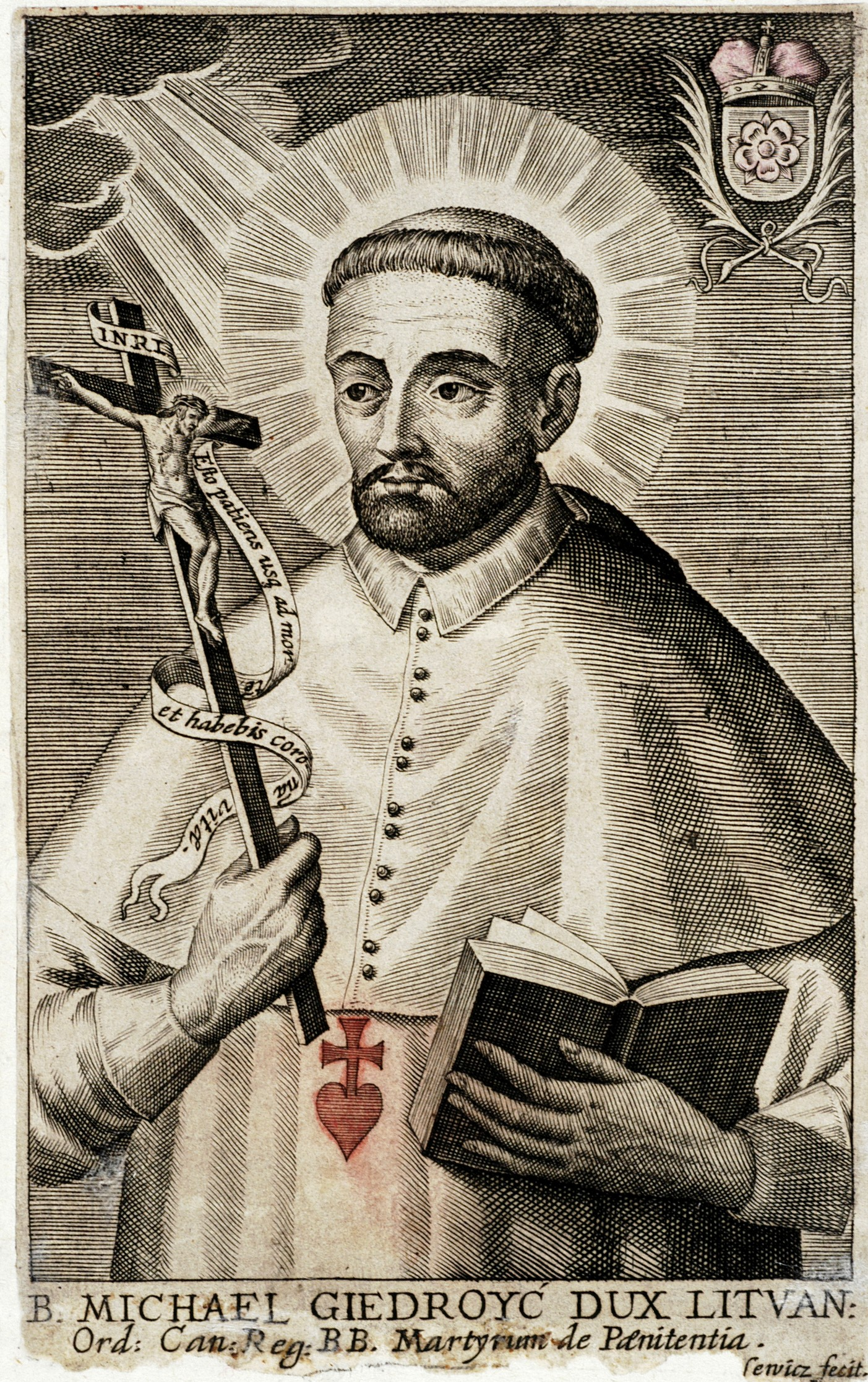
Bl. Michał Giedroyć

- Salomea (c. 1211/1212 - 1268), Professed Religious of the Poor Clare Nuns (? – Krakow, Poland)
  - Beatified: 17 May 1673 by Pope Innocent XI (confirmation of cultus)
- Czesław Odrowąż (c. 1175–1242), Professed Priest of the Dominicans (Kamień Śląski, Poland - Wrocław, Poland)
  - Beatified: 27 August 1712 by Pope Clement XI (confirmation of cultus)
- Ladislas of Gielniów (c. 1440 – 1505), Professed Priest of the Order of Friars Minor (Gniezo, Poland)
  - Beatified: 11 February 1750 by Pope Benedict XIV (confirmation of cultus)
- Wincenty Kadłubek (c. 1150–1223), Professed Priest of the Cistercians; Bishop of Kraków (Opatów – Jędrzejów, Poland)
  - Beatified: 18 February 1764 by Pope Clement XIII (confirmation of cultus)
- Jakub Strzemię (c. 1340 - 1409), Professed Priest of the Order of Friars Minor, Archbishop of Halicz (Galicia, Poland - Lviv, Ukraine)
  - Beatified: 11 September 1790 by Pope Pius VI (confirmation of cultus)
- Jolanta (1235–1298), Professed Religious of the Poor Clare Nuns (Esztergom, Hungary – Gniezno, Poland)
  - Beatified: 26 September 1827 by Pope Leo XII (confirmation of cultus)
- Bronisława (c. 1200–1259), Professed Religious of the Premonstratensian Nuns (Chełm – Kraków, Poland)
  - Beatified: 23 August 1839 by Pope Gregory XVI (confirmation of cultus)
- Bogumił z Dobrowa (c.1135 - 1204), Archbishop of Gniezno and hermit of the Camaldolese Order (Dobrow, Poland? - Uniedow, Poland?)
  - Beatified: 27 May 1925 by Pope Pius XI (confirmation of cultus)
- Maria Teresa Ledóchowska (1863–1922), Founder of the Missionary Sisters of Saint Peter Claver (Melk, Austria – Rome, Italy)
  - Declared "Venerable": 16 March 1970
  - Beatified: 19 October 1975 by Pope Paul VI
- Dorota of Mątowy Wielkie (1347–1394), Married Layperson of the Dioceses of Warmia and Gdańsk (Malbork – Kwidzyn, Poland)
  - Beatified: 9 January 1976 by Pope Paul VI (confirmation of cultus)
- Karolina Kózka (1898–1914), Young Layperson of the Diocese of Tarnów; Martyr (Radłów, Poland)
  - Declared "Venerable": 30 June 1986
  - Beatified: June 10, 1987
- Michał Kozal (1893–1943), Auxiliary Bishop of Włocławek; Martyr (Krotoszyn, Poland – Oberbayern, Germany)
  - Declared "Venerable": 8 May 1987
  - Beatified: 14 June 1987
- Florentyn Wacław Koźmiński (Honorat of Biała) (1829–1916), Professed Priest of the Capuchin Franciscans; Founder of the following congregations; Secular Institute of the Handmaids of the Sacred Heart of Jesus, Messengers of Mary, the Handmaids of the Sacred Heart of Jesus of Lithuania, the Sisters Servants of Mary Immaculate, the Daughters of the Sorrowful Mother of God – Seraphic Sisters, the Franciscan Sisters of the Suffering, the Vestiarki Sisters of Jesus, the Sisters Servants of Jesus, the Daughters of the Most Pure Heart of Mary, the Sisters of the Sacred Name of Jesus, the Little Sisters of the Immaculate Heart of Mary – Sisters of Blessed Honorat, the Reparatrix Sisters of the Holy Face, the Auxiliary Sisters of the Atoning Souls, the Daughters of Mary Immaculate – Immaculatine Sisters, the Sons of Our Lady of Sorrows, Sisters Consolers of the Sacred Heart of Jesus, and the Sisters Servants of the Mother of the Good Shepherd (Biała Podlaska – Grójec, Poland)
  - Declared "Venerable": 16 March 1987
  - Canonized: 16 October 1988 by Pope John Paul II
- Maria Franciszka Siedliska (Maria of Jesus the Good Shepherd) (1842–1902), Founder of the Sisters of the Holy Family of Nazareth (Rzeczyca, Poland – Rome, Italy)
  - Declared "Venerable": 29 April 1980
  - Beatified: 23 April 1989 by Pope John Paul II
- Bolesława Maria Lament (1862–1946), Founder of the Missionary Sisters of the Holy Family (Łowicz – Białystok, Poland)
  - Declared "Venerable": 22 January 1991
  - Beatified: 5 June 1991 by Pope John Paul II
- Aniela Salawa (1881–1922), Layperson of the Archdiocese of Kraków; Member of the Secular Franciscans (Myślenice – Kraków, Poland)
  - Declared "Venerable": 23 October 1987
  - Beatified: 13 August 1991 by Pope John Paul II
- Melchor Chyliński (Rafał) (1694–1741), Professed Priest of the Conventual Franciscans (Poznań – Łagiewniki, Poland)
  - Declared "Venerable": 13 May 1949
  - Beatified: 9 June 1991 by Pope John Paul II
- Zofia Angela Truszkowska (Maria Angela) (1825–1899), Founder of the Sisters of Saint Felix of Cantalice (Felician Sisters) (Kalisz – Kraków, Poland)
  - Declared "Venerable": 2 April 1982
  - Beatified: 18 April 1993 by Pope John Paul II
- Marcelina Darowska (Maria Marcelina of the Immaculate Conception) (1827–1911), Widow; Cofounder of the Sisters of the Immaculate Conception of the Blessed Virgin (Zhashkiv – Buchach, Ukraine)
  - Declared "Venerable": 15 December 1994
  - Beatified: 6 October 1996 by Pope John Paul II
- Maria Karłowska (Maria of Jesus Crucified) (1865–1935), Founder of the Sisters of the Divine Shepherd of Divine Providence (Kcynia – Chełmno, Poland)
  - Declared "Venerable": 11 July 1995
  - Beatified: 6 June 1997 by Pope John Paul II
- Maria Jabłońska (Bernardyna) (1886–1940), Founder of the Sisters Servants of the Poor – Albertine Sisters (Narol – Kraków, Poland)
  - Declared "Venerable": 17 December 1996
  - Beatified: 6 June 1997 by Pope John Paul II
- Stefan Wincenty Frelichowski (1913–1945), Priest of the Diocese of Toruń; Martyr (Kujawsko Pomorskie, Poland – Oberbayern, Germany)
  - Declared "Venerable": 26 March 1999
  - Beatified: 7 June 1999 by Pope John Paul II
- Regina Protmann (1552–1613), Founder of the Sisters of Saint Catherine, Virgin and Martyr (Braniewo, Poland)
  - Declared "Venerable": 17 December 1996
  - Beatified: 13 June 1999 by Pope John Paul II
- Edmund Bojanowski (1814–1871), Layperson of the Archdiocese of Poznań; Founder of the Sisters Servants of Mary Immaculate, the Sisters Servants of the Holy and Immaculate Virgin Mary, the Little Servant Sisters of the Immaculate Conception and the Sisters Servants of the Mother of God, Virgin Immaculate Conception (Gostyń – Leszno, Poland)
  - Declared "Venerable": 3 July 1998
  - Beatified: 13 June 1999 by Pope John Paul II
- Omelyan Kovch (1884–1944), Married Priest of the Eparchy of Stanislaviv (now Ivano-Frankivsk); Martyr (Ivano-Frankivsk, Ukraine – Lublin, Poland)
  - Declared "Venerable": 24 April 2001
  - Beatified: 27 June 2001 by Pope John Paul II
- Janina Szymkowiak (Sancja) (1910–1942), Professed Religious of the Daughters of the Sorrowful Mother of God – Seraphic Sisters (Ostrów Wielkopolski – Poznań, Poland)
  - Declared "Venerable": 18 December 2000
  - Beatified: 18 August 2002 by Pope John Paul II
- Jan Wojciech Balicki (1869–1948), Priest of the Diocese of Przemyśl of the Latins (Rzeszów – Przemyśl, Poland)
  - Declared "Venerable": 15 December 1994
  - Beatified: 18 August 2002 by Pope John Paul II
- Jan Beyzym (1850–1912), Professed Priest of the Jesuits (Shepetivka, Ukraine – Fianarantsoa, Madagascar)
  - Declared "Venerable": 21 December 1992
  - Beatified: 18 August 2002 by Pope John Paul II
- Bronisław Markiewicz (1842–1912), Professed Priest and Founder of the Congregation of Saint Michael the Archangel (Michaelites) (Podkarpackie, Poland)
  - Declared "Venerable": 2 July 1994
  - Beatified: 19 June 2005 by Cardinal Józef Glemp
- Ignacy Kłopotowski (1866–1931), Priest of the Archdiocese of Warsaw; Founder of the Sisters of the Blessed Virgin Mary of Loreto (Siemiatycze – Warsaw, Poland)
  - Declared "Venerable": 20 December 2004
  - Beatified: 19 June 2005 by Cardinal Józef Glemp
- Władysław Findysz (1907–1964), Priest of the Diocese of Rzeszów; Martyr (Krosno – Jasło, Poland)
  - Declared "Venerable": 20 December 2004
  - Beatified: 19 June 2005 by Cardinal Józef Glemp
- Maria Luiza Merkert (1817–1872), Cofounder of the Sisters of Saint Elizabeth (Nysa, Poland)
  - Declared "Venerable": 20 December 2004
  - Beatified: 30 September 2007 by Cardinal José Saraiva Martins, C.M.F.
- Celina Chludzińska Borzęcka (1833–1913), Widow; Founder of the Sisters of the Resurrection (Vitebsk, Belarus – Kraków, Poland)
  - Declared "Venerable": 11 February 1982
  - Beatified: 27 October 2007 by Cardinal José Saraiva Martins, C.M.F.
- Marta Anna Wiecka (1874–1904), Vowed Member of the Daughters of Charity of Saint Vincent de Paul (Pomorskie, Poland – Ivano-Frankivs’k, Ukraine)
  - Declared "Venerable": December 20, 2004
  - Beatified: 24 May 2008 by Cardinal Tarcisio Bertone, S.D.B.
- Michał Sopoćko (1888–1975), Priest of the Archdiocese of Białystok; Founder of the Sisters of Merciful Jesus (Vilniaus rajona, Lithuania – Podlaskie, Poland)
  - Declared "Venerable": 20 December 2004
  - Beatified: 28 September 2008 by Cardinal Angelo Amato, S.D.B.
- Jerzy Popiełuszko (1947–1984), Priest of the Archdiocese of Warsaw; Martyr (Sokółka – Włocławek, Poland)
  - Declared "Venerable": 19 December 2009
  - Beatified: 6 June 2010 by Cardinal Angelo Amato, S.D.B.
- Zofia Czeska-Maciejowska (1584–1650), Founder of the Sisters of the Presentation of the Blessed Virgin Mary (Kazimierski – Kraków, Poland)
  - Declared "Venerable": 27 June 2011
  - Beatified: 9 June 2013 by Cardinal Angelo Amato, S.D.B.
- Małgorzata Szewczyk (Łucja) (C. 1828–1905), Founder of the Daughters of the Sorrowful Mother of God – Seraphic Sisters (Khmelnytskyi, Ukraine – Aleksandrów, Poland)
  - Declared "Venerable": 19 December 2011
  - Beatified: 9 June 2013 by Cardinal Angelo Amato, S.D.B.
- Ludwika Szczęsna (Klara) (1863–1916), Cofounder of the Sisters Servants of the Most Sacred Heart of Jesus (Żuromin – Kraków, Poland)
  - Declared "Venerable": 20 December 2012
  - Beatified: 27 September 2015 by Cardinal Angelo Amato, S.D.B.
- Michał Tomaszek (1960–1991), Professed Priest of the Conventual Franciscans; Martyr (Żywiec, Poland – Ancash, Peru)
  - Declared "Venerable": 3 February 2015
  - Beatified: 5 December 2015 by Cardinal Angelo Amato, S.D.B.
- Zbigniew Adam Strzałkowski (1958–1991), Professed Priest of the Conventual Franciscans; Martyr (Tarnów, Poland – Ancash, Peru)
  - Declared "Venerable": 3 February 2015
  - Beatified: 5 December 2015 by Cardinal Angelo Amato, S.D.B.
- Hanna Helena Chrzanowska (1902–1973), Layperson of the Archdiocese of Kraków; Member of the Oblates of Saint Benedict (Warsaw – Kraków, Poland)
  - Declared "Venerable": 30 September 2015
  - Beatified: 28 April 2018 by Cardinal Angelo Amato, S.D.B.
- Michał Giedroyć [Mykolas Giedraitis] (c. 1420–1485), Professed Religious of the Canons Regular of the Penance of the Blessed Martyrs (Molėtai, Lithuania – Kraków, Poland)
  - Beatified: 7 November 2018 by Pope Francis (confirmation of cultus)
- Róża Czacka (Elżbieta) (1876–1961), Founder of the Franciscan Sisters, Servants of the Cross (Kiev, Ukraine – Warsaw, Poland)
  - Declared "Venerable": 9 October 2017
  - Beatified: 12 September 2021 by Cardinal Marcello Semeraro
- Stefan Wyszyński (1901–1981), Archbishop of Gniezno and Warsaw; Cardinal (Ostrów Mazowiecka – Warsaw, Poland)
  - Declared "Venerable": 18 December 2017
  - Beatified: 12 September 2021 by Cardinal Marcello Semeraro
- Jan Franciszek Macha (1914–1942), Professed Priest; Martyr (Chorzów – Katowice, Poland)
  - Declared "Venerable": 28 November 2019
  - Beatified: 20 November 2021 by Cardinal Marcello Semeraro
- Michał Rapacz (1904–1946), Priest of the Archdiocese of Kraków; Martyr (Myślenice – Chrzanów, Poland)
  - Declared "Venerable": 24 January 2024
  - Beatified: 15 June 2024 by Cardinal Marcello Semeraro
- Stanisław Streich (1902–1938), Priest of the Archdiocese of Poznań; Martyr (Bydgoszcz – Poznań, Poland)
  - Declared "Venerable": 23 May 2024
  - Beatified: 24 May 2025 by Cardinal Marcello Semeraro

== Venerables ==
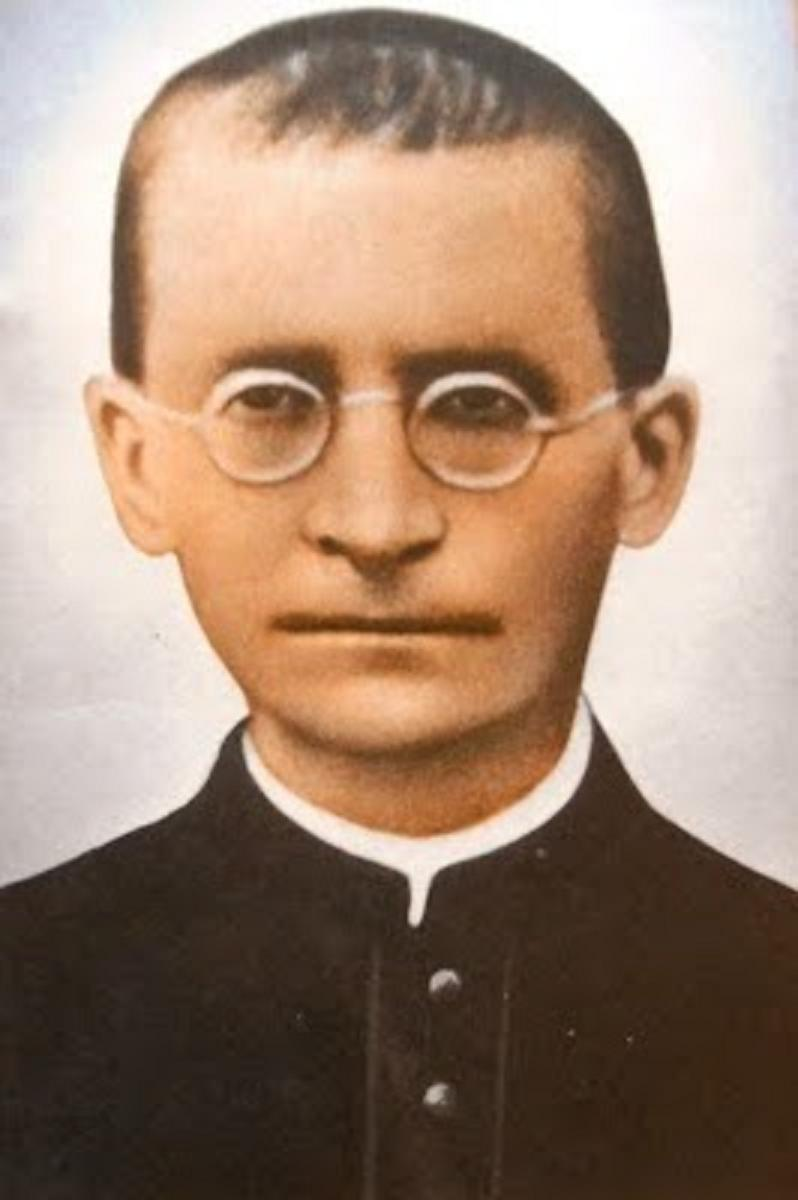
Father Rudolf Komórek, S.D.B.

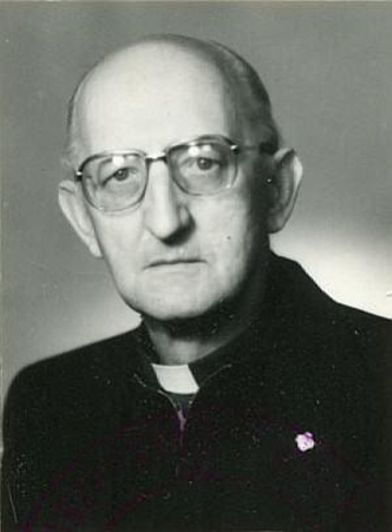
Father Franciszek Blachnicki

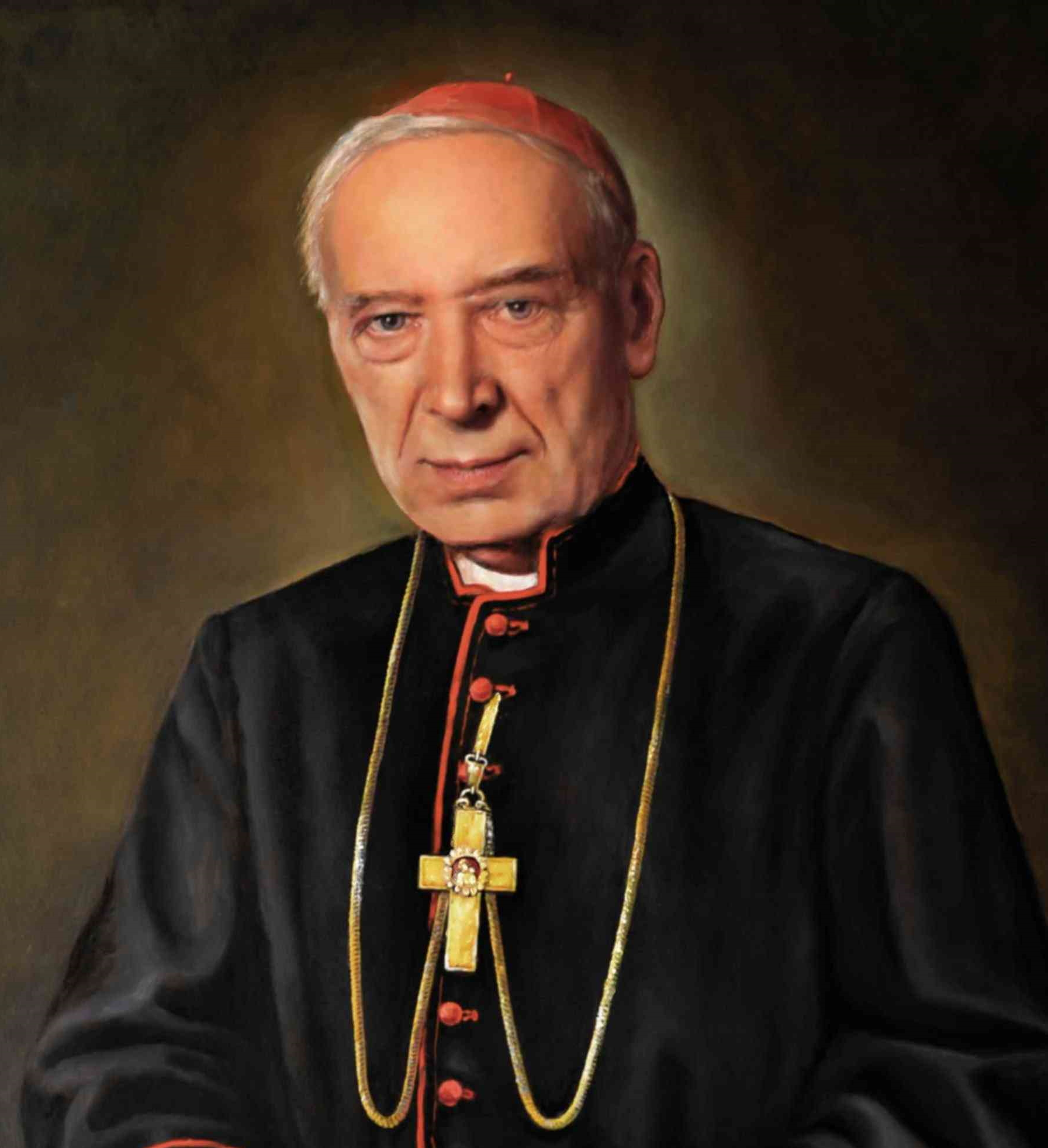
Cardinal Stefan Wyszyński

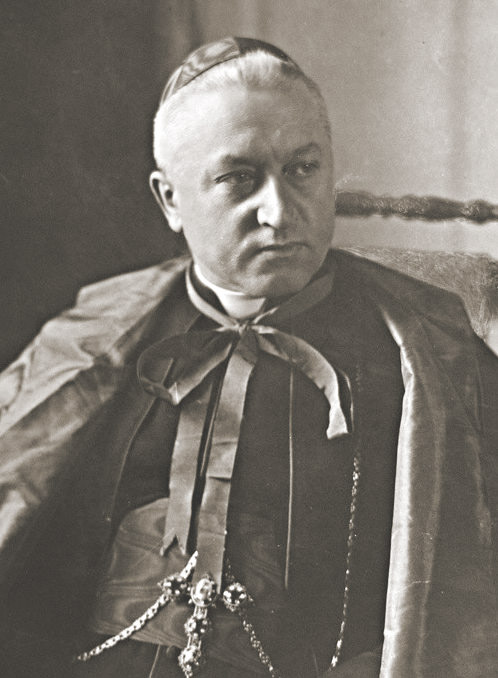
Cardinal August Hlond

- Jadwiga Borzęcka (1863–1906), Cofounder of the Sisters of the Resurrection (Grodno, Belarus – Kęty, Poland)
  - Declared "Venerable": 17 December 1982
- Józefina Dudzik (Mary Theresa) (1860–1918), Founder of the Franciscan Sisters of Chicago (Sępólno, Poland – Illinois, United States)
  - Declared "Venerable": March 26, 1994
- Rudolf Komórek (1890–1949), Professed Priest of the Salesians of Don Bosco (Bielsko-Biała, Poland – São Paulo, Brazil)
  - Declared "Venerable": April 6, 1995
- Piotr Osmołowski (Hadrian) (1838–1924), Professed Priest of the Franciscan Friars Minor (Gomel, Belarus – Vicenza, Italy)
  - Declared "Venerable": July 1, 2000
- Róża Filipa Białecka (Róża Kolumba) (1838–1887), Founder of the Sisters of Saint Dominic (Dominican Sisters of Poland) (Lviv, Ukraine – Kraków, Poland)
  - Declared "Venerable": December 20, 2004
- Robert Spiske (1821–1888), Priest of the Diocese of Wrocław; Founder of the Sisters of Saint Hedwig (Strzelce – Wrocław, Poland)
  - Declared "Venerable": January 17, 2009
- Antoni Kowalczyk (1866–1947), Professed Religious of the Missionary Oblates of Mary Immaculate (Krotoszyn, Poland – Alberta, Canada)
  - Declared "Venerable": March 26, 2013
- Janina Kierocińska (Maria Teresa) (1885–1946), Founder of the Carmelite Sisters of the Child Jesus (Wieluń – Sosnowiec, Poland)
  - Declared "Venerable": May 3, 2013
- Jerzy Ciesielski (1929–1970), Married Layperson of the Archdiocese of Kraków; Member of the Focolare Movement (Kraków, Poland – Nile River, Egypt)
  - Declared "Venerable": December 17, 2013
- Jadwiga Jaroszewska (Wincenta of the Passion of the Lord) (1900–1937), Founder of the Benedictine Samaritan Sisters of the Cross of Christ (Piotrków Trybunalski – Warsaw, Poland)
  - Declared "Venerable": March 18, 2015
- Franciszek Blachnicki (1921–1987), Priest of the Diocese of Katowice; Founder of the Secular Institute of the Immaculate Mother of the Church (Rybnik, Poland – Bad Dürkheim, Germany)
  - Declared "Venerable": September 30, 2015
- Maria Magdalena Kalb (Emanuela) (1899–1986), Professed Religious of the Canonesses of the Holy Spirit of Sassia (Jarosław – Kraków, Poland)
  - Declared "Venerable": 14 December 2015
- Józef Katarzyniec (Wenanty) (1889–1921), Professed Religious of the Franciscan Conventuals (Lviv, Ukraine – Przemyśl, Poland)
  - Declared "Venerable": 26 April 2016
- Maria Nastał (Leonia) (1903–1940), Professed Religious of the Little Servant Sisters of the Immaculate Conception (Brzozów, Poland)
  - Declared "Venerable": 1 December 2016
- Jan Leopold Tyranowski (1901–1947), Layperson of the Archdiocese of Kraków (Kraków, Poland)
  - Declared "Venerable": 20 January 2017
- Piotr Kosiba (1855–1939), Professed Religious of the Franciscan Friars Minor (Gorlice – Wieliczka, Poland)
  - Declared "Venerable": 7 July 2017
- Bernard Alojzy Łubieński (1846–1933), Professed Priest of the Redemptorists (Żyrardów – Warsaw, Poland)
  - Declared "Venerable": 6 March 2018
  - Declared "Venerable": 19 May 2018
- August Józef Hlond (1881–1948), Professed Priest of the Salesians of Don Bosco; Archbishop of Gniezno and Warsaw; Cardinal; Founder of the Society of Christ for Poles Living Abroad (Mysłowice – Warsaw, Poland)
  - Declared "Venerable": 19 May 2018
- Józef Fordon (Melchior) (1862–1927), Professed Priest of the Franciscan Conventuals (Grodno, Belarus)
  - Declared "Venerable": 21 December 2018
- Jan Pietraszko (1911–1988), Titular Bishop of Torreblanda; Auxiliary Bishop of Kraków (Bielsko – Kraków, Poland)
  - Declared "Venerable": 21 December 2018
- Anna Kaworek (1872–1936), Cofounder of the Sisters of Saint Michael the Archangel (Głogówek – Krosno, Poland)
  - Declared "Venerable": 15 January 2019
- Władysław Korniłowicz (1884–1946), Priest of the Archdiocese of Warsaw (Warsaw, Poland)
  - Declared "Venerable": 5 July 2019

== Servants of God ==
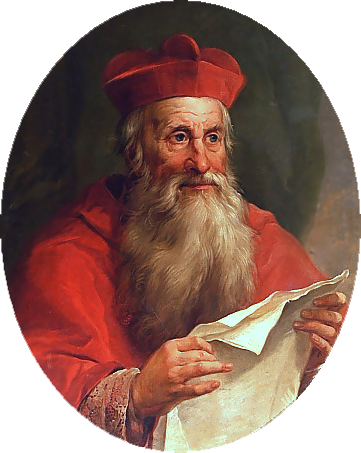
Cardinal Stanislaus Hosius

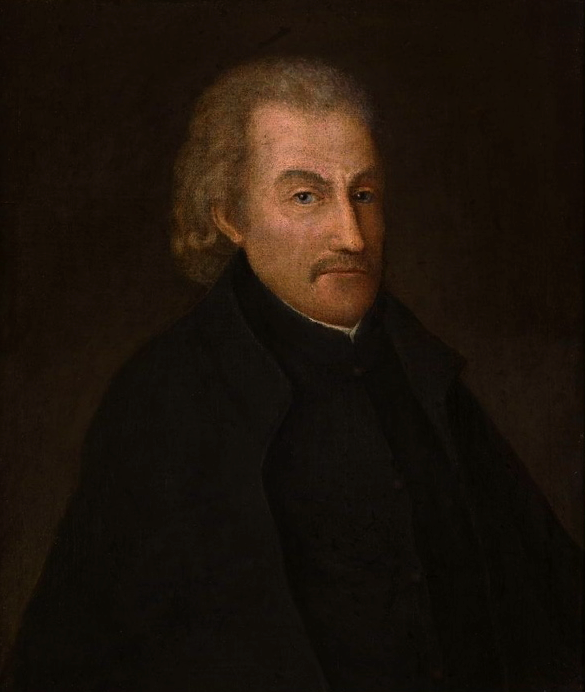
Father Piotr SkargaS.J.

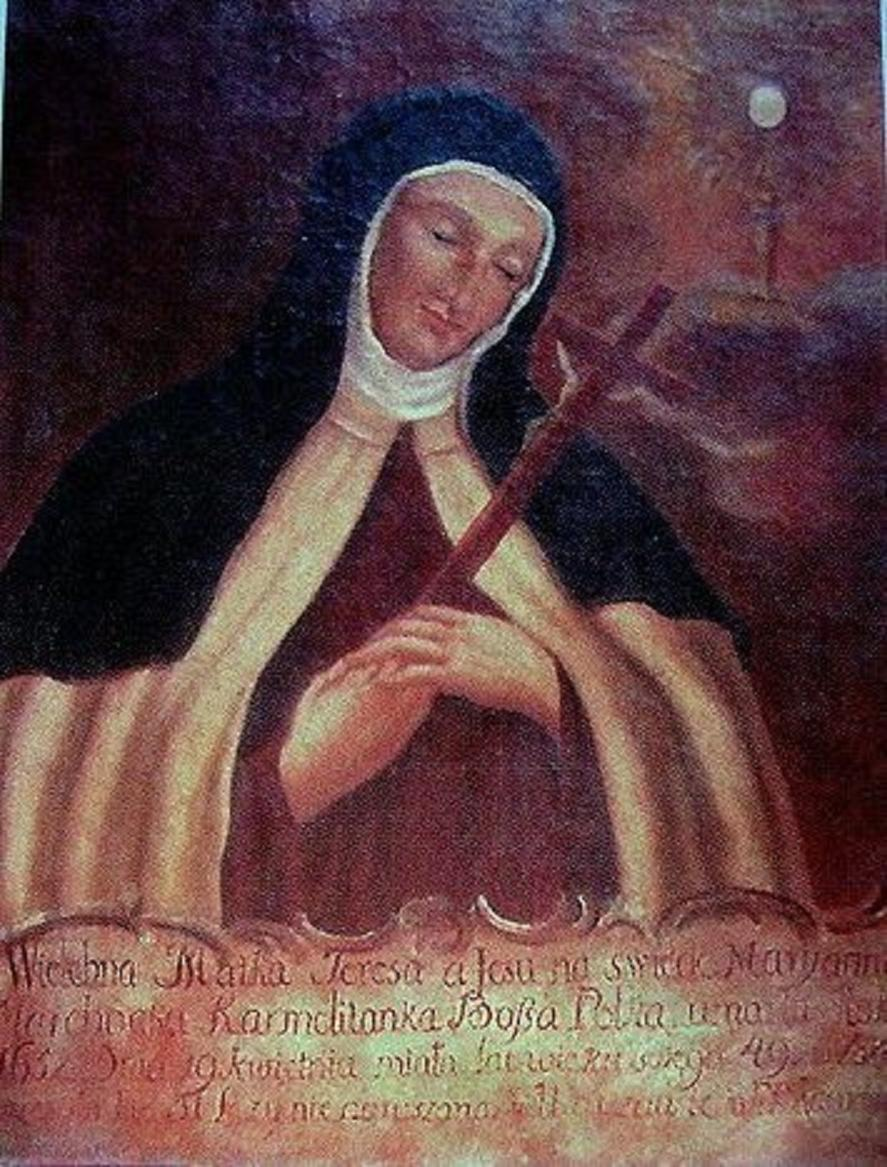
Mother Anna Maria Marchocka, O.C.D.

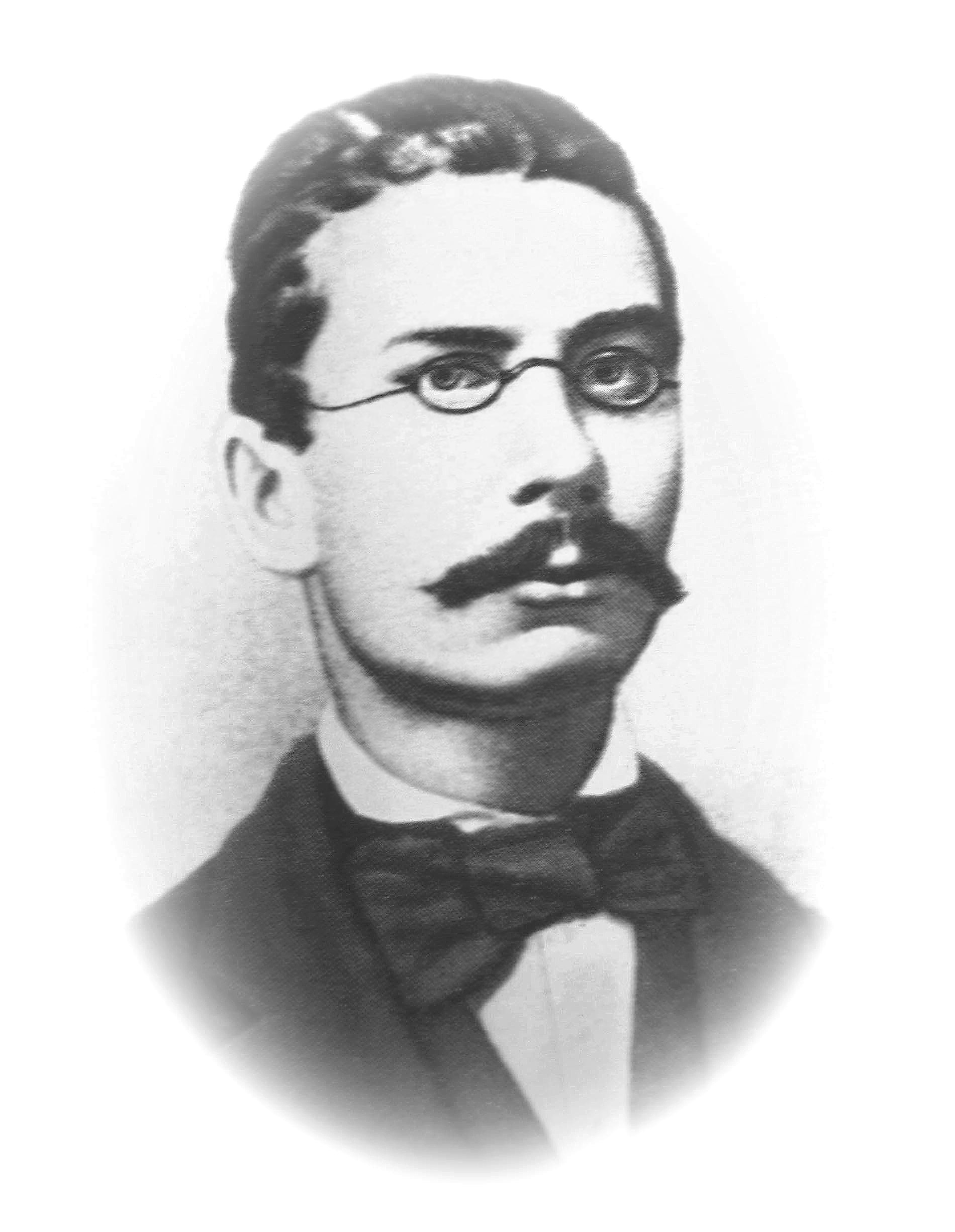
Romuald Traugutt

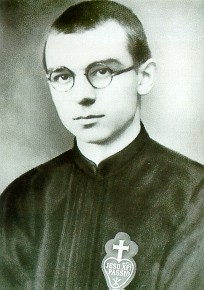
Father Bernard Kryszkiewicz, C.P.

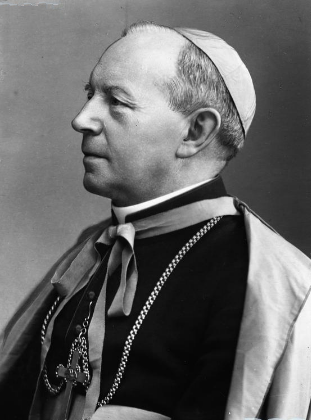
Bishop Adolf Piotr Szelążek

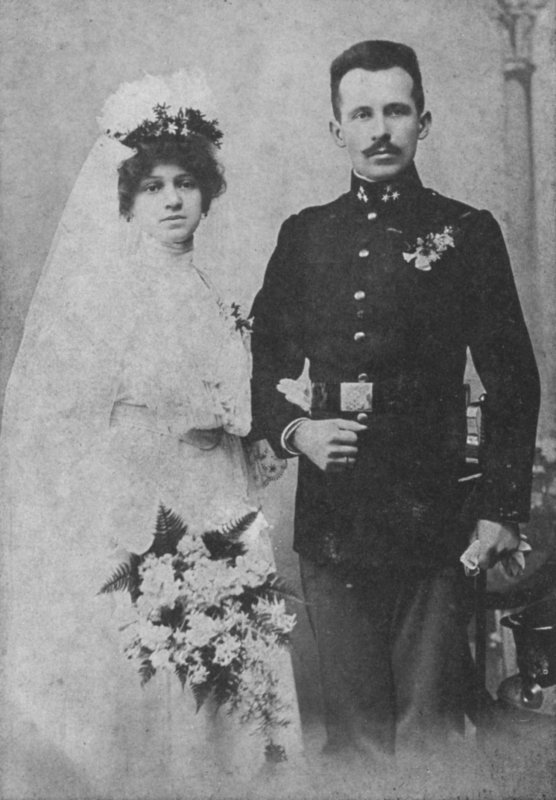
Emilia and Karol Wojtyla

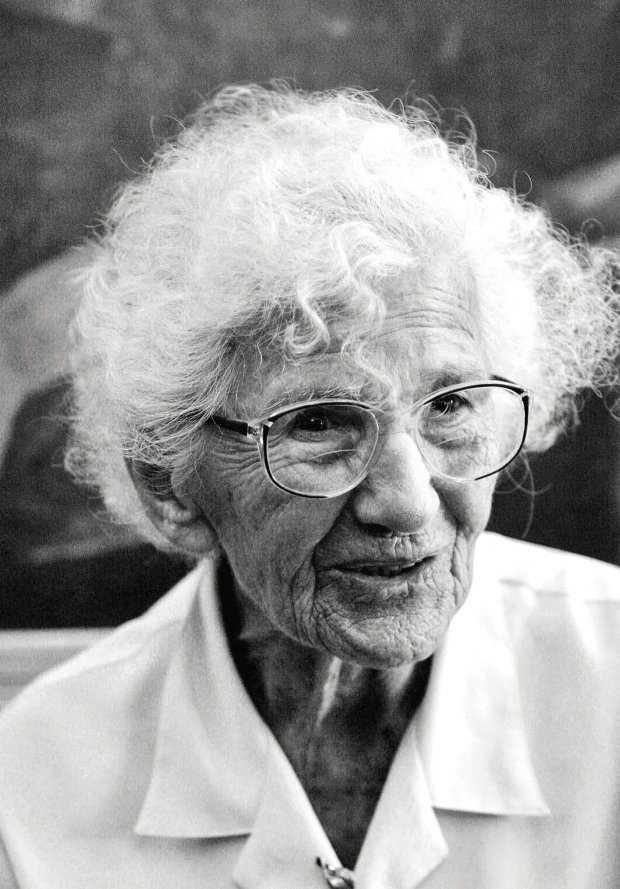
Wanda Błeńska

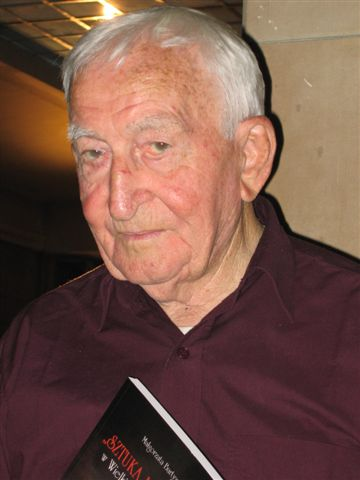
Father Marian Zelazek, S.V.D.

- Henryk II Pobożny (c. 1196–1241), Married Layperson of the Diocese of Legnica (Wrocław – Legnica, Poland)
- Euphemia of Racibórz (c. 1299–1359), Professed Religious of the Dominican Nuns (Racibórz, Poland)
- Izajasz Boner (c. 1400–1477), Professed Priest of the Augustinians (Kraków, Poland)
- Mikołaj Kopernik (1473–1543), Professed Canon of Warmia, mathematician and astronomer who formulized the Heliocentric Theory
- Świętosław Milczący (d. 1489), Priest of the Archdiocese of Kraków (Będzin – Kraków, Poland)
- Stanisław Hozjusz (1504–1579), Bishop of Warmia; Cardinal (Kraków, Poland – Rome, Italy)
- Błażej Pęcharek (Bernard of Wąbrzeźno) (c. 1587–1603), Professed Priest of the Benedictines (Annunciation Congregation) (Wąbrzeźno – Kościan, Poland)
- Piotr Skarga (1536–1612), Professed Priest of the Jesuits (Grójec – Kraków, Poland)
- Magdalena Mortęska (c. 1554–1631), Professed Religious of the Benedictine Nuns (Grudziądz – Chełmno, Poland)
- Marianna Marchocka (Teresa of Jesus) (1603–1652), Professed Religious of the Discalced Carmelite Nuns (Tarnów – Warsaw, Poland)
- Bogdan Jański (1807–1840), Layperson of the Diocese of Płock; Cofounder of the Resurrection (Resurrectionists) (Podlaskie, Poland – Rome, Italy)
- Józefa Karska (Maria Józefa of Jesus Crucified) (1823–1860), Cofounder of the Sisters of the Immaculate Conception of the Blessed Virgin (Wierzbica, Poland – Rome, Italy)
- Romuald Traugutt (1826–1864), Layperson of the Archdiocese of Warsaw (Brest, Belarus – Warsaw, Poland)
- Wawrzyniec Kuśniak (1788–1866), Priest of the Oratorians (Gostyń Congregation) (Czarnków-Trzcianka – Gostyń, Poland)
- Johannes [Jan] Schneider (1824–1876), Priest of the Diocese of Wrocław; Founder of the Sisters of Mary Immaculate of Wrocław (Prudnik – Wrocław, Poland)
- Piotr Semenenko (1814–1886), Priest and Cofounder of the Congregation of the Resurrection (Resurrectionists); Founder of the Sisters of the Resurrection (Podlaskie, Poland – Paris, France)
- Emilia Podoska (1845–1889), Professed Religious of the Premonstratensian Nuns (Wieliczka – Kraków, Poland)
- Maria Aniela Witkowsk (Franciszka) (1866–1895), Cofounder of the Sisters of the Sacred Name of Jesus (Vileyka, Belarus – Otwock, Poland)
- Wanda Justyna Nepomucena Malczewska (1822–1896), Layperson of the Archdiocese of Łódź (Radom – Bełchatów, Poland)
- Marcjanna Mirska (Antonina) (1822–1905), Founder of the Sisters of Divine Providence of Pyzemyśl (Pyzemyśl, Poland – Lviv, Ukraine)
- Ludwika Nałęcz-Morawska (Maria of the Cross) (1842–1906), Professed Religious of the Poor Clares of Perpetual Adoration (Wielkopolskie, Poland – Alpes-Maritimes, France)
- Wincenty Kluczyński (1847–1917), Archbishop of Mohilev; Apostolic Administrator of Minsk; Founder of the Sisters of the Angels (Vitebsk, Belarus – Yalta, Ukraine)
- Walentyna Łempicka (Maria of the Sacred Heart of Jesus) (1833–1918), Professed Religious of the Capuchin Poor Clare Nuns (Kujawsko-Pomoskie – Kęty, Poland)
- Josef Engling (1898–1918), Young Layperson of the Diocese of Trier; Member of the Schönstatt Movement (Bartoszyce, Poland – Nord, France)
- Józef Kruszewski (Wincenty) (1854–1922), Professed Priest of the Carmelites of the Ancient Observance (Płonsk – Golub-Dobrzyń, Poland)
- Jadwiga Zamoyska (1831–1923), Married Layperson of the Archdiocese of Poznań (Warsaw – Poznań, Poland)
- Jan Cieplak (1857–1926), Apostolic Administrator of Mohilev; Archbishop of Vilnius (Dąbrowa Górnicza – New Jersey, United States)
- Wojciech Maria Baudiss (1842–1926), Professed Priest of the Jesuits (Chernivtsi, Ukraine – Brzozów, Poland)
- Paweł Klemens Smolikowski (1849–1926), Professed Priest of the Resurrectionists (Tver, Russia – Kraków, Poland)
- Kazimiera Gruszczyńska (1848–1927), Founder of the Franciscan Sisters of Suffering (Kozienice, Poland)
- Edward Woyniłłowicz (1847–1928), Married Layperson of the Archdiocese of Minsk-Mohilev (Minsk, Belarus – Bydgoszcz, Poland)
- Emilia Kaczorowska Wojtyła (1884–1929), Married Layperson of the Archdiocese of Kraków (Kraków – Wadowice, Poland)
- Piotr Borowy (1858–1932), Layperson of the Archdiocese of Kraków (Námestovo, Slovakia – Nowy Targ, Poland)
- Czesław Lewandowski (1864–1934), Priest of the Congregation of the Mission (Vincentians) (Dolnośląskie – Kraków, Poland)
- Kazimierz Rolewski (1887–1936), Priest of the Archdiocese of Poznań (Poznań, Poland)
- Helena Joanna Hoffmann (Maria Dulcissima) (1910–1936), Professed Religious of the Sisters of Mary Immaculate of Wrocław (Świętochłowice – Racibórz, Poland)
- Aniela Róża Godecka (1861–1937), Cofounder of the Little Sisters of the Immaculate Heart of Mary – Sisters of Blessed Honorat (Mazowieckie – Śląskie, Poland)
- Wojciech Owczarek (1875–1938), Auxiliary Bishop of Włocławek; Founder of the Sisters of the Common Labor of Mary Immaculate (Poddębice – Otwock, Poland)
- Alfons Mańka (1917–1941), Professed Cleric of the Missionary Oblates of Mary Immaculate; Martyr (Lubliniec – Perg, Austria)
- Karol Wojtyła Sr. (1879–1941), Married Layperson of the Archdiocese Kraków (Bielsko-Biała – Kraków, Poland)
- Marcjanna Grzanka (1882–1941), Layperson of the Diocese of Sosnowiec (Olkusz – Sosnowiec, Poland)
- Konstantyn Dominik (1870–1942), Auxiliary Bishop of Chełmno [Pelplin] (Puck – Gdańsk, Poland)
- Gabriela Klausa (1870–1942), Founder of the Sisters of the Divine Heart of Jesus (Mysłowice, Poland – Dresden, Germany)
- Czesława Wojtczak (Maria Włodzimira) (1909–1943), Professed Religious of the Sisters of Saint Elizabeth (Ostrów Wielkopolski, Poland)
- Ludwik Wrodarczyk (1907–1943), Professed Priest of the Missionary Oblates of Mary Immaculate; Martyr (Tarnowskie Góry, Poland – Rivne, Ukraine)
- Wanda Janina Trudzińska (Longina) (1911–1944), Professed Religious of the Little Servants Sisters of the Immaculate Conception; Martyr (Ternopil, Ukraine – Hrubieszów, Poland)
- Rozalia Celakówna (1901–1944), Layperson of the Archdiocese of Kraków (Sucha – Kraków, Poland)
- Gertruda Ludwig (Leopolda) (1905–1945), Professed Religious of the Sisters of the Divine Saviour (Salvatorian Sisters); Martyr (Chorzów – Mikołów, Poland)
- Agnieszka Falkus (Stanisława) (1901–1945), Professed Religious of the Sisters of the Divine Saviour (Salvatorian Sisters); Martyr (Ruda Śląska – Mikołów, Poland)
- Paweł Kontny (1910–1945), Professed Priest of the Society of Christ for Poles Living Abroad; Martyr (Tychy – Bieruń-Lędziny, Poland)
- Zygmunt Kryszkiewicz (Bernard of the Mother of Beautiful Love) (1915–1945), Professed Priest of the Passionists (Mława – Przasnysz, Poland)
- Zofia Babiak (Roberta) (1905–1945), Professed Religious of the Little Servant Sisters of the Immaculate Conception (Stalowa Wola – Brzozów, Poland)
- Aleksander Żychliński (1889–1945), Priest of the Archdiocese of Poznań (Gniezno, Poland)
- Joanna Ewa Hałacińska (Józefa) (1867–1946), Founder of the Sisters of the Passion of Our Lord Jesus Christ (Oświęcim – Płock, Poland)
- Stefania Łącka (1914–1946), Layperson of the Diocese of Tarnow (Dąbrowa – Kraków, Poland)
- Magdalena Maria Epstein (1875–1947), Professed Religious of the Dominican Nuns (Zawiercie – Kraków, Poland)
- Adam Woroniecki (Jacek) (1878–1949), Professed Priest of the Dominicans; Founder of the Missionary Dominican Sisters of Jesus and Mary (Lublin – Kraków, Poland)
- Adolf Piotr Szelążek (1865–1950), Bishop of Lutsk; Founder of the Sisters of Saint Therese of the Child Jesus (Stoczek Łukowski – Łubianka, Poland)
- Barbara Samulowska (Stanisława) (1865–1950), Vowed Member of the Daughters of Charity of Saint Vincent de Paul (Olsztyn, Poland – Guatemala City, Guatemala)
- Laura Meozzi (1873–1951), Professed Religious of the Daughters of Mary, Help of Christians (Salesian Sisters) (Florence, Italy – Racibórz, Poland)
- Kunegunda Siwiec (1876–1955), Layperson of the Archdiocese of Kraków; Member of the Secular Carmelites (Suski, Poland)
- Kazimierz Antoni Hołoga (1913–1958), Married Layperson of the Archdiocese of Poznań (Poznań, Poland)
- Józef Andrasz (1891–1963), Professed Priest of the Jesuits (Nowy Sącz – Kraków, Poland)
- Zygfryd Berezecki (1907–1963), Priest of the Diocese of Lublin (Lubeskie, Poland)
- Paula Tajber (Zofia) (1890–1963), Founder of the Sisters of the Most Holy Soul of Christ (Lubelskie – Wielkopolskie, Poland)
- Józef Górszczyk (1931–1964), Professed Priest of the Piarists; Martyr (Limanowa – Jelenia Góra, Poland)
- Aleksander Fedorowicz (1914–1965), Priest of the Archdiocese of Warsaw (Poltava, Ukraine – Warsawm Poland)
- Ludwika Banaś (Maria Małgorzata of the Sacred Heart of Jesus in Agony in the Garden) (1896–1966), Professed Religious of the Sisters of the Holy Family of Nazareth (Wadowice, Poland – Grodno, Belarus)
- Józef Małysiak (Czesław Chryzostom) (1884–1966), Professed Priest of the Salvatorians; Founder of the Sisters of the Family of Bethany (Żywiec – Trzebnica, Poland)
- Ignacy Świrski (1885–1968), Bishop of Siedlce (Daugavpils, Latvia – Siedlce, Poland)
- Maciej Józef Gądek (Anzelm of Saint Andrew Corsini) (1884–1969), Professed Priest of the Discalced Carmelites; Founder of the Carmelite Sisters of the Child Jesus (Gdów – Łódź, Poland)
- Stanisława Leszczyńska (1896–1974), Married Layperson of the Diocese of Łódź (Łódź, Poland)
- Franciszek Świątek (Pranas Sviontek) (1889–1976), Priest of the Archdiocese of Vilnius (Dąbrowa, Poland – Vilnius, Lithuania)
- Anna Jenke (1921–1976), Layperson of the Diocese of Przemśyl (Rzeszów – Jarosław, Poland)
- Józef Kurzeja (1937–1976), Priest of the Archdiocese of Kraków (Kamienica – Kraków, Poland)
- Roman Kotlarz (1928–1976), Priest of the Diocese of Radom; Martyr (Staszow – Radom, Poland)
- Antoni Baraniak (1904–1977), Professed Priest of the Salesians of Don Bosco; Archbishop of Poznań (Śrem – Poznań, Poland)
- Janina Woynarowska (1923–1979), Layperson of the Archiocese of Kraków; Professed Member of the Secular Institute of Christ the Redeemer (Nowy Sącz – Kraków Poland)
- Wincenty Granat (1900–1979), Priest of the Diocese of Sandomierz (Ostrowiec – Sandomierz, Poland)
- Piotr Gołębiowski (1902–1980), Apostolic Administrator of Sandomierz (Radom – Puławy, Poland)
- Stanisław Sudoł (1895–1981), Priest of the Diocese of Sandomierz (Kolbuszowa, Poland)
- Władysław Żebrowski (Zenon) (1891–1982), Professed Priest of the Franciscan Conventuals (Czarnia, Poland – Tokyo, Japan)
- Feliks Taranek (Franciszek Marian) (1915–1982), Professed Religious of the Brothers of the Christian Schools (De La Salle Brothers) (Pajęczno – Częstochowa, Poland)
- Maria Zofia Szymanowska (1910–1983), Layperson of the Diocese of Kalisz (Vinnytsya, Ukraine – Konin, Poland)
- Aleksander Woźny (1910–1983), Priest of the Archdiocese of Poznań (Wielkoposlkie, Poland)
- Ignacy Posadzy (1898–1984), Priest and Cofounder of the Society of Christ for Poles Living Abroad; Founder of the Missionary Sisters of Christ the King for Poles Living Abroad (Poznań, Poland)
- Wilhelm Pluta (1910–1986), Bishop of Zielona Góra-Gorzów (Ruda Śląska – Krosno Odrzańskie, Poland)
- Bronisław Bozowski (1908–1987), Priest of the Archdiocese of Warsaw (Warsaw, Poland)
- Jan Marszałek (1907–1989), Priest of the Diocese of Bielsko–Żywiec (Myślenice – Żywiec, Poland)
- Wojciech Piwowarczyk (1929–1992), Priest of the Diocese of Kielce; Founder of the Secular Institute of Christ the King (Świętokrzyskie, Poland)
- Aleksander Zienkiewicz (1910–1995), Priest of the Archdiocese of Wrocław (Pastavy, Belarus – Wrocław, Poland)
- Stanisław Kownacki (1915–1995), Married Layperson of the Archdiocese of Kraków (Olomouc, Czech Republic – Kraków, Poland)
- Czesław Domin (1929–1996), Bishop of Koszalin-Kołobrzeg (Siemianowice Śląskie – Warsaw, Poland)
- Kazimierz Aleksandrr Hamerszmit (1916–1996), Priest of the Diocese of Ełk (Podlaskie, Poland)
- Walenty Torbiński (Gwala) (1908–1999), Professed Religious of the Dominicans (Lublin – Kraków, Poland)
- Stanisław Warzecha (Rudolf of the Transverberation of Saint Teresa) (1919–1999), Professed Priest of the Discalced Carmelites (Wadowice – Kraków, Poland)
- Urszula Napierska (1932–2001), Professed Religious of the Daughters of Mary Immaculate – Immaculatine Sisters (Jabłonowo Pomorskie – Gdańsk, Poland)
- Zygmunt Trybowski (1937–2002), Priest of the Archdiocese of Gniezno (Wejherowo – Bydgoszcz, Poland)
- Stanisław Pikon (Cherubin of the Blessed Virgin Mary) (1921–2003), Professed Priest of the Discalced Carmelites; Founder of the Secular Carmelite Institute "Elianum" (Wadowice – Kraków, Poland)
- Wanda Boniszewska (1907–2003), Professed Religious of the Sisters of the Angel (Navahrudak, Belarus – Piaseczno, Poland)
- Marian Żelazek (1918–2006), Professed Priest of the Society of the Divine Word (Poznań, Poland – Odisha, India)
- Kazimierz Stanisław Badeni (Joachim) (1912–2010), Professed Priest of the Dominicans (Brussels, Belgium – Kraków, Poland)
- Tadeusz Styczeń (1931–2010), Professed Priest of the Salvatorians (Kraków – Trzebnica, Poland)
- Wanda Błeńska (1911–2014), Layperson of the Archdiocese of Poznań (Poznań, Poland)
- Ozsvari Csaba (1963–2009), Married Layperson of the Archdiocese of Veszprém; Member of the Schōenstatt Movement (Poland)
- Henryk Kubik (Leander) (1909–1942), Professed Priest of the Benedictines (Annunciation Congregation); Martyr (Poland)
- Jan Olszanski (1907–2003), Professed Priest of the Marians of the Immaculate Conception; Bishop of Kamiaretz-Podilsky (Poland)
- Helena Majewska (1902–1967), Professed Religious of the Sisters of the Angels (Poland)
- Wilhelm Gaczel and 3 Companions (d. 1941–42), Professed Priests and Religious of the Augustinians; Martyrs (Poland-Germany)
- Fritz Michael Gerlich (1861–1934), Married Layperson of the Archdiocese of Munich-Freising; Martyr (Poland-Germany)

== Group Martyrs ==
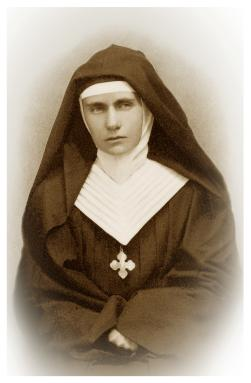
Bl. Alicja Kotowska, C.R.

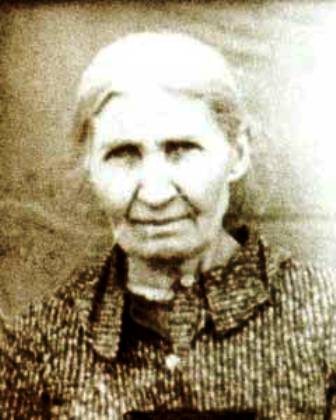
Bl. Marianna Biernacka

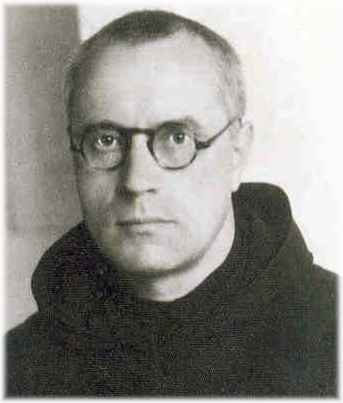
Bl. Alfons Maria Mazurek, O.C.D.

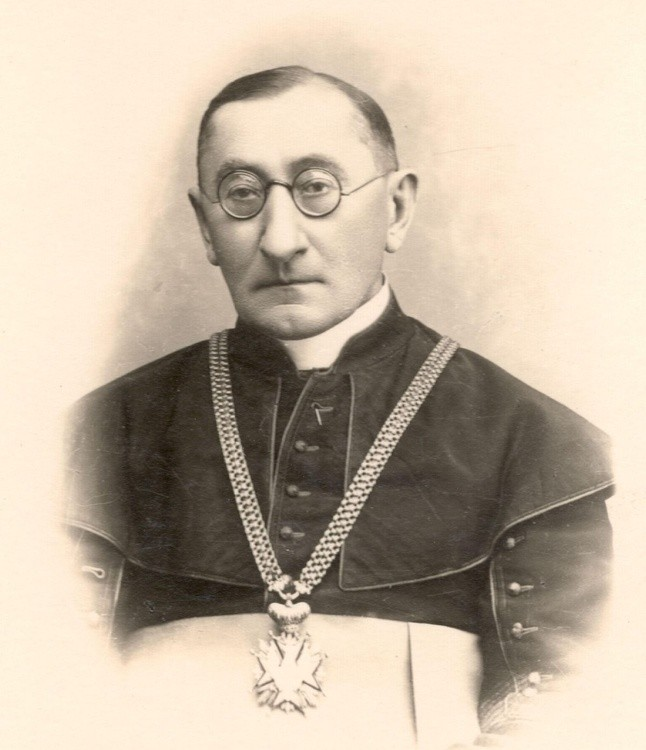
Bl. Antoni Rewera

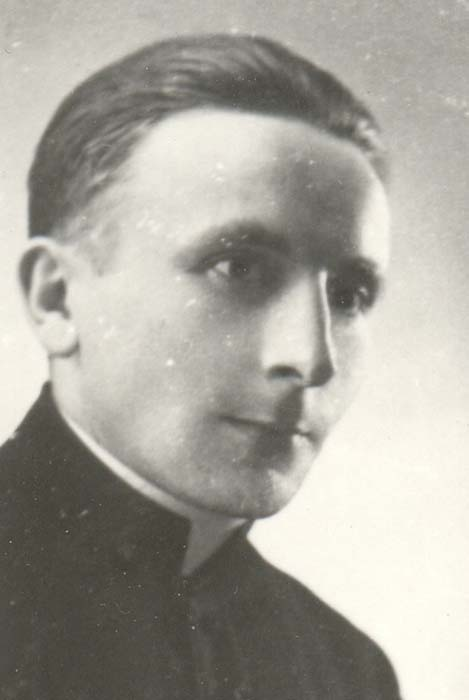
Bl. Józef Kowalski

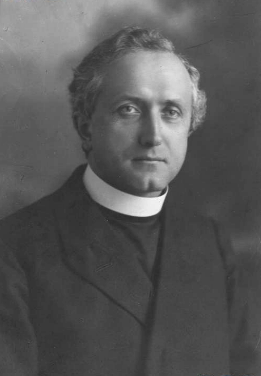
Bl. Emil Szramek

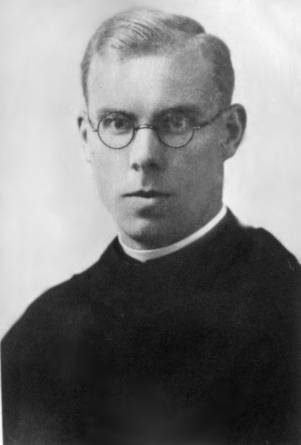
Bl. Józef Achilles Puchała

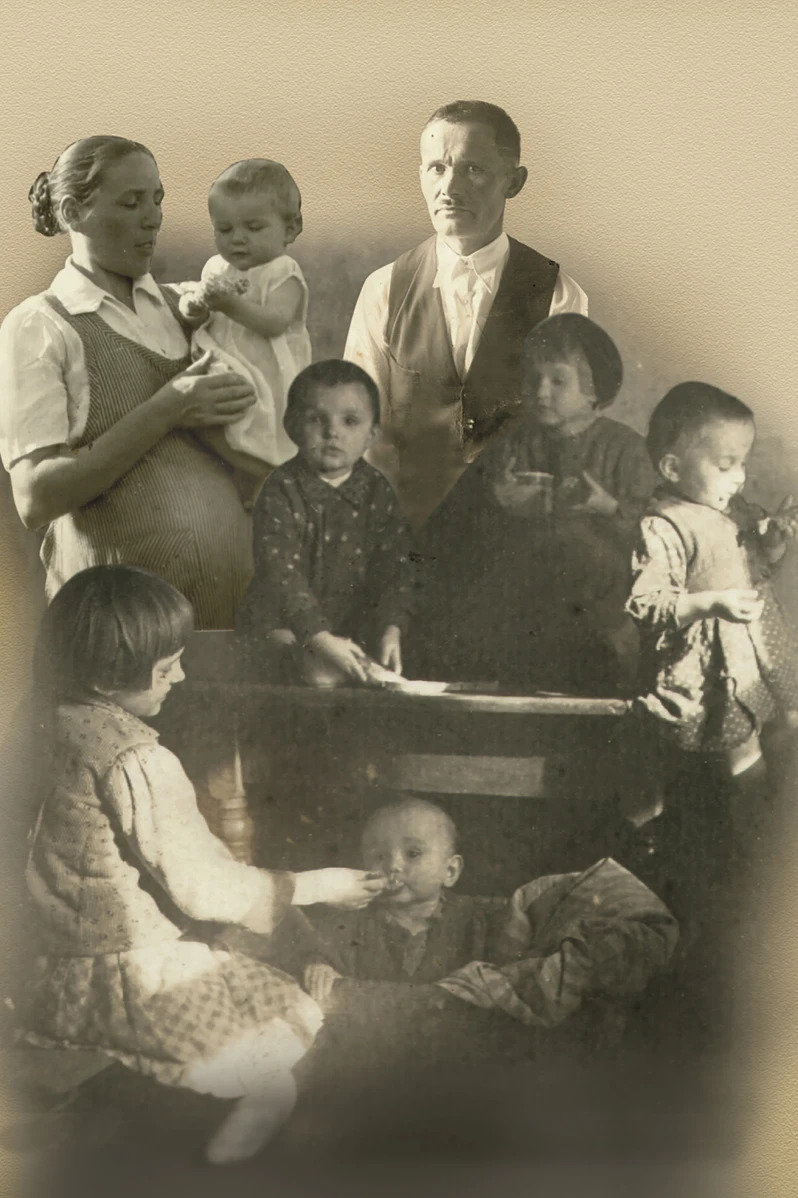
Bl. Ulma family

- 108 Blessed Polish Martyrs:
  - Marian Skrzypczak (1909–1939), Priest of the Archdiocese of Gniezno (Żnin – Inowrocław, Poland)
  - Leon Nowakowski (1913–1939), Priest of the Diocese of Włocławek (Radziejów, Poland)
  - Maria Jadwiga Kotowska (Alicja) (1899–1939), Professed Religious of the Sisters of the Resurrection (Warsaw – Piaśnica forest, Poland)
  - Franciszek Rogaczewski (1892–1940), Priest of the Archdiocese of Gdańsk (Warlubie – Nowy Dwór Gdański, Poland)
  - Marian Górecki (1903–1940), Priest of the Archdiocese of Gdańsk (Poznań – Nowy Dwór Gdański, Poland)
  - Bronisław Komorowski (1889–1940), Priest of the Archdiocese of Gdańsk (Skórcz – Nowy Dwór Gdański, Poland)
  - Stanisław Kubista (1898–1940), Professed Priest of the Society of the Divine Word (Katowice, Poland – Oranienburg, Germany)
  - Wincenty Matuszewski (1869–1940), Priest of the Diocese of Włocławek (Łanięta – Radziejów, Poland)
  - Józef Kurzawa (1910–1940), Priest of the Diocese of Włocławek (Brzeziny – Radziejów, Poland)
  - Władysław Demski (1884–1940), Priest of the Archdiocese of Gniezno (Ryjewo, Poland – Oranienburg, Germany)
  - Józef Wojciech Guz (Innocenty) (1890–1940), Professed Priest of the Franciscan Conventuals (L’viv, Ukraine – Oranienburg, Germany)
  - Włodzimierz Laskowski (1886–1940), Priest of the Archdiocese of Poznań (Rogoźno – Langenstein, Austria)
  - Zygmunt Sajna (1897–1940), Priest of the Archdiocese of Warsaw (Huszlew – Mazowieckie, Poland)
  - Michał Piaszczyński (1885–1940), Priest of the Diocese of Łomża (Łomża, Poland – Oranienburg, Germany)
  - Stefan Grelewski (1899–1941), Priest of the Diocese of Radom (Dwikozy, Poland – Oberbayern, Germany)
  - Stanisław Kostka Starowieyski (1895–1941), Married Layperson of the Archdiocese of Lublin (Wojaszówka, Poland – Oberbayern, Germany)
  - Józef Cebula (1902–1941), Professed Priest of the Missionary Oblates of Mary Immaculate (Gogolin, Poland – Perg, Austria)
  - Bolesław Strzelecki (1896–1941), Priest of the Diocese of Radom (Panemunė, Lithuania – Oświęcim, Poland)
  - Jan Eugeniusz Bajewski (Antonin) (1915–1941), Professed Priest of the Franciscan Conventuals (Vilnius, Lithuania – Oświęcim, Poland)
  - Antoni Julian Nowowiejski (1858–1941), Bishop of Płock; Titular Archbishop of Silyum (Brody – Działdowo, Poland)
  - Mieczysława Kowalska (Maria Teresa of the Child Jesus) (1902–1941), Professed Religious of the Capuchin Poor Clare Nuns (Warsaw – Działdowo, Poland)
  - Ludwik Roch Gietyngier (1904–1941), Priest of the Archdiocese of Częstochowa (Żarki, Poland – Oberbayern, Poland)
  - Leon Wetmański (1886–1941), Titular Bishop of Camchus; Auxiliary Bishop of Płock (Zuromin – Działdowo, Poland)
  - Adalbert Wojciech Kopliński (Anicet) (1875–1941), Professed Priest of the Franciscan Capuchins (Człuchów – Oświęcim, Poland)
  - Józef Jankowski (1910–1941), Consecrated Priest of the Pallotines (Brusy – Oświęcim, Poland)
  - Henryk Hlebowicz (1904–1941), Priest of the Archdiocese of Vilnius (Grodno – Minsk, Belarus)
  - Ludwik Bartosik (Pius) (1909–1941), Professed Priest of the Franciscan Conventuals (Żelazków – Oświęcim, Poland)
  - Józef Pawłowski (1890–1942), Priest of the Diocese of Kielce (Proszowice, Poland – Oberbayern, Germany)
  - Kazimierz Grelewski (1907–1942), Priest of the Diocese of Radom (Sandomierz, Poland – Oberbayern, Germany)
  - Emil Szramek (1887–1942), Priest of the Archdiocese of Katowice (Racibórz, Poland – Oberbayern, Germany)
  - Wojciech Nierychlewski (1903–1942), Professed Priest of the Congregation of Saint Michael the Archangel (Kutno – Oświęcim, Poland)
  - Ludwik Mzyk (1905–1942), Professed Priest of the Society of the Divine Word (Chorzów – Poznań, Poland)
  - Stanisław Antoni Trojanowski (Tymoteusz) (1908–1942), Professed Religious of the Franciscan Conventuals (Bieżuń – Oświęcim, Poland)
  - Mieczysław Bohatkiewicz (1904–1942), Priest of the Diocese of Pinsk (Marijampole, Lithuania – Grodno, Belarus)
  - Władysław Maćkowiak (1910–1942), Priest of the Archdiocese of Vilnius (Drohiczyn, Poland – Grodno, Belarus)
  - Stanisław Pyrtek (1913–1942), Priest of the Archdiocese of Vilnius (Bystra Sidzina, Poland – Grodno, Belarus)
  - Jan Turchan (Narcyz) (1879–1942), Professed Priest of the Franciscan Friars Minor (Wieliczce, Poland – Oberbayern, Germany)
  - Dominik Jędrzejewski (1886–1942), Priest of the Diocese of Włocławek (Włocławek, Poland – Oberbayern, Germany)
  - Piotr Edward Dańkowski (1908–1942), Priest of the Archdiocese of Kraków (Sucha Beskidzka – Oświęcim, Poland)
  - Piotr Żukowski (Bonifacy) (1913–1942), Professed Religious of the Franciscan Conventuals (Vilnius, Lithuania – Oberbayern, Germany)
  - Feliks Ducki (Symforian) (1888–1942), Professed Religious of the Franciscan Capuchins (Warsaw – Oświęcim, Poland)
  - Józef Czempiel (1883–1942), Priest of the Archdiocese of Katowice (Piekary Śląskie, Poland – Oberbayern, Germany)
  - Kazimierz Gostyński (1884–1942), Priest of the Archdiocese of Lublin (Warsaw, Poland – Oberbayern, Germany)
  - Henryk Kaczorowski (1888–1942), Priest of the Diocese of Włocławek (Kłodawa, Poland – Oberbayern, Germany)
  - Stanisław Kubski (1876–1942), Priest of the Archdiocese of Gniezno (Strzelno, Poland – Oberbayern, Germany)
  - Jakub Pankiewicz (Anastazy) (1882–1942), Professed Priest of the Franciscan Friars Minor; Founder of the Antonian Sisters of Christ the King (Bukowsko, Poland – Oberbayern, Germany)
  - Michał Woźniak (1875–1942), Priest of the Archdiocese of Warsaw (Pruszków, Poland – Oberbayern, Germany)
  - Jan Oprządek (Marcin) (1884–1942), Professed Religious of the Franciscan Friars Minor (Chrzanów, Poland – Oberbayern, Germany)
  - Antoni Zawistowski (1882–1942), Priest of the Archdiocese of Lublin (Czyżew, Poland – Oberbayern, Germany)
  - Maksymilian Binkiewicz (1908–1942), Priest of the Archdiocese of Częstochowa (Zawiercie, Poland – Oberbayern, Germany)
  - Jan Nepomucen Chrzan (1885–1942), Priest of the Archdiocese of Gniezno (Nowe Skalmierzyce, Poland – Oberbayern, Germany)
  - Józef Kowalski (1911–1942), Professed Priest of the Salesians of Don Bosco (Lubenia – Oświęcim, Poland)
  - Hieronim Chojnacki (Fidelis) (1906–1942), Professed Cleric of the Franciscan Capuchins (Łódz, Poland – Oberbayern, Germany)
  - Wojciech Gondek (Krystyn) (1909–1942), Professed Priest of the Franciscan Friars Minor (Zakliczyn, Poland – Oberbayern, Germany)
  - Michał Oziębłowski (1900–1942), Priest of the Archdiocese of Warsaw (Grodzisk Mazowiecki, Poland – Oberbayern, Germany)
  - Aleksy Sobaszek (1895–1942), Priest of the Archdiocese of Gniezno (Ostrów Wielkopolski, Poland – Oberbayern, Germany)
  - Józef Krzysztofik (Henryk) (1908–1942), Professed Priest of the Franciscan Capuchins (Opoczno, Poland – Oberbayern, Germany)
  - Tadeusz Dulny (1914–1942), Seminarian of the Diocese of Włocławek (Ćmielów, Poland – Oberbayern, Germany)
  - Edward Grzymała (1906–1942), Priest of the Diocese of Włocławek (Węgrów, Poland – Oberbayern, Germany)
  - Franciszek Drzewiecki (1908–1942), Professed Priest of the Sons of Divine Providence (Orionine Fathers) (Łowicz, Poland – Oberbayern, Germany)
  - Józef Straszewski (1885–1942), Priest of the Diocese of Włocławek (Włocławek, Poland – Oberbayern, Germany)
  - Józef Stępniak (Florian) (1912–1942), Professed Priest of the Franciscan Capuchins (Nowe Miasto nad Pilicą, Poland – Oberbayern, Germany)
  - Władysław Mączkowski (1911–1942), Priest of the Archdiocese of Gniezno (Nowe Skalmierzyce, Poland – Oberbayern, Germany)
  - Jan Zembol (Brunon) (1905–1942), Professed Religious of the Franciscan Friars Minor (Sucha, Poland – Oberbayern, Germany)
  - Czesław Jóźwiak (1919–1942), Young Layperson of the Archdiocese of Poznań (Nowa Wieś Wielka, Poland – Dresden, Germany)
  - Edward Kaźmierski (1919–1942), Young Layperson of the Archdiocese of Poznań (Poznań, Poland – Dresden, Germany)
  - Franciszek Kęsy (1920–1942), Young Layperson of the Archdiocese of Poznań (Berlin, Poland – Dresden, Germany)
  - Edward Klinik (1919–1942), Young Layperson of the Archdiocese of Poznań (Arnsberg – Dresden, Germany)
  - Jarogniew Zdzisław Wojciechowski (1922–1942), Young Layperson of the Archdiocese of Poznań (Poznań, Poland – Dresden, Germany)
  - Adam Bargielski (1903–1942), Priest of the Diocese of Łomża (Łomża, Poland – Oberbayern, Germany)
  - Józef Kut (1905–1942), Priest of the Archdiocese of Poznań (Sieroszewice, Poland – Oberbayern, Germany)
  - Antoni Rewera (1869–1942), Priest of the Diocese of Sandomierz; Founder of the Daughters of the Seraphic Saint Francis (Samborzec, Poland – Oberbayern, Germany)
  - Maria Anna Kratochwil (Maria Antonina) (1881–1942), Professed Religious of the School Sisters of Notre Dame (Ostrava, Czech Republic – Ivano–Frankivsk, Ukraine)
  - Edward Detkens (1885–1942), Priest of the Archdiocese of Warsaw (Warsaw, Poland – Oberbayern, Germany)
  - Roman Sitko (1880–1942), Priest of the Diocese of Tarnów (Sędziszów Małopolski – Oświęcim, Poland)
  - Stanisław Mysakowski (1896–1942), Priest of the Archdiocese of Lublin (Chełm, Poland – Oberbayern, Germany)
  - Franciszek Rosłaniec (1889–1942), Priest of the Diocese of Radom (Białobrzegi, Poland – Oberbayern, Germany)
  - Władysław Miegoń (1892–1942), Priest of the Military Ordinariate of Poland (Sandomierz, Poland – Oberbayern, Germany)
  - Bronisław Kostkowski (1915–1942), Seminarian of the Diocese of Włocławek (Słupsk, Poland – Oberbayern, Germany)
  - Narcyz Putz (1877–1942), Priest of the Archdiocese of Poznań (Międzychód, Poland – Oberbayern, Germany)
  - Alojzy Liguda (1898–1942), Professed Priest of the Society of the Divine Word (Opole, Poland – Oberbayern, Germany)
  - Kazimierz Tomasz Sykulski (1882–1942), Priest of the Diocese of Radom (Końskie – Oświęcim, Poland)
  - Kazimiera Wołowska (Maria Marta of Jesus) (1879–1942), Professed Religious of the Sisters of the Immaculate Conception of the Blessed Virgin (Lublin, Poland – Minsk, Belarus)
  - Bogumiła Noiszewska (Maria Ewa of Providence) (1885–1942), Professed Religious of the Sisters of the Immaculate Conception of the Blessed Virgin (Vilnius, Lithuania – Minsk, Belarus)
  - Marian Konopiński (1907–1943), Priest of the Archdiocese of Poznań (Ostroróg, Poland – Oberbayern, Germany)
  - Zygmunt Pisarski (1902–1943), Priest of the Archdiocese of Lublin (Krasnystaw, Poland – Oberbayern, Germany)
  - Antoni Leszczewicz (1890–1943), Professed Priest of the Marians of the Immaculate Conception (Minsk, Belarus – Vitebsk, Belarus)
  - Jerzy Kaszyra (1904–1943), Professed Priest of the Marians of the Immaculate Conception (Vitebsk, Belarus)
  - Roman Archutowski (1882–1943), Priest of the Archdiocese of Warsaw (Legionowo – Lublin, Poland)
  - Bolesław Frąckowiak (Grzegorz) (1911–1943), Professed Religious of the Society of the Divine Word (Jaraczewo, Poland – Dresden, Germany)
  - Marianna Czokało Biernacka (1888–1943), Married Layperson of the Diocese of Łomża (Augustów, Poland – Grodno, Belarus)
  - Antoni Beszta-Borowski (1880–1943), Priest of the Diocese of Drohiczyn nad Bugiem (Turośń Kościelna – Bielsk Podlaski, Poland)
  - Józef Puchała (Achilles) (1911–1943), Professed Priest of the Franciscan Conventuals (Łańcut, Poland – Minsk, Belarus)
  - Karol Stępień (Herman) (1910–1943), Professed Priest of the Franciscan Conventuals (Łódź, Poland – Minsk, Belarus)
  - Maria Klemensa Staszewska (1890–1943), Professed Religious of the Ursulines of the Roman Union (Sieradz – Oświęcim, Poland)
  - Katarzyna Faron (Celestyna) (1913–1944), Professed Religious of the Little Servant Sisters of the Immaculate Conception (Nowy Sącz – Oświęcim, Poland)
  - Franciszek Stryjas (1882–1944), married laywoman of the Diocese of Kalisz (Kalisz, Poland)
  - Józef Mazurek (Alfons Maria of the Holy Spirit) (1891–1944), Professed Priest of the Discalced Carmelites (Lubartów – Krzeszowice, Poland)
  - Franciszek Dachtera (1910–1944), Priest of the Archdiocese of Gniezno (Bydgoszcz, Poland – Oberbayern, Germany)
  - Jan Franciszek Czartoryski (Michał) (1897–1944), Professed Priest of the Dominicans (Jarosław – Warsaw, Poland)
  - Władysław Błądziński (1908–1944), Professed Priest of the Congregation of Saint Michael the Archangel (Lviv, Ukraine – Strzegom, Poland)
  - Józef Stanek (1916–1944), Consecrated Priest of the Pallotines (Nowy Targ – Warsaw, Poland)
  - Antoni Świadek (1909–1945), Priest of the Archdiocese of Gniezno (Poznań, Poland – Oberbayern, Germany)
  - Józef Zapłata (1904–1945), Professed Religious of the Brothers of the Sacred Heart of Jesus (Kościan, Poland – Oberbayern, Germany)
  - Stanisława Maria Józefa Rodzińska (Maria Julia) (1899–1945), Professed Religious of the Sisters of Saint Dominic (Dominican Sisters of Poland) (Nowy Sącz – Nowy Dwór Gdański, Poland)
  - Paweł Januszewski (Hilary) (1909–1945), Professed Priest of the Carmelites of the Ancient Observance (Tuchola, Poland – Oberbayern, Germany)
  - Natalia Tułasiewicz (1906–1945), Layperson of the Archdiocese of Poznań (Rzeszów, Poland – Oberhavel, Germany)
  - Władysław Goral (1898–1945), Titular Bishop of Meloë in Isauria; Auxiliary Bishop of Lublin (Lubelskie, Poland – Oranienburg, Germany)
    - Declared "Venerable": 26 March 1999
    - Beatified: 13 June 1999 by Pope John Paul II
- Martyrs of Pratulin (Rokitno, Poland):
  - Wincenty Lewoniuk (1849–1874), Married Layperson of the Diocese of Siedlce (Janów Podlaski, Poland)
  - Daniel Karmasz (1826–1874), Married Layperson of the Diocese of Siedlce (Terespol, Poland)
  - Łukasz Bojko (1852–1874), Young Layperson of the Diocese of Siedlce (Rokitno, Poland)
  - Bartłomiej Osypiuk (1843–1874), Married Layperson of the Diocese of Siedlce (Terespol, Poland)
  - Onufry Wasyluk (1853–1874), Young Married Layperson of the Diocese of Siedlce (Rokitno, Poland)
  - Filip Geryluk [Kiryluk] (1830–1874), Married Layperson of the Diocese of Siedlce (Rokitno, Poland)
  - Konstanty Bojko (1826–1874), Married Layperson of the Diocese of Siedlce (Rokitno, Poland)
  - Anicet Hryciuk [Gryciuk] (1855–1874), Layperson of the Diocese of Siedlce (Rokitno, Poland)
  - Ignacy Frańczuk (1824–1874), Young Married Layperson of the Diocese of Siedlce (Rokitno, Poland)
  - Jan Andrezejuk (1848–1874), Married Layperson of the Diocese of Siedlce (Rokitno, Poland)
  - Konstanty Łukaszuk (1829–1874), Married Layperson of the Diocese of Siedlce (Rokitno, Poland)
  - Maksym Hawryluk (1840–1874), Married Layperson of the Diocese of Siedlce (Terespol, Poland)
  - Michał Wawryszuk [Wawrzyszuk] (1853–1874), Married Layperson of the Diocese of Siedlce (Rokitno, Poland)
    - Declared "Venerable": 25 June 1996
    - Beatified: 6 October 1996 by Pope John Paul II
- 81 Polish Martyrs under the Nazis:
  - Ignacy Trenda (1882–1939), Married Layperson of the Diocese of Kielce (Częstochowa, Poland)
  - Piotr Szarek (1908–1939), Priest of the Congregation of the Mission (Vincentians) (Jędrzejów – Bydgoszcz, Poland)
  - Stanisław Wiórek (1912–1939), Priest of the Congregation of the Mission (Vincentians) (Bottrop, Germany – Bydgoszcz, Poland)
  - Emilia Główczyńska (Maria Hilaria of the Name of Jesus) (1888–1939), Professed Religious of the Little Sisters of the Immaculate Heart of Mary – Sisters of the Blessed Sacrament (Hrubieszów – Warsaw, Poland)
  - Henryk Antoni Szuman (1882–1939), Priest of the Diocese of Pelplin (Toruń – Bydgoszcz, Poland)
  - Jan Hamerski (1880–1939), Priest of the Diocese of Pelplin (Nakło nad Notecią – Starogard Gdański, Poland)
  - Józef Roskwitalski (1893–1939), Priest of the Diocese of Pelplin (Starogard Gdański – Tczew, Poland)
  - Franciszek Nogalski (1911–1939), Priest of the Diocese of Pelplin (Wąbrzeźno – Tuchola, Poland)
  - Piotr Sosnowski (1899–1939), Priest of the Diocese of Pelplin (Toruń – Tuchola, Poland)
  - Antoni Arasmus (1894–1939), Priest of the Diocese of Pelplin (Starogard Gdański – Kartuzy, Poland)
  - Hieronim Gintrowski (1878–1939), Priest of the Congregation of the Mission (Vincentians) (Kościan – Bydgoszcz, Poland)
  - Józef Mańkowski (1904–1939), Priest of the Diocese of Pelplin (Świecie – Chohnice, Poland)
  - Anastazy Kręcki: (1888–1939), Priest of the Diocese of Pelplin (Chojnice – Puck, Poland)
  - Edmund Roszczynialski (1888–1939), Priest of the Diocese of Pelpin (Wejherowo – Lębork, Poland)
  - Jan Lesiński (1908–1940), Priest of the Diocese of Pelpin (Grudziądz – Nowy Dwór Gdański, Poland)
  - Teodor Sąsała (1888–1940), Professed Priest of the Society of the Divine Word (Opole, Poland – Oranienburg, Germany)
  - Bernard Antoni Łosiński (1865–1940), Priest of the Diocese of Pelpin (Kościerzyna, Poland – Oranienburg, Germany)
  - Roman Kozubek (1908–1940), Professed Priest of the Society of the Divine Word (Gliwice, Poland – Oranienburg, Germany)
  - Cyryl Karczyński (1884–1940), Priest of the Diocese of Pelpin (Tczew, Poland – Oranienburg, Germany)
  - Ferdynand Machay (1914–1940), Priest of the Oratorians (Tarnow Congregation) (Nowy Targ – Bochnia, Poland)
  - Konstantyn Krefft (1867–1940), Priest of the Diocese of Pelplin (Chojnice – Nowy Dwór Gdański, Poland)
  - Józef Słupina (1880–1940), Priest of the Congregation of the Mission (Vincentians) (Chorzów – Oświęcim, Poland)
  - Jan Włoch (1914–1940), Professed Cleric of the Society of the Divine Word (Starogard Gdański, Poland – Perg, Austria)
  - Stefan Radtke (1890–1940), Priest of the Diocese of Pelplin (Puck, Poland – Oranienburg, Germany)
  - Florian Białka (1918–1940), Professed Cleric of the Society of the Divine Word (Starogard Gdański, Poland – Perg, Austria)
  - Kazimierz Kuriański (1917–1940), Professed Cleric of the Society of the Divine Word (Lviv, Ukraine – Perg, Austria)
  - Norbert Kompalla (1907–1940), Priest of the Congregation of the Mission (Vincentians) (Ruda Śląska – Oświęcim, Poland)
  - Bronisław Kowalski (1917–1940), Professed Cleric of the Society of the Divine Word (Działdowo, Poland – Perg, Austria)
  - Stanisław Robert Kołka (1920–1940), Professed Cleric of the Society of the Divine Word (Gdańsk, Poland – Perg, Austria)
  - Jan Wojtkowiak (1917–1940), Professed Priest of the Society of the Divine Word (Borek Wielkopolski, Poland – Perg, Austria)
  - Józef Zwoliński (Serafin) (1879–1940), Professed Religious of the Albertines (Kraków, Poland – Oberbayern, Germany)
  - Norbert Gosieniecki (1920–1940), Professed Cleric of the Society of the Divine Word (Grudziądz, Poland – Perg, Austria)
  - Józef Huwer (1895–1941) Professed Priest of the Society of the Divine Word (Wodzisław Śląski, Poland – Weimar, Germany)
  - Jan Stoltmann (1920–1941), Professed Cleric of the Society of the Divine Word (Chojnice, Poland – Oberbayern, Germany)
  - Michał Jachimczak (1908–1941), Priest of the Congregation of the Mission (Vincentians) (Wieliczka, Poland – Oberbayern, Germany)
  - Jan Garczyński (1914–1941), Professed Cleric of the Society of the Divine Word (Mogilno, Poland – Oberbayern, Germany)
  - Leon Łukasz Hirsch (1917–1941), Professed Cleric of the Society of the Divine Word (Gdynia, Poland – Oberbayern, Germany)
  - Jerzy Jakowejczuk (1916–1941), Professed Cleric of the Society of the Divine Word (Kraków, Poland – Perg, Austria)
  - Franciszka Grzanka (Romualda) (1901–1941), Professed Religious of the Little Servant Sisters of the Immaculate Conception (Mielec – Rawicz, Poland)
  - Jan Świerc (1877–1941), Professed Priest of the Salesians of Don Bosco (Chorzów – Oświęcim, Poland)
  - Ignacy Dobiasz (1880–1941), Professed Priest of the Salesians of Don Bosco (Gliwice – Oświęcim, Poland)
  - Franciszek Harazim (1885–1941), Professed Priest of the Salesians of Don Bosco (Żory – Oświęcim, Poland)
  - Kazimierz Wojciechowski (1904–1941), Professed Priest of the Salesians of Don Bosco (Jasło – Oświęcim, Poland)
  - Jan Szambelańczyk (1907–1941), Consecrated Priest of the Pallotines (Września – Oświęcim, Poland)
  - Czesław Golak (1919–1941), Professed Cleric of the Society of the Divine Word (Poznań, Poland – Perg, Austria)
  - Ignacy Antonowicz (1890–1941), Professed Priest of the Salesians of Don Bosco (Włocławek – Oświęcim, Poland)
  - Ludwik Mroczek (1905–1942), Professed Priest of the Salesians of Don Bosco (Oświęcim – Oświęcim, Poland)
  - Franciszek Kilian (1895–1942), Consecrated Priest of the Pallotines (Starogard – Oświęcim, Poland)
  - Norbert Jan Pellowski (1903–1942), Consecrated Priest of the Pallotines (Gdańsk – Oświęcim, Poland)
  - Dominik Kaczyński (1886–1942), Priest of the Diocese of Dominik Kaczyński (Wieruszów, Poland – Oberbayern, Germany)
  - Franciszek Bryja (1910–1942), Consecrated Priest of the Pallotines (Żywiec, Poland – Oberbayern, Germany)
  - Jan Jędrychowski (1899–1942), Priest of the Congregation of the Mission (Vincentians) (Kraków, Poland – Eferding, Austria)
  - Józef Huchracki (Euzebiusz) (1885–1942), Professed Priest of the Franciscan Friars Minor (Katowice, Poland – Eferding, Austria)
  - Karol Golda (1914–1942), Professed Priest of the Salesians of Don Bosco (Górny Śląsk – Oświęcim, Poland)
  - Franciszek Miśka (1898–1942), Professed Priest of the Salesians of Don Bosco (Bieruń, Poland – Oberbayern, Germany)
  - Józef Wolniarski (Wincenty) (1874–1942), Professed Religious of the Albertines (Kazimerza Wielka, Poland – Eferding, Austria)
  - Marcin Tomaka (1884–1942), Priest of the Diocese of Przemyśl (Rzeszów, Poland – Oberbayern, Germany)
  - Maciej Poprawa (Alojzy) (1893–1942), Professed Priest of the Camaldolese (Kraków, Poland – Oberbayern, Germany)
  - Paweł Prabucki (1894–1941), Priest of the Diocese of Pelplin (Starogard, Poland – Oberbayern, Germany)
  - Teodor Drapiewski (1880–1942), Professed Priest of the Society of the Divine Word (Świecie, Poland – Oberbayern, Germany)
  - Włodzimierz Szembek (1883–1942), Professed Priest of the Salesians of Don Bosco (Chrzanów – Oświęcim, Poland)
  - Walenty Kozik (Cherubin) (1906–1942), Professed Priest of the Camaldolese (Kraków, Poland – Eferding, Austria)
  - Jan Siuzdak (1898–1942), Priest of the Diocese of Przemyśl (Leżajsk, Poland – Oberbayern, Germany)
  - Antoni Tworek (1897–1942), Priest of the Diocese of Sandomierz (Sandomierz, Poland – Oberbayern, Germany)
  - Władysław Osmański (1917–1942), Professed Cleric of the Society of the Divine Word (Nowe Miasto Lubawskie, Poland – Oberbayern, Germany)
  - Piotr Gołąb (1888–1943), Professed Priest of the Society of the Divine Word (Opole, Poland – Oberbayern, Germany)
  - Edmund Kałas (1899–1943), Professed Priest of the Missionaries of the Holy Family (Koronowo, Poland – Perg, Austria)
  - Stanisław Witt (1919–1943), Professed Cleric of the Society of the Divine Word (Starogard, Poland – Oberbayern, Germany)
  - Joanna Józefa Lula (Hiacynta) (1915–1943), Professed Religious of the Little Servant Sisters of the Immaculate Conception (Jasło – Oświęcim, Poland)
  - Błażej Nowosad (1903–1943), Priest of the Diocese of Zamość-Lubasczów (Tomaszów Lubelskie – Biłgoraj, Poland)
  - Jan Chryzostom Michałkowski (1914–1943), Priest of the Oratorians (Studzianna Congregation) (Kościan, Poland – Nordhasen, Germany)
  - Julia Buniowska (1922–1944), Young Layperson of the Diocese of Przemyśl (Przeworsk, Poland)
  - Tadeusz Burzyński (1914–1944), Priest of the Diocese of Łódź (Łowicz – Warsaw, Poland)
  - Leon Więckiewicz (1914–1944), Priest of the Congregation of the Mission (Vincentians) (Saint Petersburg, Russia – Strzegom, Poland)
  - Jerzy Powiertowski (Franciszek of Saint Joseph) (1917–1944), Professed Cleric of the Discalced Carmelites (Warsaw – Kraków, Poland)
  - Adam Małuszyński (1916–1945), Priest of the Congregation of the Mission (Vincentians) (Lviv, Ukraine – Nordhasen, Germany)
  - Bernard Jaruszewski (1916–1945), Seminarian of the Diocese of Pelplin (Toruń, Poland – Perg, Austria)
  - Józef Florko (1915–1945), Priest of the Congregation of the Mission (Vincentians) (Lviv, Ukraine – Celle, Germany)
  - Paweł Krawcewicz (1907–1945), Professed Religious of the Pallotines (Arnsberg – Gotha, Germany)
- Jesuit Martyrs of Poland:
  - Józef Cyrek (1904–1940), Professed priest of the Jesuits (Myślenice – Oświęcim, Poland)
  - Marian Józef Wojciech Morawski (1881–1940), Professed Priest of the Jesuits (Budapest, Hungary – Oświęcim, Poland)
  - Franciszek Mateusz Kałuża (1877–1941), Professed Priest of the Jesuits (Cieszyn, Poland – Oberbayern, Germany)
  - Bronisław Wielgorz (1916–1942), Professed Cleric of the Jesuits (Jasło, Poland – Oberbayern, Germany)
  - Stanisław Komar (1882–1942), Professed Religious of the Jesuits (Stockholm, Sweden – Oberbayern, Germany)
  - Stanisław Józef Bednarski (1896–1942), Professed Priest of the Jesuits (Sącz, Poland – Oberbayern, Germany)
  - Kazimierz Marian Antoni Dembowski (1912–1942), Professed Priest of the Jesuits (Strzyżów, Poland – Oberbayern, Germany)
  - Michał Malinowski (1887–1942), Professed Priest of the Jesuits (Myadzel, Belarus – Oberbayern, Germany)
  - Adam Sztark (1907–1942), Professed Priest of the Jesuits (Kalisz, Poland – Minsk, Belarus)
  - Stanisław Sewiłło (1917–1943), Professed Cleric of the Jesuits (Sokołów, Poland – Oberbayern, Germany)
  - Edmund Roszak (1900–1943), Professed Priest of the Jesuits (Poznań, Poland – Svislach, Belarus)
  - Władysława Wiącka (1910–1944), Professed Priest of the Jesuits (Świdnik – Warsaw, Poland)
  - Stanisław Tadeusz Podoleński (1887–1945), Professed Priest of the Jesuits (Una-Sana, Bosnia and Herzegovina – Oberbayern, Germany)
  - Jan Zając (1911–1945), Professed Religious of the Jesuits (Przeworsk, Poland – Oberbayern, Germany)
  - Jerzy Stanisław Musiał (1919–1945), Professed Cleric of the Jesuits (Warsaw, Poland – Oberbayern, Germany)
- Martyrs of Warmia Archdiocese (Nazism):
  - Paweł Katscherowski (1891–1939), Priest of the Archdiocese of Warmia (Wejherowo – Olsztyn, Poland)
  - Bronisław Sochaczewski (1886–1940), Priest of the Archdiocese of Warmia (Chojnice, Poland – Oberhavel, Germany)
  - Ernest Karbaum (1917–1940), Priest of the Archdiocese of Warmia (Orneta – Nowy Dwór Gdański, Poland)
  - Leon Olszewski (1894–1942), Priest of the Archdiocese of Warmia (Kaliningrad, Russia – Oberbayern, Germany)
  - Stanisław Witold Zuske (1903–1942), Priest of the Archdiocese of Warmia (Kórnik – Nowy Dwór Gdański, Poland)
  - Alfons Zurawski (1914–1942), Layperson of the Archdiocese of Warmia (Jonkowo, Poland – Brandenburg, Germany)
  - Wojciech Teofil Rogazcewski (1888–1944), Priest of the Archdiocese of Warmia (Dąbrowa, Poland – Weimar, Germany)
  - Ryszard Knosała (1907–1945), Married Layperson of the Archdiocese of Warmia (Dąbrowa, Poland – Oberbayern, Germany)
- Dominican Martyrs of Chortkiv (Ternopil, Ukraine):
  - Jan Spyrłak (Justyn) (1895–1941), Professed Priest of the Dominicans (Kraków, Poland)
  - Franciszek Longawa (Hieronim) (1872–1941), Professed Priest of the Dominicans (Miejsce Piastowe, Poland)
  - Stanisław Misiuta (Jacek) (1909–1941), Professed Priest of the Dominicans (Telatyn, Poland)
  - Adam Znamirowski (Anatol) (1910–1941), Professed Priest of the Dominicans (Przemyśl, Poland)
  - Stanisław Bojakowski (Andrzej) (1897–1941), Professed Religious of the Dominicans (Lviv, Ukraine)
  - Martin Czerwonka (Reginald) (1857–1941), Professed Religious of the Dominicans (Krosno, Poland)
  - Karol Iwaniszczów (Metody) (1910–1941), Professed Religious of the Dominicans (Lviv, Ukraine)
  - Józef Wincentowicz (1870–1941), Layperson of the Archdiocese of Lviv of the Latins; Member of the Lay Dominicans (Kraków, Poland)
- Augustinian Martyrs of Kraków:
  - Bolesław Jan Gaczek (Wilhelm) (1881–1941), Professed Priest of the Augustinians (Sucha – Oświęcim, Poland)
  - Tadeusz Wilucki (Edmund) (1913–1941), Professed Priest of the Augustinians (Ruhr – Oświęcim, Poland)
  - Kazimierz Lipka (Wojciech) (1891–1942), Professed Religious of the Augustinians (Sucha – Oświęcim, Poland)
  - Adam Olszewski (Krzysztof) (1907–1942), Professed Priest of the Augustinians (Drzewce – Oberbayern, Germany)
- Martyrs of Bielsko-Żywiec Diocese (Bielsko-Biała, Poland):
  - Ferdynand Sznajdrowicz (1886–1940), Priest of the Diocese of Bielsko-Żywiec (Żywiec – Katowice, Poland)
  - Józef Kwiczala (1889–1940), Priest of the Diocese of Bielsko-Żywiec (Chorzów, Poland – Kraków, Poland)
  - Leon Haroński (1899–1940), Priest of the Diocese of Bielsko-Żywiec (Zebrzydowice – Weimar, Germany)
  - Ludwik Wrzoł (1881–1940), Priest of the Diocese of Bielsko-Żywiec (Bielsko, Poland – Perg, Austria)
  - Jan Sznurowacki (1883–1941), Priest of the Diocese of Bielsko-Żywiec (Frýdek-Místek, Czech Republic – Oberbayern, Germany)
  - Stanisław Kukla (1881–1941), Priest of the Diocese of Bielsko-Żywiec (Pszczyna, Poland – Oberbayern, Germany)
  - Edward Rduch (1885–1941), Priest of the Diocese of Bielsko-Żywiec (Aleksandrów Łódzki, Poland – Perg, Austria)
  - Jan Nepomucen Barabasz (1873–1941), Priest of the Diocese of Bielsko-Żywiec (Ustroń, Poland – Oberbayern, Germany)
  - Rudolf Tomaek (1879–1941), Priest of the Diocese of Bielsko-Żywiec (Frýdek-Místek, Czech Republic – Oberbayern, Germany)
  - Józef Kula (1891–1941), Priest of the Diocese of Bielsko-Żywiec (Cieszyn, Poland – Oberbayern, Germany)
  - Erwin Duda (1911–1941), Priest of the Diocese of Bielsko-Żywiec (Cieszyn, Poland – Oberbayern, Germany)
  - Rudolf Szostok (1904–1942), Priest of the Diocese of Bielsko-Żywiec (Kraków – Cieszyn, Poland)
  - Wojciech Kufel (1916–1942), Seminarian of the Diocese of Bielsko-Żywiec (Żywiec – Oświęcim, Poland)
  - Zygmunt Krzyżanowski (1905–1942), Priest of the Diocese of Bielsko-Żywiec (Zboriv, Ukraine – Oświęcim, Poland)
  - Franciszek Bojdoł (1905–1942), Priest of the Diocese of Bielsko-Żywiec (Mikołów – Oświęcim, Poland)
  - Władysław Suchoń (1885–1942), Priest of the Diocese of Bielsko-Żywiec (Oświęcim, Poland – Oberbayern, Germany)
  - Alfons Latocha (1906–1942), Priest of the Diocese of Bielsko-Żywiec (Ustroń, Poland – Oberbayern, Germany)
  - Józef Kopijasz (1871–1942), Priest of the Diocese of Bielsko-Żywiec (Oświęcim, Poland)
  - Zdzisław Belon (1906–1942), Priest of the Diocese of Bielsko-Żywiec (Jarosław, Poland – Oberbayern, Germany)
  - Karol Kałuża (1899–1943), Priest of the Diocese of Bielsko-Żywiec (Katowice, Poland – Oberbayern, Germany)
  - Józef Balcarek (1912–1946), Priest of the Diocese of Bielsko-Żywiec (Karviná, Czech Republic – Ustroń, Poland)
- Blessed Martyrs of Nowogródek (Grodno, Belarus)
  - Adela Mardosewicz (Maria Stella of the Most Blessed Sacrament) (1888–1943), Professed Religious of the Sisters of the Holy Family of Nazareth (Minsk, Belarus)
  - Jadwiga Karolina Żak (Maria Imelda of the Eucharistic Jesus) (1892–1943), Professed Religious of the Sisters of the Holy Family of Nazareth (Oświęcim, Poland)
  - Anna Kokołowicz (Maria Rajmunda of Jesus and Mary) (1892–1943), Professed Religious of the Sisters of the Holy Family of Nazareth (Vilnius, Lithuania)
  - Eleonora Aniela Jóźwik (Marie Daniela of Jesus and Mary Immaculate) (1895–1943), Professed Religious of the Sisters of the Holy Family of Nazareth (Lubartów, Poland)
  - Józefa Chrobot (Maria Kanuta of Jesus in the Garden) (1896–1943), Professed Religious of the Sisters of the Holy Family of Nazareth (Wieluń, Poland)
  - Julia Rapiej (Maria Sergia of the Sorrowful Mother of God) (1900–1943), Professed Religious of the Sisters of the Holy Family of Nazareth (Augustów, Poland)
  - Helena Cierpka (Maria Gwidona of the Mercy of God) (1900–1943), Professed Religious of the Sisters of the Holy Family of Nazareth (Ostrów Wielkopolski, Poland)
  - Paulina Borowik (Maria Felicyta) (1905–1943), Professed Religious of the Sisters of the Holy Family of Nazareth (Parczew, Poland)
  - Leokadia Matuszewska (Maria Heliodora) (1906–1943), Professed Religious of the Sisters of the Holy Family of Nazareth (Świecie, Poland)
  - Eugenia Mackiewicz (Maria Kanizja) (1900–1943), Professed Religious of the Sisters of the Holy Family of Nazareth (Suwałki, Poland)
  - Weronika Narmontowicz (Maria Boromea) (1916–1943), Professed Religious of the Sisters of the Holy Family of Nazareth (Grodno, Belarus)
    - Declared "Venerable": 28 June 1999
    - Beatified: 5 March 2000 by Pope John Paul II
- Ulma Family: Martyrs of Markowa (Łańcut, Poland):
  - Józef Ulma (1900–1944), Married Layperson of the Diocese of Przemyśl of the Latins (Łańcut, Poland)
  - Wiktoria Niemczak Ulma (1912–1944), Married Layperson of the Diocese of Przemyśl of the Latins (Łańcut, Poland)
  - Stanisława [Stasia] Ulma (1936–1944), Child of the Diocese of Przemyśl of the Latins (Łańcut, Poland)
  - Barbara Jadwiga [Basia] Ulma (1937–1944), Child of the Diocese of Przemyśl of the Latins (Łańcut, Poland)
  - Władysław [Władziu] Ulma (1938–1944), Child of the Diocese of Przemyśl of the Latins (Łańcut, Poland)
  - Franciszek [Franuś] Ulma (1940–1944), Child of the Diocese of Przemyśl of the Latins (Łańcut, Poland)
  - Antoni [Antoś] Ulma (1941–1944), Child of the Diocese of Przemyśl of the Latins (Łańcut, Poland)
  - Maria [Marysia] Ulma (1942–1944), Child of the Diocese of Przemyśl of the Latins (Łańcut, Poland)
  - Unnamed male baby Ulma († 1944), Child of the Diocese of Przemyśl of the Latins (Łańcut, Poland)
    - Declared "Venerable": 17 December 2022
    - Beatified: 10 September 2023 by Cardinal Marcello Semeraro
- Blessed Martyrs of the Sisters of Saint Elizabeth
  - Juliana Kubitzki (Maria Edelburgis) (1905–1945), Professed Religious of the Sisters of Saint Elizabeth (Namysłów – Żary, Poland)
  - Elfrieda Schilling (Maria Rosaria) (1908–1945), Professed Religious of the Sisters of Saint Elizabeth (Wrocław – Bolesławiec, Poland)
  - Klara Schramm (Maria Adela) (1885–1945), Professed Religious of the Sisters of Saint Elizabeth (Kłodzko – Bolesławiec, Poland)
  - Anna Thienel (Maria Sabina) (1909–1945), Professed Religious of the Sisters of Saint Elizabeth (Opole – Lubań, Poland)
  - Łuczja Heymann (Maria Sapientia) (1875–1945), Professed Religious of the Sisters of Saint Elizabeth (Wałcz – Nysa, Poland)
  - Marta Rybka (Maria Melusja) (1905–1945), Professed Religious of the Sisters of Saint Elizabeth (Brzeg – Nysa, Poland)
  - Jadwiga Töpfer (Maria Adelheidis) (1887–1945), Professed Religious of the Sisters of Saint Elizabeth (Nysa, Poland)
  - Anna Ellmerer (Maria Felicitas) (1889–1945), Professed Religious of the Sisters of Saint Elizabeth (Ebersberg, Germany – Nysa, Poland)
  - Helena Goldberg (Maria Acutina) (1882–1945), Professed Religious of the Sisters of Saint Elizabeth (Nowy Targ – Wołów, Poland)
  - Magdalena Jahn (Maria Paschalis) (1898–1945), Professed Religious of the Sisters of Saint Elizabeth (Nysa – Šumperk, Czech Republic)
    - Declared "Venerable": 19 June 2021
    - Beatified: 11 June 2022 by Cardinal Marcello Semeraro
- Blessed Martyrs of the Sisters of Saint Catherine
  - Marta Klomfass (Maria Christophora) (1903–1945), Professed Religious of the Sisters of Saint Catherine, Virgin and Martyr (Biskupiec – Olsztyn, Poland)
  - Maria Domnik (Maria Liberia) (1904–1945), Professed Religious of the Sisters of Saint Catherine, Virgin and Martyr (Kętrzyn – Olsztyn, Poland)
  - Barbara Rautenberg (Maria Secundia) (1887–1945), Professed Religious of the Sisters of Saint Catherine, Virgin and Martyr (Świątki – Kętrzyn, Poland)
  - Agathe Euphemia Bönigk (Maria Adelgard) (1900–1945), Professed Religious of the Sisters of Saint Catherine, Virgin and Martyr (Sztum – Kętrzyn, Poland)
  - Rosalia Angrick (Maria Sabinella) (1880–1945), Professed Religious of the Sisters of Saint Catherine, Virgin and Martyr (Bydgoszcz – Lidzbark Warmiński, Poland)
  - Clara Anna Skibowska (Maria Aniceta) (1882–1945), Professed Religious of the Sisters of Saint Catherine, Virgin and Martyr (Stawiguda – Lidzbark Warmiński, Poland)
  - Maria Schröter (Maria Gebharda) (1886–1945), Professed Religious of the Sisters of Saint Catherine, Virgin and Martyr (Elbląg – Lidzbark Warmiński, Poland)
  - Anna Margenfeld (Maria Mauritia) (1904–1945), Professed Religious of the Sisters of Saint Catherine, Virgin and Martyr (Braniewo, Poland – Tula, Russia)
  - Anna Pestka (Maria Bona) (1905–1945), Professed Religious of the Sisters of Saint Catherine, Virgin and Martyr (Lidzbark, Poland)
  - Maria Bolz (Maria Generosa) (1902–1945), Professed Religious of the Sisters of Saint Catherine, Virgin and Martyr (Olsztyn, Poland)
  - Dorothea Steffen (Maria Gunhild) (1918–1945), Professed Religious of the Sisters of Saint Catherine, Virgin and Martyr (Braniewo – Lidzbark, Poland)
  - Käthe Müller (Maria Leonis) (1913–1945), Professed Religious of the Sisters of Saint Catherine, Virgin and Martyr (Gdańsk, Poland – Siberia, Russia)
  - Hedwig Fahl (Maria Charitina) (1887–1945), Professed Religious of the Sisters of Saint Catherine, Virgin and Martyr (Lidzbark – Gdańsk, Poland)
  - Maria Abraham (Maria Rolanda) (1914–1945), Professed Religious of the Sisters of Saint Catherine, Virgin and Martyr (Elbląg – Lidzbark, Poland)
  - Cäcilia Mischke (Maria Tiburtia) (1888–1945), Professed Religious of the Sisters of Saint Catherine, Virgin and Martyr (Olsztyn, Poland – Moscow, Russia)
  - Maria Rohwedder (Maria Xaveria) (1887–1945), Professed Religious of the Sisters of Saint Catherine, Virgin and Martyr (Braniewo – Olsztyn, Poland)
    - Declared "Venerable": 14 March 2024
    - Beatified: 31 May 2025 by Cardinal Marcello Semeraro
- Martyrs of Warmia Archdiocese (Communism):
  - Paul Chmielewski (1889–1945), Priest of the Archdiocese of Warmia (Gietrzwałd – Purda, Poland)
  - Bernard Klement (1888–1945), Priest of the Archdiocese of Warmia (Purda – Olsztyn, Poland)
  - Otto Langkau (1871–1945), Priest of the Archdiocese of Warmia (Gietrzwałd – Stawiguda, Poland)
  - Cäcilia Grabosch Matern (1915–1945), Married Layperson of the Archdiocese of Warmia (Gietrzwałd – Barczewo, Poland)
  - Bruno Weichsel (1903–1945), Priest of the Archdiocese of Warmia (Pieniężno – Iława, Poland)
  - Hedwig Elisabeth Schnarbach (1923–1945), Young Layperson of the Archdiocese of Warmia (Barczewo, Poland)
  - Angela Hildegard Berger (1926–1945), Young Layperson of the Archdiocese of Warmia (Brzeżno, Poland)
  - Agnieszka [Agnes] Drabińska (1922–1945), Young Layperson of the Archdiocese of Warmia (Barczewo, Poland)
  - Artur Linka (1887–1945), Priest of the Archdiocese of Warmia (Olsztyn, Poland)
  - Joachim Ziemetzki (1886–1945), Priest of the Archdiocese of Warmia (Gietrzwałd – Barczewko, Poland)
  - Jan Lindenblatt (1882–1945), Priest of the Archdiocese of Warmia (Kiwity – Kętrzyn, Poland)
  - Ulryk Schikowski (1907–1945), Priest of the Archdiocese of Warmia (Biskupiec – Płoskinia, Poland)
  - Marianna Witkowska (Maria Teodora) (1889–1945), Professed Religious of the Sisters of Saint Elizabeth (Krotoszyń – Sztum, Poland)
  - Jan Marquardt (1888–1945), Priest of the Archdiocese of Warmia (Wiżajny – Bisztynek, Poland)
  - Gottfried Fuchs (1892–1945), Professed Priest of the Society of the Divine Word (Leverkusen, Germany – Sztum, Poland)
  - Franciszek Ludwig (1896–1945), Priest of the Archdiocese of Warmia (Lidzbark – Bisztynek, Poland)
  - Artur Schulz (1897–1945), Priest of the Archdiocese of Warmia (London, United Kingdom – Bisztynek, Poland)
  - Bruno Siegel (1889–1945), Priest of the Archdiocese of Warmia (Brodnica – Ostróda, Poland)
  - Gertruda Klimek (1922–1945), Young Layperson of the Archdiocese of Warmia (Barczewo, Poland)
  - Wilhelm Brehm (1907–1945), Priest of the Archdiocese of Warmia (Kwidzyn – Kętrzyn, Poland)
  - Wojciech Prothmann (1876–1945), Priest of the Archdiocese of Warmia (Pieniężno – Bisztynek, Poland)
  - Władysław Świtalski (1875–1945), Priest of the Archdiocese of Warmia (Leszno – Frombork, Poland)
  - Paweł Schwartz (1878–1945), Priest of the Archdiocese of Warmia (Lidzbark Warmiński – Kiwity, Poland)
  - Anna Fieberg (1893–1945), Layperson of the Archdiocese of Warmia (Dobre Miasto – Orneta, Poland)
  - Maria Veronica Fischer (1895–1945), Layperson of the Archdiocese of Warmia (Pieniężno – Orneta, Poland)
  - Józef Steinki (1889–1945), Priest of the Archdiocese of Warmia (Głotowo – Olsztyn, Poland)
  - Paweł Huhn (1906–1945), Priest of the Archdiocese of Warmia (Olsztyn – Człuchów, Poland)
  - Franciszek Zagermann (1882–1945), Priest of the Archdiocese of Warmia (Braniewo – Bisztynek, Poland)
  - Margaretha Wiewiorra (1928–1945), Young Layperson of the Archdiocese of Warmia (Biskupiec, Poland)
  - Bruno Bludau (1890–1945), Priest of the Archdiocese of Warmia (Lidzbark, Poland – Perm, Russia)
  - Gerard Witt (1912–1945), Priest of the Archdiocese of Warmia (Reszel – Elbląg, Poland)
  - Karl Langwald (1886–1945), Priest of the Archdiocese of Warmia (Barczewko, Poland – Chelyabinsk, Russia)
  - Georg Heide (1885–1945), Professed Priest of the Society of the Divine Word (Jonkowo – Czajków, Poland)
  - Johannes Frank (1900–1945), Professed Priest of the Society of the Divine Word (Bernkastel-Wittlich, Germany – Donetsk, Ukraine)
  - Bruno Gross (1900–1946), Priest of the Archdiocese of Warmia (Dywity, Poland – Chuvashia, Russia)
  - Ferdynand Podlech (1900–1946), Priest of the Archdiocese of Warmia (Dobre Miasto, Poland – Siberia, Russia)
  - Hubert Gross (1908–1947), Priest of the Archdiocese of Warmia (Malbork, Poland – Kaliningrad, Russia)

== Candidates for sainthood ==
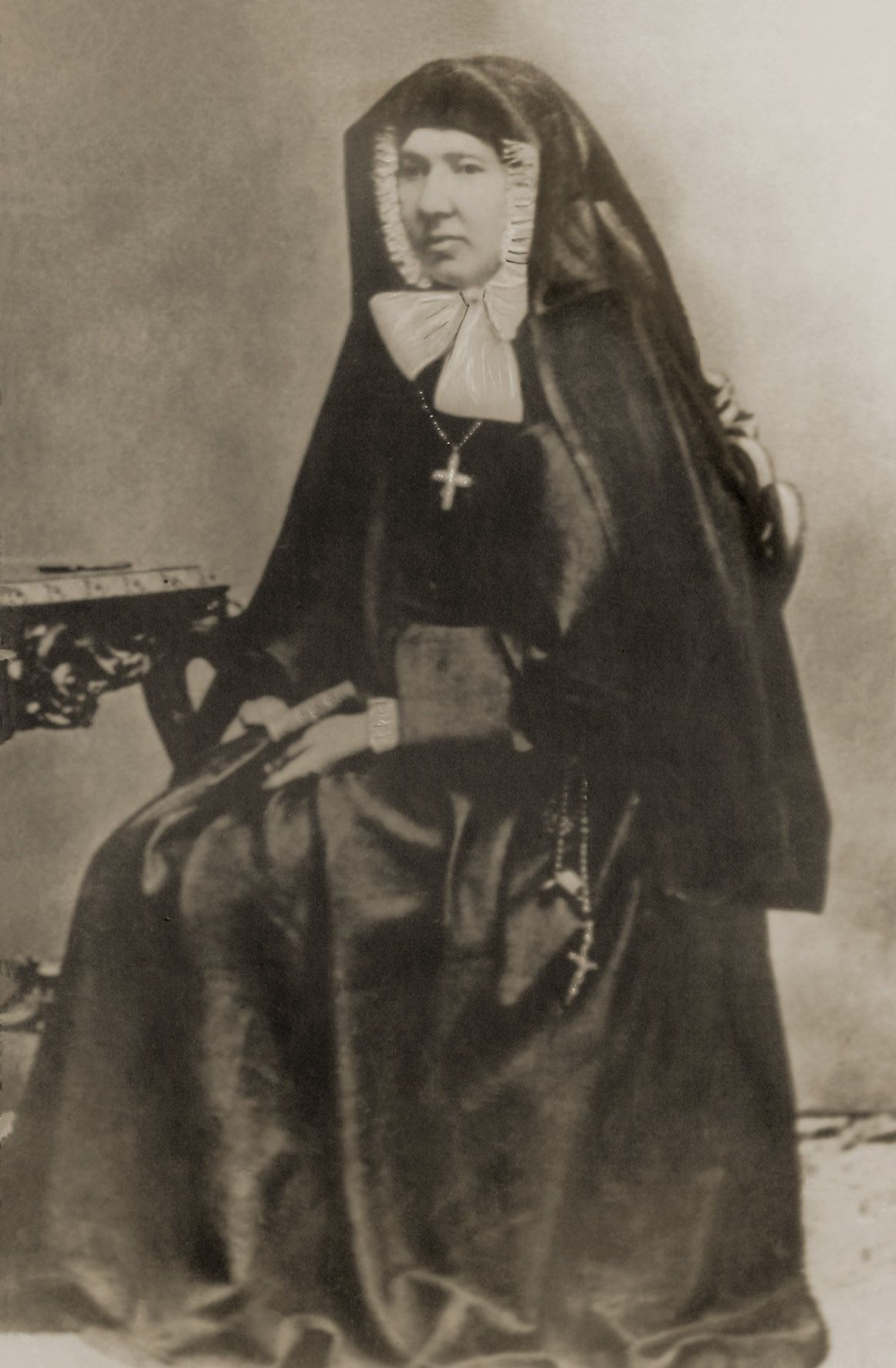
Mother Teresa Potocka, S.O.L.M.

Father Wlodimir Ledóchowski, S.J.

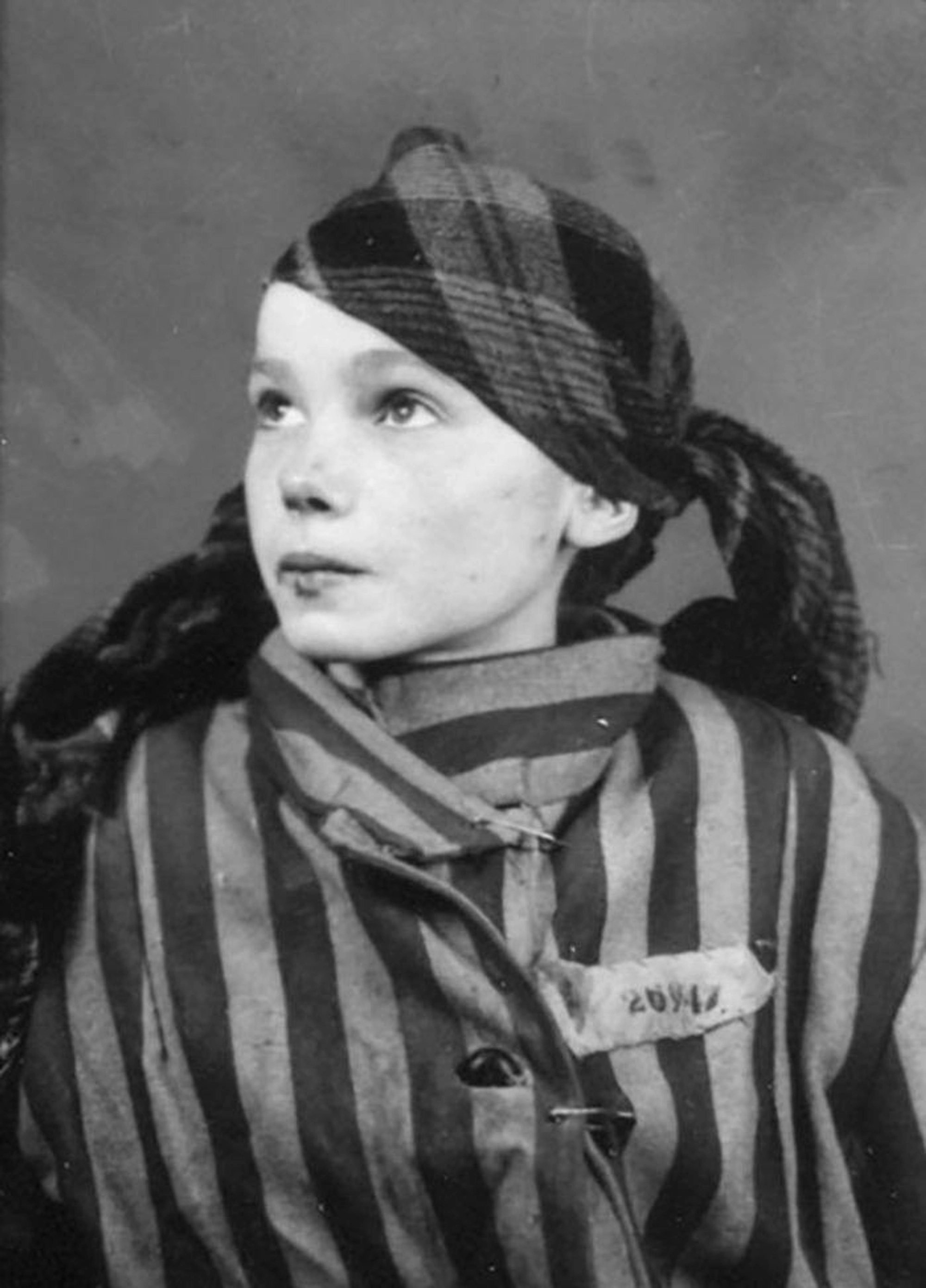
Czesława Kwoka

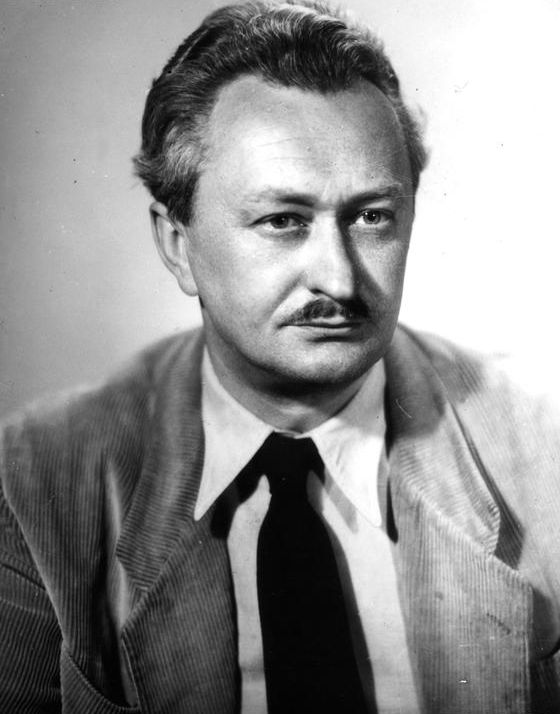
Jan Dobraczyński

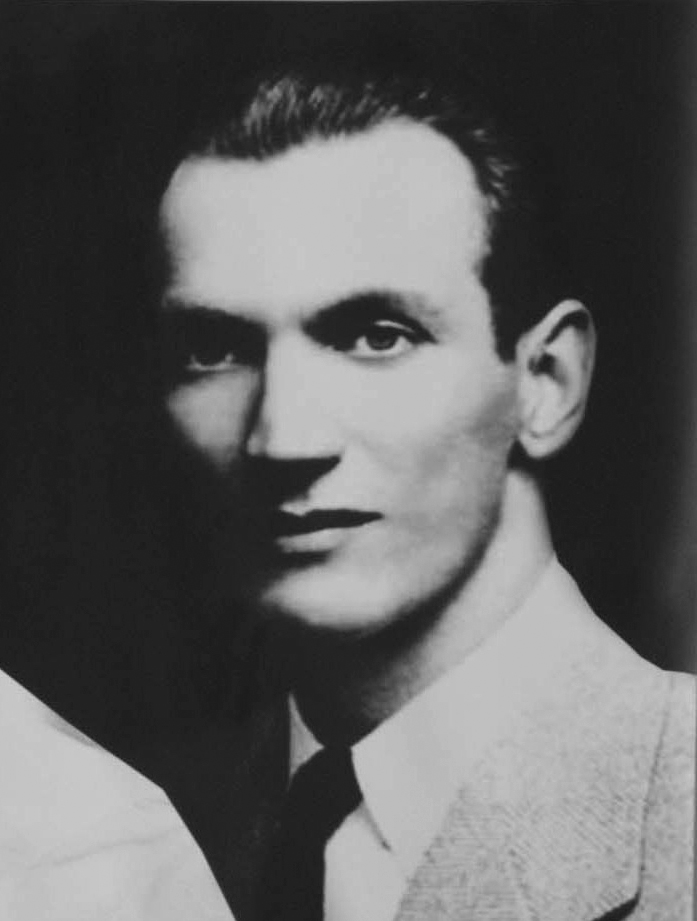
Jan Karski

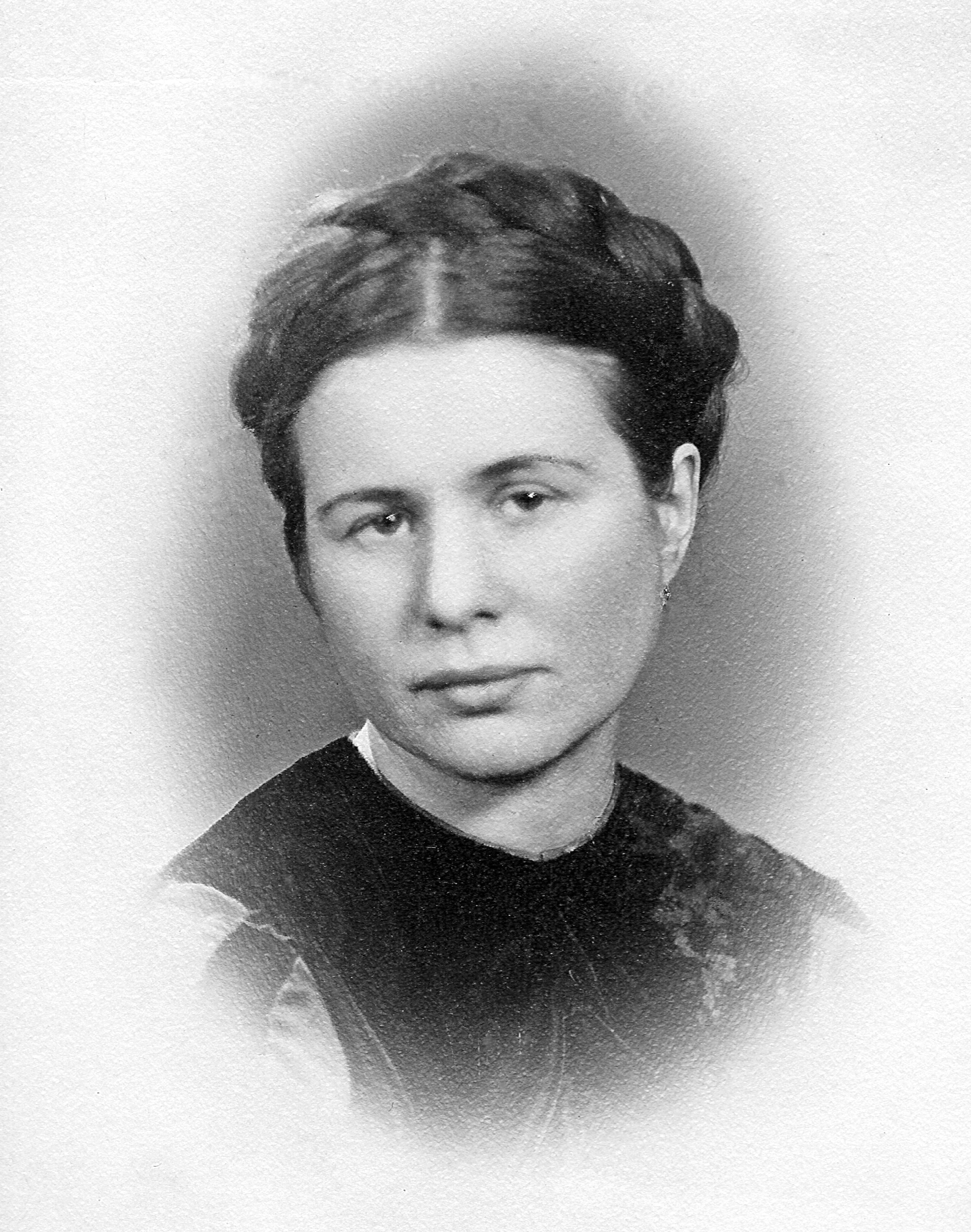
Irena Sendler

- Justyna Szaniawska (Eufemia) (1712–1799), Professed Religious of the Benedictine Nuns (Warsaw, Poland)
- Ewa Karolina Sułkowska (1814–1881), Founder of the Sisters of Our Lady of Mercy (Warsaw, Poland)
- Helena Pelczar (1888–1926), Layperson of the Diocese of Cleveland (Krosno, Poland – Ohio, United States)
- Włodzimierz Ledóchowski (1866–1942), Professed Priest of the Jesuits (Melk, Austria – Rome, Italy)
- Jewish Catholic Martyrs:
  - Rosa Adelheid Stein (1883–1942), Layperson of the Archdiocese of Köln (Lubliniec – Oświęcim, Poland)
  - Lisamaria Meirowsky (1904–1942), Layperson of the Archdiocese of Köln (Grudziądz – Oświęcim, Poland)
  - Richard Bittmann (1903–1944), Layperson of the Archdiocese of Wrocław (Strzelce – Oświęcim, Poland)
- Martyrs of World War II:
  - Czesław Broda (1885–1940), Priest of the Diocese of Przemyśl (Rzeszow, Poland – Oberbayern, Germany)
  - Kazimierz Smoroński (1898–1942), Professed Priest of the Redemptorists (Limanowa – Oświęcim, Poland)
  - Czesława Kwoka (1928–1943), Child of the Diocese of Zamość-Lubaczów; Martyr (Zamość – Oświęcim, Poland)
  - Jadwiga Gano (Alojza) (1901–1943), professed religious of the Daughters of the Most Pure Heart of Mary
  - Maria Podskarbi (Maria Akwila of the Holy Trinity) (1909–1945), Professed Religious of the Ursulines of the Roman Union (Ostrów Wielkopolski – Poznań, Poland)
  - Stefania Trznadel (Maria Kajusa of Our Lady Mediatrix of All Graces) (1910–1945), Professed Religious of the Ursulines of the Roman Union (Rzeszów – Poznań, Poland)
  - Józefa Górecka (Pelagia) (1866–1945), Professed Religious of the Sisters Servants of Mary Immaculate (Biała – Opole, Poland)
  - Hertha Meinusch (1930–1945), Young Layperson of the Diocese of Opole (Strzelce, Poland)
  - Anna Gonschior (Balda) (1910–1945), Professed Religious of the School Sisters of Notre Dame (Dobrzeń Wielki – Nysa, Poland)
  - Łucja Peter (Bonosa) (1910–1945), Professed Religious of the School Sisters of Notre Dame (Olsztyn – Nysa, Poland)
  - Magdolna Horváth (Mária Lintína) (1907–1945), Professed Religious of the Franciscan Missionaries of Mary (Kraków, Poland – Budapest, Hungary)
  - Józef Bieniossek (1880–1945), Priest of the Diocese of Opole (Kluczbork – Krapkowice, Poland)
  - Eryk Schewior (1907–1945), Priest of the Diocese of Opole (Wodzisław – Krapkowice, Poland)
  - Jadwiga Pohl (Jakoba) (1867–1945), professed religious of the Sisters of Mary Immaculate – Wrocław
  - Hermine Szroeder (Maria Optata) (1907–1945), Professed Religious of the Franciscan Missionaries of Mary (Kraków, Poland – Budapest, Hungary)
  - Kunigunda Tumińska (Adelgund) (1894–1945), Professed Religious of the Franciscan Sisters of Penance and Christian Charity (Czersk – Chojnice, Poland)
  - Paul Sawatzke (1903–1945), Priest of the Diocese of Szczecin-Kamień (Berlin, Germany – Pyrzyce, Poland)
  - Engelbert Rahmel (1891–1945), Priest of the Archdiocese of Warmia (Człuchów, Poland)
  - Monika von Ballestrem (Maria Gabrielis) (1905–1945), Professed Religious of the Franciscan Missionaries of Mary (Lublin – Głubczyce, Poland)
  - Franz Zimolong (Bertrand) (1888–1945), Professed Priest of the Franciscan Friars Minor (Dobrzeń Wielki, Poland)
  - Jadwiga Kosiorowska (Franciszka) (1888–1945), professed religious of the Sisters of the Immaculate Conception of the Blessed Virgin
  - Jadwiga Urbańczyk (Maria Speciosa) (1898–1945), professed religious of the Sisters of Charity of Saint Charles Borromeo of Trzebnica
- Izabel Łuszczkiewicz (Zofia Maria) (1898–1957), Vowed Member of the Daughters of Charity of Saint Vincent de Paul; Martyr (Kraków, Poland)
- Matylda Getter (1870–1968), Professed Religious of the Franciscan Sisters of the Family of Mary (Warsaw, Poland)
- Stanisław Kowalczyk (1935–1983), Professed Priest of the Dominicans; Martyr (Przasnysz – Poznań, Poland)
- Aleksandra Gabrysiak (1942–1993), Layperson of the Diocese of Elblag; Martyr (Wołomin – Elblag, Poland)
- Tadeusz Pankiewicz (1908–1993), Married Layperson of the Archdiocese of Kraków (Lviv, Ukraine – Kraków, Poland)
- Jan Dobraczyński (1910–1994), Married Layperson of the Archdiocese of Warsaw (Warsaw, Poland)
- Jan Karski (1914–2000), Married Layperson of the Archdiocese of Washington (Łódź, Poland - Washington, D.C., United States)
- Joseph Gluszek (1910–2002), Priest of the Diocese of Great Falls-Billings (Kraków, Poland – Montana, United States)
- Włodzimierz Fijałkowski (1917–2003), Married Layperson
- Zdisław Kobak (Cantius) (1930–2004), Professed Priest of the Franciscan Friars Minor (Toruń, Poland – Wisconsin, United States)
- Maria Stefania Górska (Andrzeja) (1917–2007), Professed Religious of the Ursulines of the Agonizing Heart of Jesus (Łódź – Warsaw, Poland)
- Irena Stanisława Sendlerowa (1910–2008), Married Layperson of the Archdiocese of Warsaw (Warsaw, Poland)
- Irena Maria Popiel (Elżbieta) (1925–2010), Professed Religious of the Benedictine Nuns of Perpetual Adoration of the Blessed Sacrament (Kraków – Warsaw, Poland)
- Albin Małysiak (1917–2011), Priest of the Congregation of the Mission (Vincentians); Auxiliary Bishop of Kraków (Żywiec – Kraków, Poland)
- Alicja Lenczewska (1934–2012), Married Layperson of the Archdiocese of Szczecin-Kamień (Warsaw – Szczecin, Poland)
- Maria Roszak (Cecylia) (1908–2018), Professed Religious of the Dominican Nuns (Kielczewo – Kraków, Poland)
- Helena Józefa Włodarczak (1931–2019), Professed Religious of the Sisters of Saint Elizabeth (Poznán, Poland – Jerusalem, Israel)
- Michal Los (1988–2019), Professed Priest of the Sons of Divine Providence (Orionine Fathers) (Dąbrowa Tarnowska – Warsaw, Poland)
- Paweł Bogdan Adamowicz (1965–2019), Married Layperson of the Archdiocese of Gdańsk (Gdańsk, Poland)

== See also ==
- Patron saints of Poland
- List of saints of the Canary Islands

== Bibliography ==
- Urbański, Stanisław and Henryk Noga. Żywoty polskich świętych = Lives of the Polish saints. Warszawa: Verbinum, 2004.
