= Saint Stanislaus of Szczepanów's Church, Bydgoszcz =

Church in Bydgoszcz, Poland

Coordinates: 53°07′40″N 18°06′00″E

Saint Stanislaus of Szczepanów's Church
- Polish: Kościół św. Stanisława Biskupa i Męczennika w Bydgoszczy
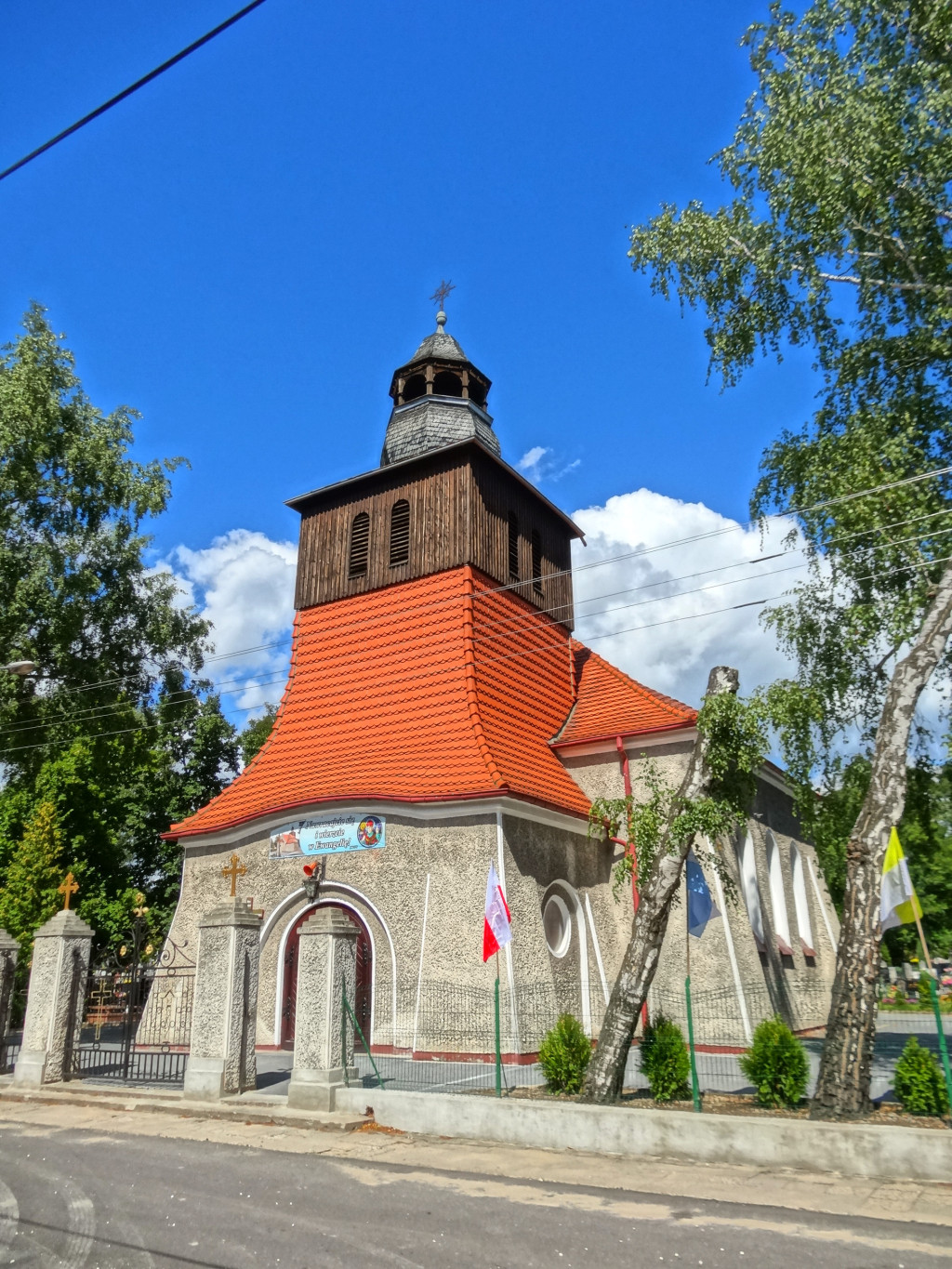
- Saint Stanislaus of Szczepanów's Church, Bydgoszcz
- Saint Stanislaus of Szczepanów's Church
- Location: 1 Kapliczna street, Bydgoszcz
- Country: Poland
- Denomination: Catholic Church
- Website: http://www.parafiaswstanislawa.pl/

History
- Status: Church
- Dedication: Saint Stanislaus
- Dedicated: 21 May 1925

Architecture
- Functional status: Active
- Heritage designation: Nr.601223, A/858/1-2 28 June 1995
- Architect: Bogdan Raczkowski
- Architectural type: Polish national style
- Completed: 1925

Specifications
- Materials: Brick

Saint Stanislaus's Church is a wood and brick Catholic church, situated on the eastern side of Bydgoszcz, Poland. Located at 1 Kapliczna street, its patron saint is Stanislaus of Szczepanów. The building and part of its surroundings have been registered on the Kuyavian-Pomeranian Voivodeship Heritage List since 1995.

== History ==
=== First project ===
The plans to build a church in the district of Siernieczek was a result of the booming demography of the eastern parts of Bydgoszcz. From 1890 to 1914 and during the interwar period, these industrial suburbs, organized into 5 areas (Siernieczek, Brdyujście, Jasiniec, Kapuściska, Czersko) welcomed around 5,000 workers in nearby factories. The inhabitants were predominantly Polish and Catholic.

After 1920, these plots were incorporated into the city of Bydgoszcz. However, the nearest churches remained out of reach: downtown St. Martin and Nicholas or St. Nicholas' Church in Fordon were located at least 6 kilometres (3.7 mi) away. Furthermore, Siernieczek district was divided between two parishes in different dioceses:

- a parish belonging to archdiocese of Gniezno for houses adjacent to Kapuściska, Czersko districts;
- a parish belonging to diocese of Chełmno for houses adjacent to Brdyujście and Jasieniec districts.

On April 8, 1923, Stanisław Cichosławski, a civil servant, established the "Association for the Construction of the Church of Siernieczka and the Surroundings" (Polish: Stowarzyszenie Budowy Kościoła dla Siernieczka i okolic). The patron of the project was Father Tadeusz Skarbek-Malczewski (1873-1929), pastor of Bydgoszcz Cathedral.

Article in "Dziennik Bydgoski" registering the association, May 17, 1923

The association had 68 members and its board comprised senior officials and industrialists living in the area:

- Leon Jackowski, director of the timber plant in Siernieczek;
- Chryzostom Michalak from Brdyujście;
- Stanisław Cichosławski, clerk of the Postal Chamber of Accounts (Polish: Pocztowa Izba Obrachunkowej);
- Andrzej Nikiel, head of the train station of the Kapuściska district;
- Walerian Kadow, Hipolit Sawicki and Wacław Pasikowski, city councillors.

The design of the church was realized by Bydgoszcz city councillor and architect Bogdan Raczkowski. In addition, the municipal authorities donated to the association the plot of land, where stood an ancient police stationhouse, initially to house the association, later to be the future plot of land of the church.

Local citizens and workers initiated the construction of the church in June 1923: the Association reported that 107 men, 16 women and 54 children worked on the construction site. They started with the demolition of the former police station, then laid down the building foundations followed by the base of the church tower and the sacristy. A the end of 1923, the half-finished building was covered with a roof. On May 18, 1924, the church tower was completed: it was solemnized by a mass celebrating the blessing of the cross. On October 6, 1924, the construction site was visited by Stanislaw Kostka Łukomski then auxiliary bishop of Poznań.

The local press and associations were pivotal to raise money for the construction from the citizens of Bydgoszcz, mainly via the organization of kermesses, which proceeds were allocated to the project funding. Eventually the church was finished in October 1925.

The construction of the church cost at the time about 110,000 PLN, including 60,000 PLN for building materials. The project took advantage of donated material, together with free laborers' work or free administrative tasks.

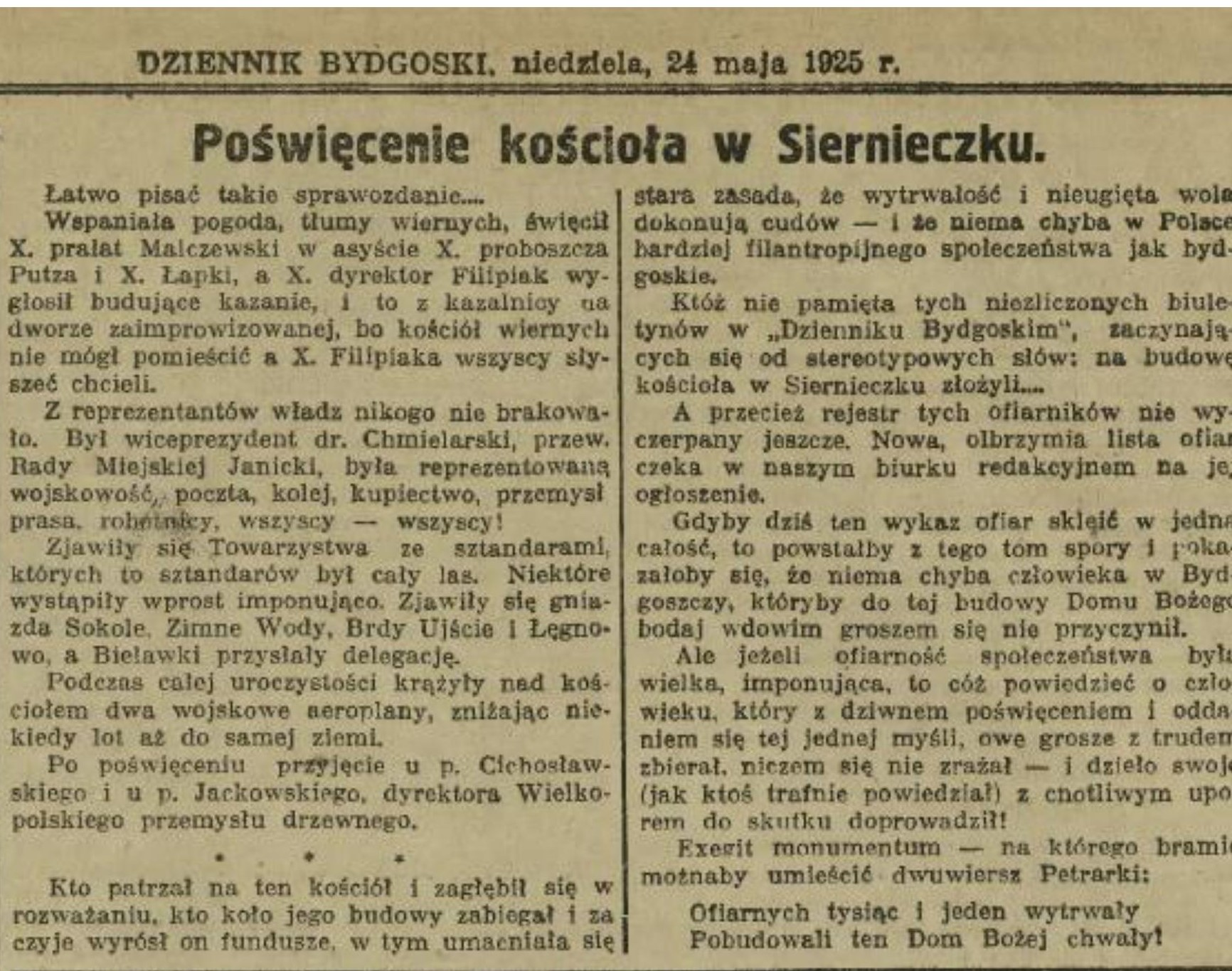
Dedication of the Church, Dziennik Bydgoski, May 24, 1925

The church dedication ceremony took place on May 21, 1925, attended by the local clergy, city authorities, Bydgoszcz associations, army representatives, merchants, local press and several thousand of Catholic citizens. During the ceremony, two military airplanes circled over the church. The main celebrant was Father Tadeusz Skarbek-Malczewski. The church was then devoted to the Holy Family. At the time, it was the first consecration of a new Catholic church in Bydgoszcz since Poland regained its independence in November 1918. In 1926, the adjoining street, which was a sandy road till 1995, was named "Ulica Kapliczna" (English: Chapel street): it connected Fordońska and Witebska streets. On March 6, 1927, the church was visited by Polish Primate August Hlond and in August 1927, by Stanisław Okoniewski, bishop of Chełmno.

Answering the demands of the local population, Saint Stanislaus's parish was soon incorporated under a single diocese, the archdiocese of Gniezno, hence including also the districts of Siernieczka, Fordonek and Brdyujście. Furthermore, on March 6, 1927, the Polish Primate changed the church dedication to Saint Stanislaus of Szczepanów the martyr (Polish: Św. Stanisław ze Szczepanowa i Męczennik).

From 1932 onwards, a baptism register was kept and for the first time, 47 children were admitted for their First Communion. Until 1946, the church was dependent from the cathedral of Bydgoszcz: services were held irregularly, though every Sundays and holidays with the participation of priests from the parish cathedral or missionaries from the parish of Saint Vincent de Paul Basilica.

=== Second World War and later years ===
In 1937, father Antoni Świadek became the substitute parish priest. Between 1937 and 1939, he led the construction of a presbytery by the church. During WWII, he was arrested in 1942 and taken to Dachau concentration camp where he was murdered on January 16, 1945. Three years later, the Parish Council requested the city authorities to rename "Kapliczna Street" to "Father Anthony Świadek street": it was refused. In 1999, Antoni Świadek was beatified by Pope John Paul II.

Eventually, a parish was established at the Church of St. Stanisław of Szczepanów and Martyr on October 1, 1946, by a decree of Cardinal August Hlond. The first incumbent was Father Jan Więckiewicz, who died in 1947, leaving the parish without a minister till 1948. His successors in this position were:

- Father Józef Batkowski (1948-1957) ran many building projects. One can cite, among others, a catechetical room at the presbytery, a fencing around the cemetery, the construction of the arcade porch and a new pipe organ. He renovated the interiors and the heating in the church and the presbytery. He had the bell tower erected and the bells, named after St. Stanisław and Saint Joseph, blessed on May 8, 1950. Finally, he welcomed several sisters of Saint Elizabeth at the parish from 1952 to 1957, working as catechists and organists. Father Batkowski's merit was to organize the parish life in the difficult Stalinist period, with the dissolution of all church associations ordered by the authorities at the end of 1950;
- Father Tadeusz Pomin (1957-1971) renovated the interiors and the pipe organ. In 1966, he set up a mission cross but failed to get the consent of the authorities for the expansion of the church. The same authorities filed a lawsuit against him and several other priests, which lasted for four years and ended with acquittal of the accused;
- Father Józef Kozłowski (1971-1974) had new heating installed in both the church and the presbytery, and a first sound system mounted;
- Father Konrad Hildebrand (1974-1993) carried out a major renovation of the church tower and roofs, which included paving the external ambulatory, setting up a new electrical installation, renovating the interior floor, the conciliar altar, the pews and the external plasters. He died in this post and was buried in the parish cemetery in October 1993;
- Father Narcissus Wojnowski (1993-2008) carried out a major renovation of the presbytery and the church, installed a new altar, stained glass windows and church tabernacle;
- Since 2008, Father Janusz Tusk is the current minister.

On May 7/8, 1995, a pontifical mass has been celebrated Bishop Bogdan Wojtuś to commemorate the 70 years of the existence of the church in Siernieczek.

== Architecture ==
The architectural form of the building mirrors traditional Polish rural wooden churches.

=== Exteriors ===
Saint Stanislaus's church is made of plastered brick and displays a tower topped by a wooden ridge turret with a spherical cupola. The southern tower shelters the entrance porch which leads into the rectangular nave. The chancel is somehow narrow and closed to the north by a pentagonal apse. The sacristy lies to the west of the nave.

The presbytery's ceiling is vaulted while the nave and the apse exhibit a wooden ceiling. The building is covered with a hipped roof while buttresses can be seen at each wall corners.

Beneath the entrance porch, a memorial plaque has been placed in 1948 to commemorate Blessed Antoni Świadek, first parson and WWII martyr.

=== Interiors ===
The interiors have been initially equipped by community donations: three chasubles, a missal and two marble holy water fonts offered by Father Malczewski, a golden chalice by the Sawicki family, an altar by the builder Jarocki and a pulpit by the firm "Wielkopolski Przemysł Drzewny".

During the interwar period, the decoration was enriched with banners of local parish associations. The Stations of the Cross were consecrated on February 14, 1926. On June 29, 1931, the altar of the Heart of Jesus, funded by the Obermayer family, was consecrated.

Today, the interiors still display patches of a rich fresco decor, unfortunately mainly repainted and partially plastered. The balustrade and the gallery above the entrance are covered with floral polychrome motifs.

Inside the presbytery are three stained glass windows offered in 1924, by Bernard Śliwiński, Bydgoszcz president, and Artur Franke, a city councillor. They portray the Holy Family, Saint Stanislaus of Szczepanów and Saint Bernard.

The pipe organ was built in 1952, by Józef Sobiechowski from Bydgoszcz. It was consecrated by Father Jan Konopoczyński before an inaugural concert played by Szczepan Jankowski.

== Cemetery ==
The cemetery is located around the church, spreading between Kapliczna and Fordońska streets. It covers an area of 2.5 hectares (6.2 acres) and hosts about 3 thousand tombstones. A large concrete cross and a brick funeral chapel stand in the middle of the cemetery.

The cemetery was built between 1923 and 1925, as the same time as the church was being constructed. Following the establishment of Saint Stanislaus as an independent parish in 1946, the graveyard was then used as the parish cemetery.

In 1994, under the lead of Father Narcissus Wojnowski, then parish priest, the burial site was enlarged by a purchase of a swathe of land located near its northern border and Fordońska street. In 1995, the oldest site area, together with the church, have been entered on the Kuyavian-Pomeranian Voivodeship Heritage List.

== Gallery ==
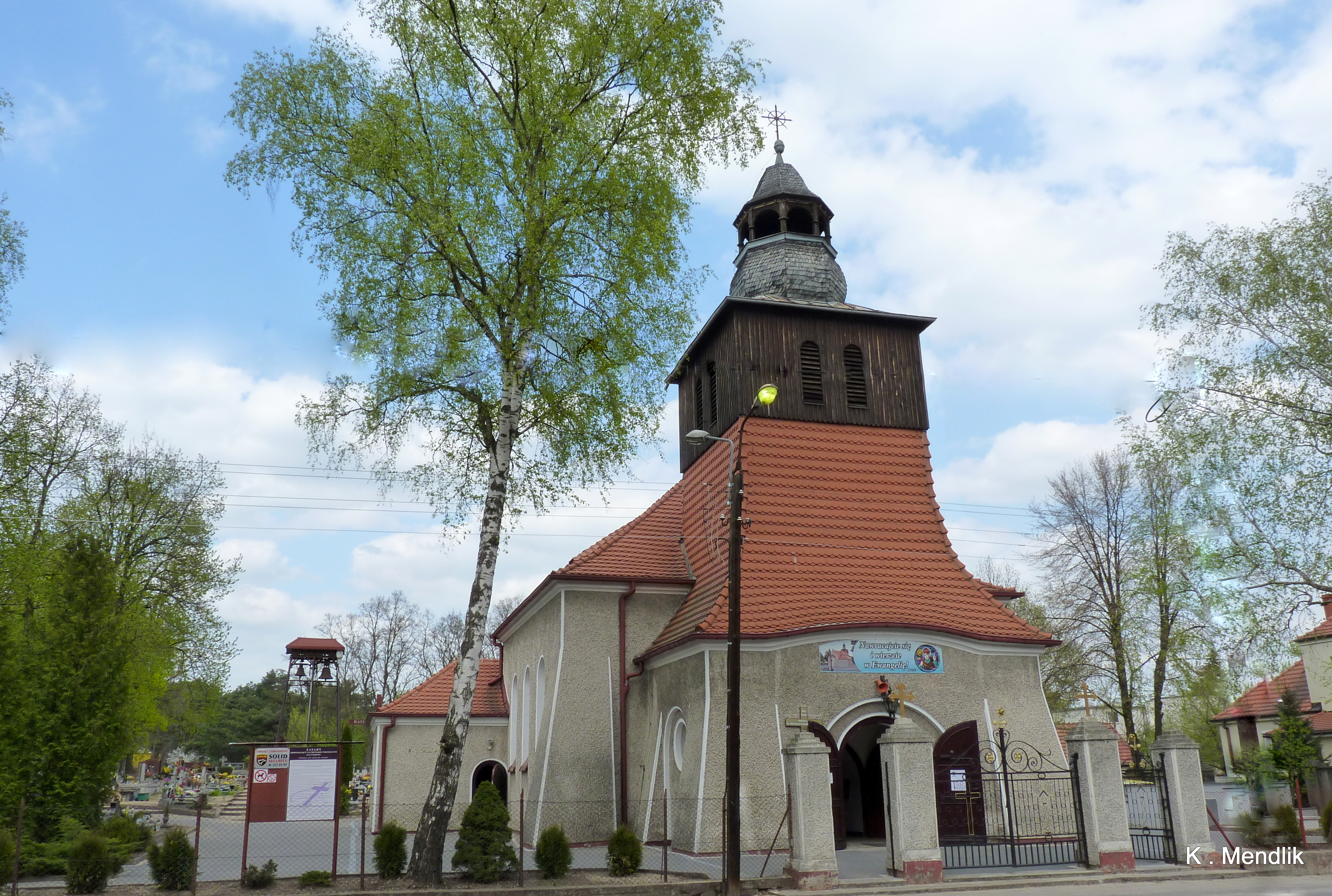
View from the street

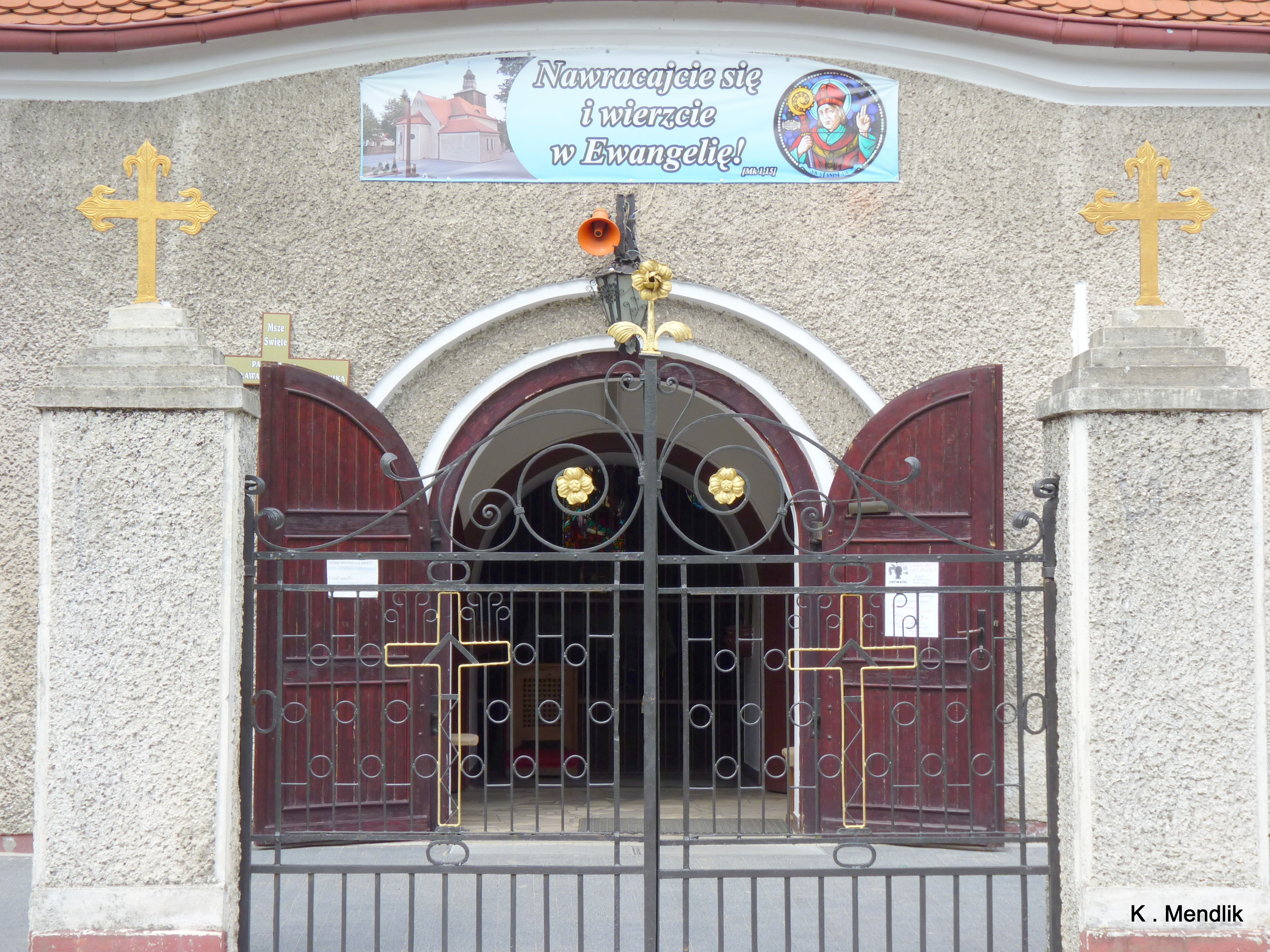
Gate and porch

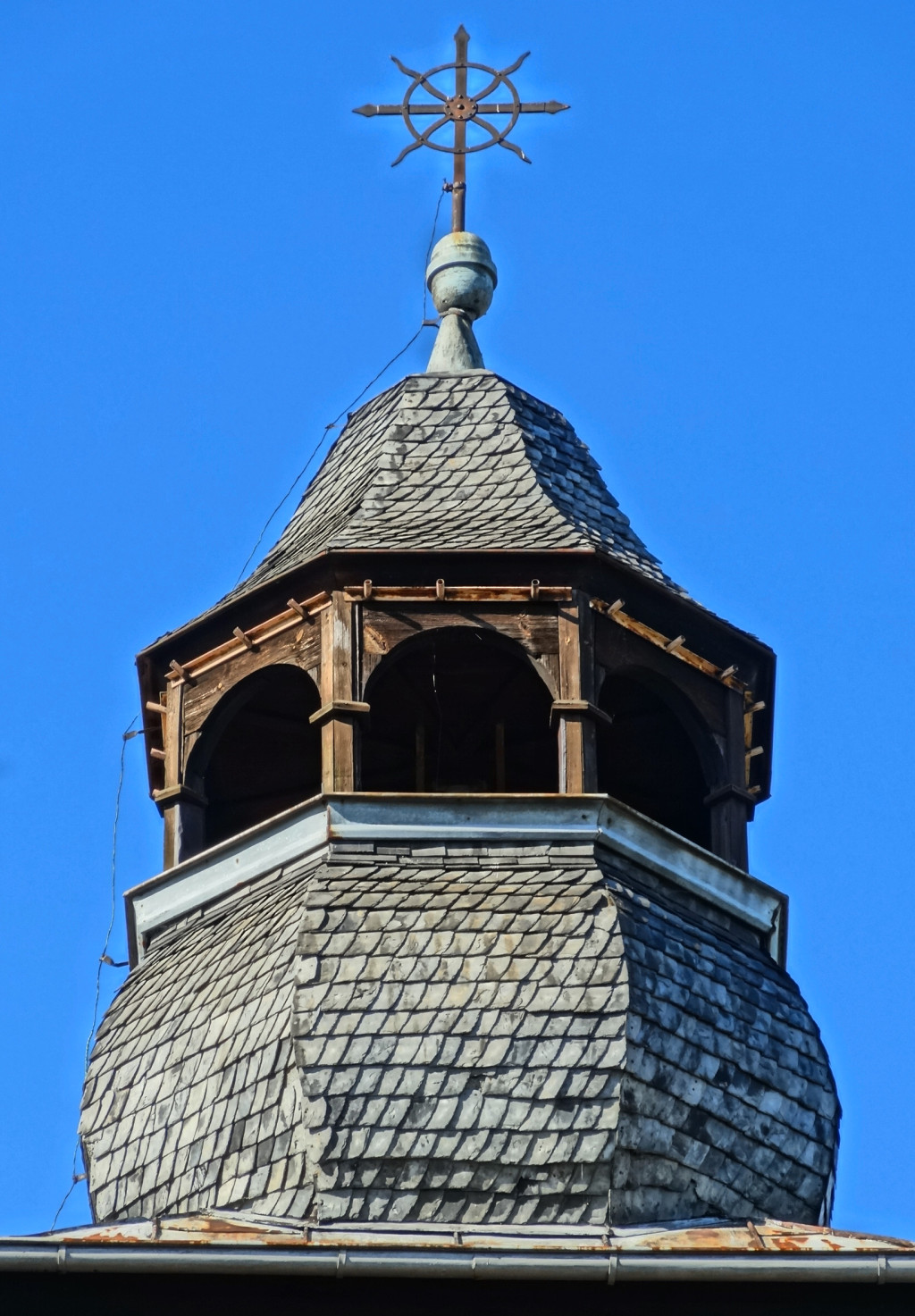
View of the wooden ridge turret

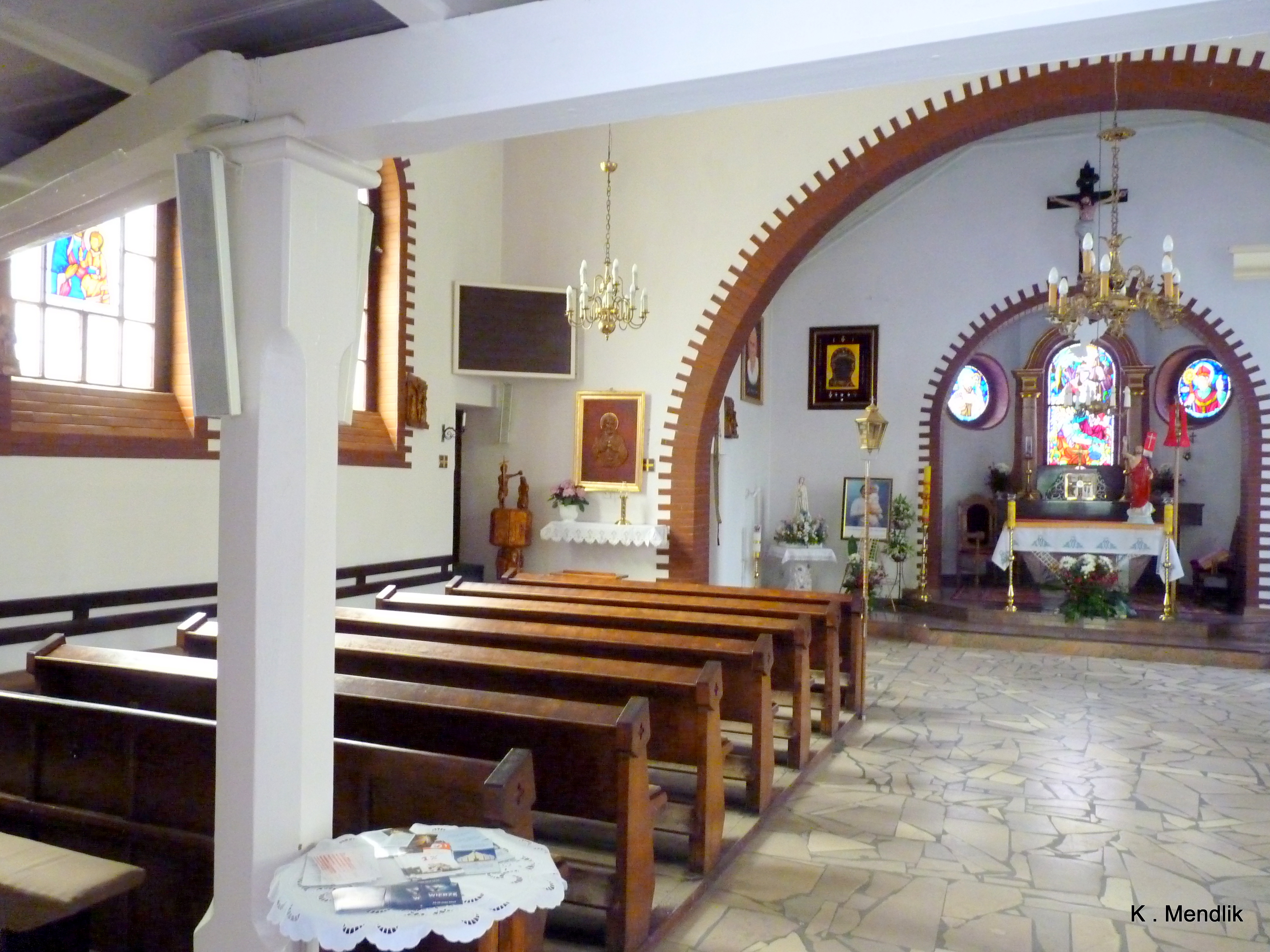
View of the nave from the entrance

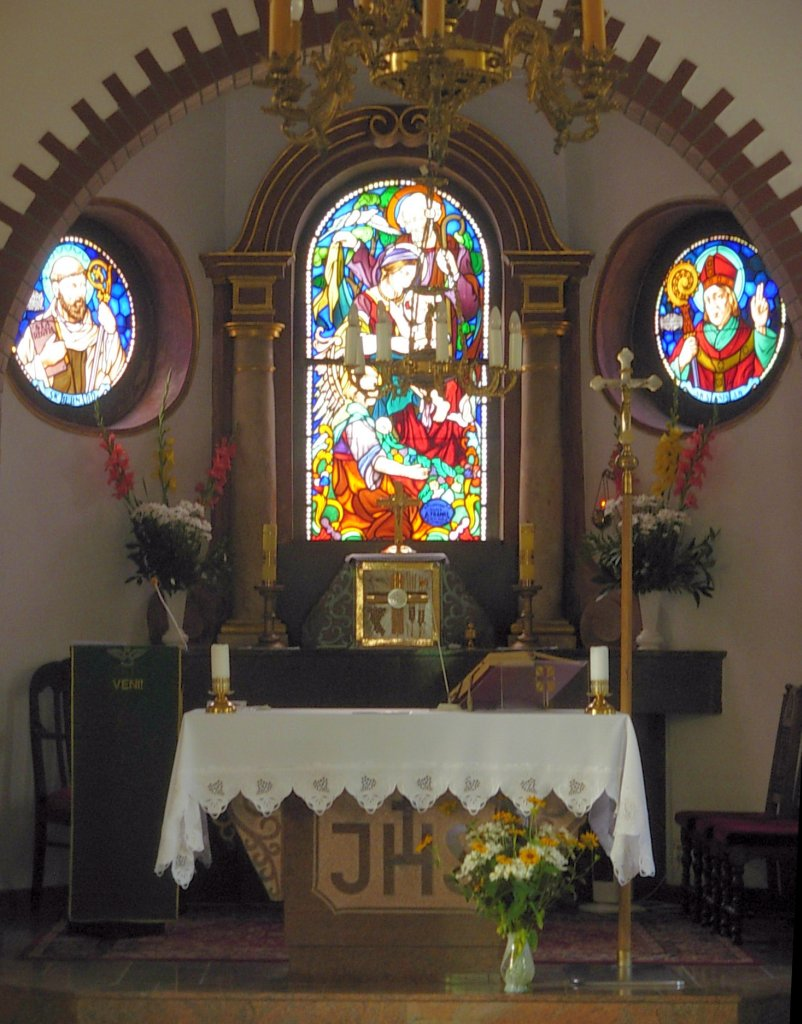
View of the three donated stained glasses window from 1924

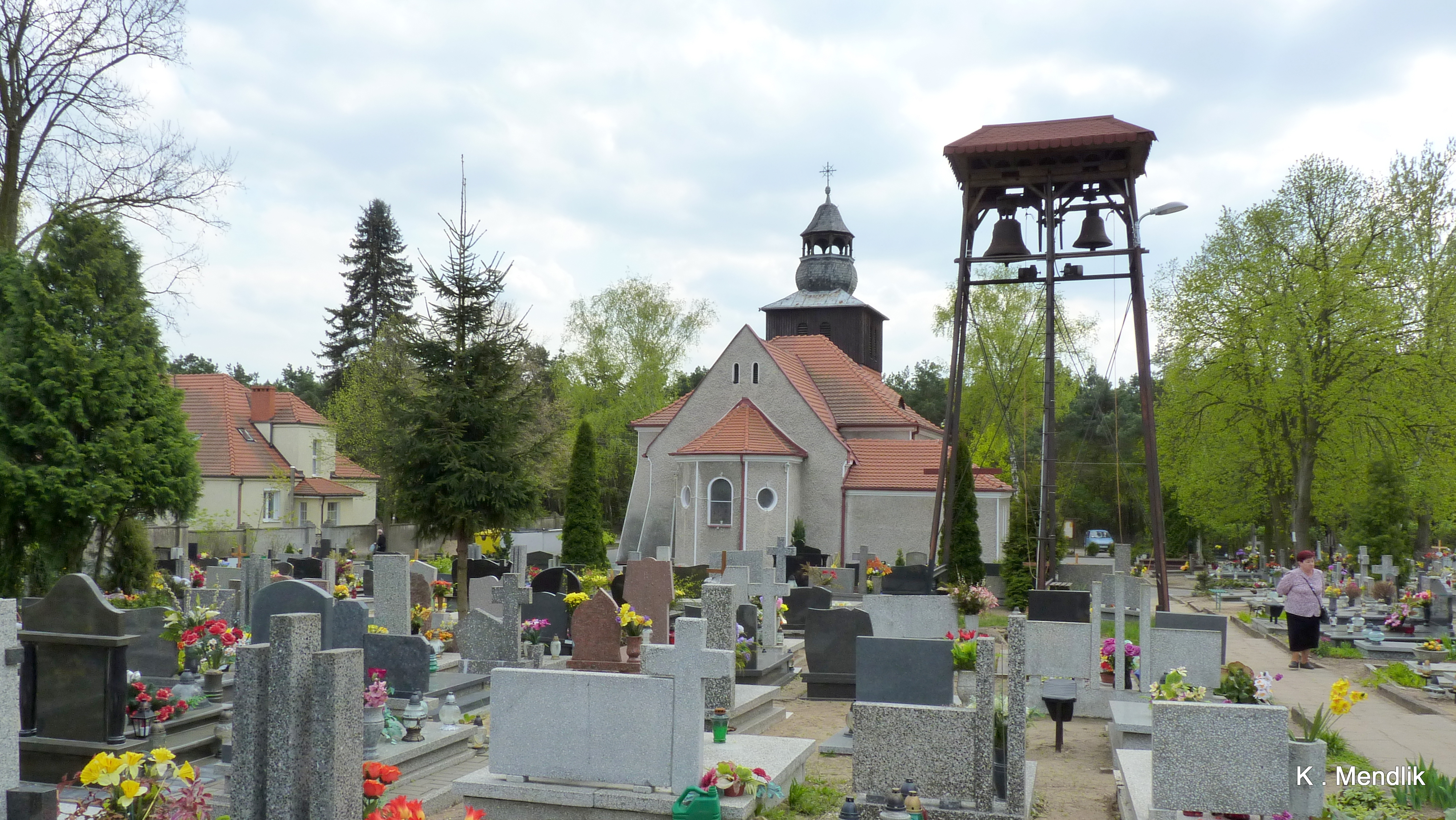
Back view from the cemetery

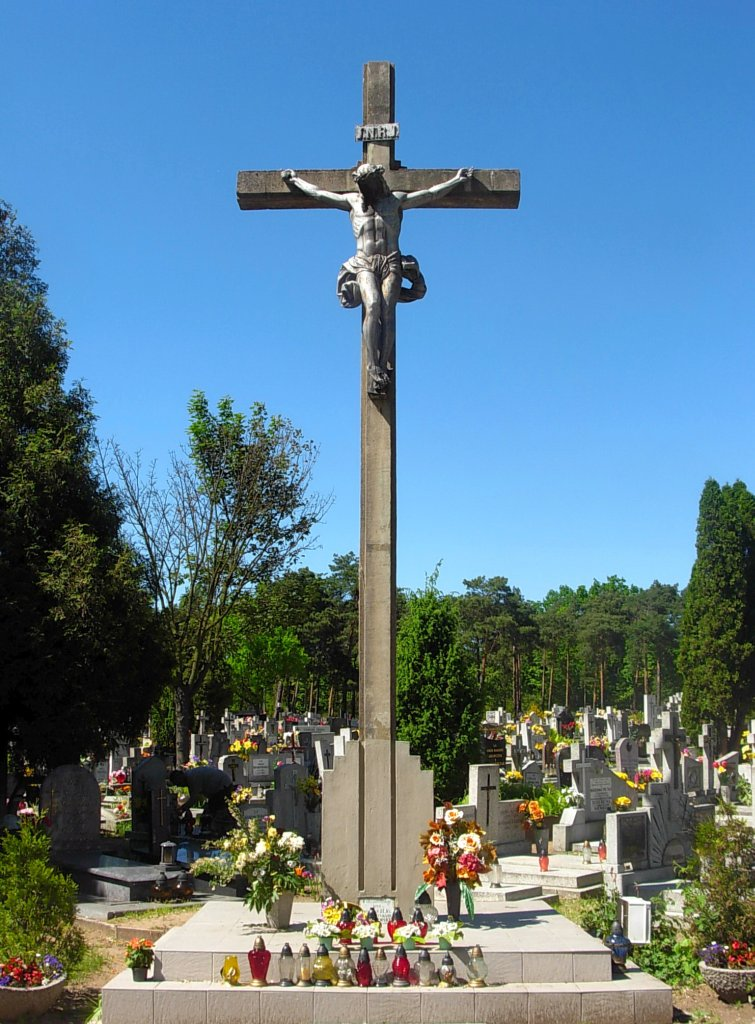
Monumental cross in the cemetery

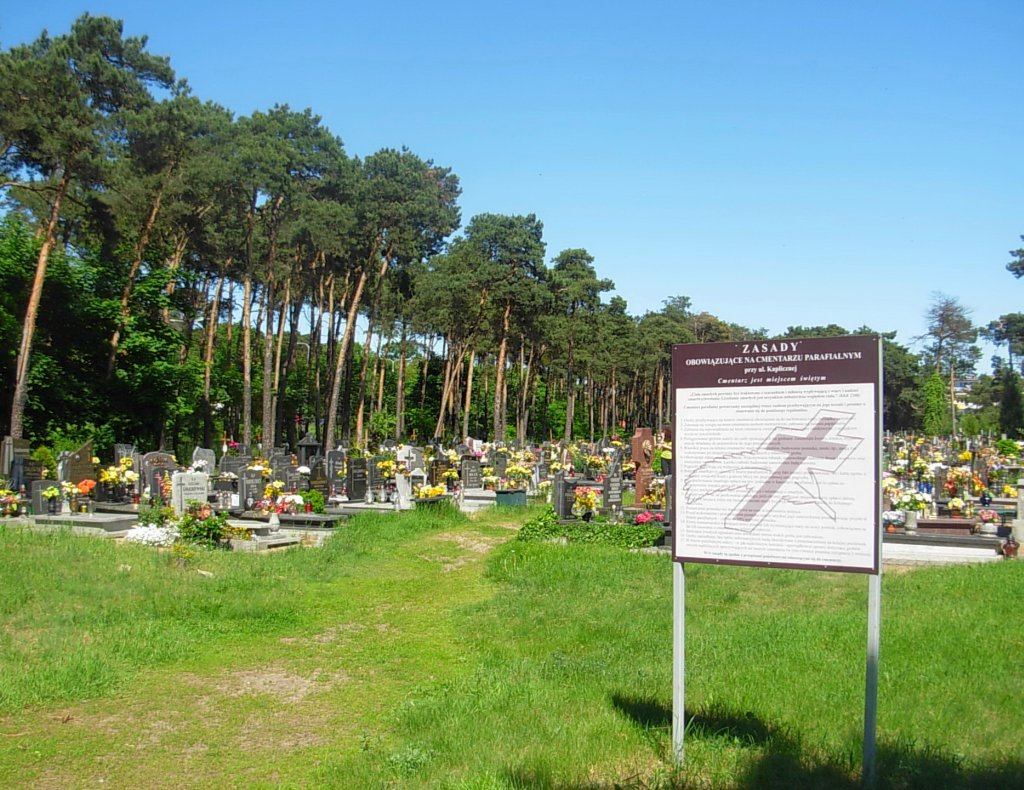
View of the cemetery in summer

== See also ==
- Bydgoszcz
- Church of Our Lady of Perpetual Help in Bydgoszcz
- Bogdan Raczkowski
- Antoni Świadek
- Bernard Śliwiński

== Bibliography ==
- (in Polish) Derenda, Jerzy (2006). Piękna stara Bydgoszcz – tom I z serii Bydgoszcz miasto na Kujawach. Bydgoszcz: Towarzystwo Miłośników Miasta Bydgoszczy.
- (in Polish) Parucka, Krystyna (2008). Zabytki Bydgoszczy: minikatalog. Bydgoszcz: "TIFEN" Krystyna Parucka. ISBN 9788392719106.
- (in Polish) Baranowski, Michał (1996). Jubileusz na Siernieczku. Kalendarz Bydgoski. Bydgoszcz: Towarzystwo Miłośników Miasta Bydgoszczy. pp. 210–212.
- (in Polish) Nowicki, Piotr (1996). Zarys Dziejów Parafii w Sierniecku (1923-1995). Kronika Bydgoska XVII. Bydgoszcz: Towarzystwo Miłosnikow Miasta Bydgoszczy - Bydgoskie Towarzystwo Naukowe. pp. 139–152.
- (in Polish) Jarkiewicz, Zenon (1996). Parę uzupełnień do historii budowy kościółka na Siernieczku. Kronika Bydgoska XVIII. Bydgoszcz: Towarzystwo Miłosnikow Miasta Bydgoszczy - Bydgoskie Towarzystwo Naukowe. pp. 365–368.
