= Antoni Świadek =

Polish Roman Catholic priest and martyr

Antoni Świadek

Antoni Świadek (1909–1945) was a Polish priest from Bydgoszcz. He died in the Dachau concentration camp and was beatified by the Catholic Church. He is one of the 108 Martyrs of World War II.

== Biography ==
He was born on March 27, 1909, in Pobiedziska, in Poznań. He was the son of Władysław, a wheelwright, and Władysława née Mieleszyński. He attended the gymnasium in Kępno, where in 1928 he passed the secondary school leaving examination. He was active in the Marian Sodality and in scouting.

Immediately after graduating from high school, he came to the seminary in Poznań, where on June 10, 1933, he was ordained a priest. In July 1933 he became vicar of the parish church in Bydgoszcz and remained there until his arrest in 1942. He was also appointed a scout and military chaplain. In 1937, he was assigned as a substitute to the affiliate church of St. Stanisław Bishop in Bydgoszcz on the outskirts of Siernieczek.

After the German invasion of Poland in September 1939, he volunteered as a chaplain to one of the Polish units and remained with them until their defeat. Then he worked in a hospital for Polish prisoners of war until he returned to Bydgoszcz .

During the German occupation of Poland, he tried to carry out pastoral activity. Contrary to the prohibitions of the Nazi authorities that all liturgical rites be celebrated in German, he often used Polish during services and funerals. He heard confessions in Polish and secretly prepared children for First Holy Communion. He looked after the poor and met young people he knew from his previous work in organizations, especially in scouts.

This activity did not escape the Germans' attention. Denounced by one of the residents of the district, whose confessions he had heard in Polish, in the summer of 1942 he was arrested by the Gestapo and imprisoned in Bydgoszcz prison. In October 1942, he was taken to the Dachau concentration camp, where he was given the number 37193. Shortly after his arrival, he fell ill with typhoid fever, from which he recovered.

As a priest, he was particularly brutally treated and forced to work hard. He worked in Bekleidungslager commandos, later on plantations, and finally in the camp transport commando. At the beginning of January 1945 he fell ill with typhus. This disease became the cause of his death, which occurred on January 25, 1945. His body was thrown into the so-called Totenkammer, and then buried in a mass grave outside the camp near the village of Deutenhofen.

== Beatification ==
In 1991, Świadek was included in a group of 108 Polish martyrs during World War II being considered for beatification. On June 13, 1999, he was beatified in Warsaw by Pope John Paul II. His liturgical memorial is on January 21 .

In the church of St. Stanisław Bishop in Bydgoszcz, there is a commemorative plaque, placed in 1948. At that time, an attempt was also made to rename the neighboring street (Kapliczna) in his honour but this was not accepted by the public authorities. In the church of St. Archangel Michael in Pobiedziska there is a marble commemorative plaque with his image.

== See also ==
- List of Nazi-German concentration camps
- The Holocaust in Poland
- World War II casualties of Poland
