= Bogdan Raczkowski =

Polish architect (1888–1939)

Bogdan Feliks Raczkowski
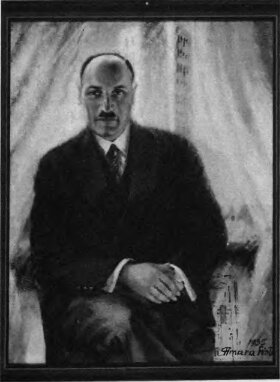
- Raczkowski c. 1935
- Born: 12 March 1888; Posen, German Empire
- Died: 4 October 1939 (aged 51); Bydgoszcz, Poland
- Occupations: Architect, engineer
- Spouse: Maria Raczkowska née Zawadzka (1895–1939)
- Children: Danuta Walentyna, Zdzisław
- Parent(s): Walentyna Raczkowska née Dąbrowska and Feliks Raczkowski

Bogdan Feliks Raczkowski (12 March 1888 – 4 October 1939) was an influential engineer, builder and urbanist in Bydgoszcz from the 1920s till the outbreak of World War II.

== Personal life ==
=== Early life ===
Bogdan was born in Poznań on 12 March 1888 to Feliks and Walentyna née Dabrowska. He graduated from the Saint Mary Magdalene High School in Poznań (Polish: Liceum Ogólnokształcące św. Marii Magdaleny), like his older brother Tadeusz Jan who later became an agronomist and head of the School of the Chamber of Agriculture in Bydgoszcz.

He then carried on his studies at the faculty of architecture of Lviv university. There, he rubbed shoulders with students, some of whom outstanding engineers or architects:

- Jan Sas Zubrzycki (1860–1935)
- (in Polish) Witold Minkiewicz (1880–1961);
- (in Polish) Jan Bagieński (1883–1967);
- (in Polish) Tadeusz Obmiński (1874–1932).

Shortly before the outbreak of First World War, Bogdan Raczkowski, as a young graduated engineer, moved to Kharkiv to handle the construction of his first project. There, he met and married on 24 August 1917, Maria Zawadzkie (born on 23 February 1895) the daughter of a railway official. As a result of the Russian October Revolution the same year, the couple fled Russia by boat across the Black Sea and got back home to Poznań after a journey through Romania, Hungary and Czechoslovakia. In Poznań, their daughter Danuta Walentyna was born on 23 May 1920.

=== Life in Bydgoszcz ===
The family settled in Bydgoszcz in spring 1921 at 3, Stanisław Moniuszko street. On 29 December 1921 he became a city councilor and chaired the Office of Ground Construction. After a dispute at the municipal council, Bogdan Raczkowski was dismissed these positions in April 1934: he then became an appraiser at the Bydgoszcz branch of Bank Gospodarstwa Krajowego. On her side, Maria was active in Bydgoszcz branch of the Polish White Cross, the social movement created in February 1918 by Helena Paderewska, second wife of Ignacy Jan Paderewski.

Fleeing the Nazi invasion, the Raczkowski's left Bydgoszcz and moved to Marie's family estate in Kutno in September for one month. When they came back, their house at 1, Asnyka street was occupied by a German officer: hence they moved to live at a cousin's flat, Stefan Jeżowski, on Weyssenhoff Square. Nazi authorities arranged for them to pick up few of their belonging from their former house on 2 October, in the afternoon: when Bogdan and his daughter went to collect their belongings, they found the villa surrounded by the Gestapo. Both of them, together with Maria were arrested and shot on 4 October 1939, in the forest north of Bydgoszcz (Polish: Las Gdański). Only their son Zdzisław escaped the round up, as he stayed with friends at that time. He quickly left Bydgoszcz and hid for the entire period of the war under the name of Zbigniew Koźmian. To make matter worse, Tadeusz, Bogdan's brother, was executed at the Valley of Death in late October 1939.

Bogdan Raczkowski also painted pictures: landscapes of places he visited (Zakopane, Ciechocinek, Hel, Orłowo, Kharkiv, Rostov, Sevastopol, Capri, Rome). From 1931 onward, he had been a board member of the Society of Friends of Fine Arts in Bydgoszcz.

== Professional career ==
In 1921, Bogdan supported an urban development plan in the area delimited by streets Mościcki (now Sportowa), Chopina and Moniuszki. His family lived in one of the houses of the project, located at 3 Moniuszki street.

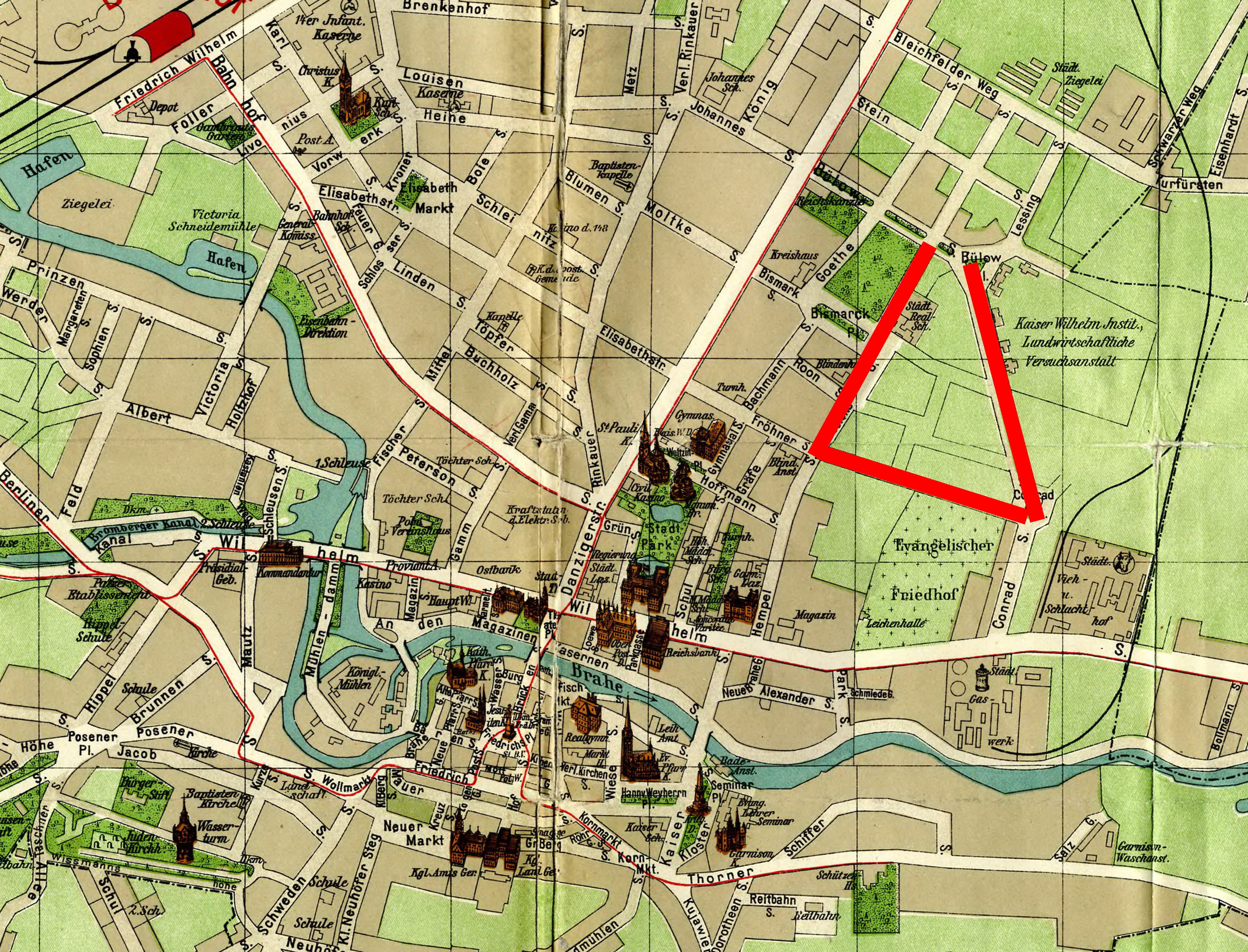
Map of Sielanka, 1908

More broadly, Bogdan Raczkowski carried on the urbanization of Sielanka (English: Idyll) district, initiated before the first World War. In the 1920s, 50 plots for building were defined with stringent building guidances regarding the height and width of the houses, number of their rooms, even the type of fence. The 50 houses were built by the end of the 1930s. At the same time, Raczkowski prepared an expansion project to give an area further north (Skrzetusko) an homogeneous character (sector defined by streets Płocka, Chodkiewicza, Sułkowskiego and Kozietulskiego). First realizations include today's houses at 5/7/11 Płocka street.

=== 1926–1936 Bydgoszcz development program ===
Bogdan Raczkowski devised a grand urbanization project for the city, intending to support private construction initiatives and identifying specific areas to be developed. In addition to Sielanka and Skrzetusko districts, he focused his attention to streets Czarna Droga, Dwernickiego, Libelta, Niemcewicza and Piotrowskiego.

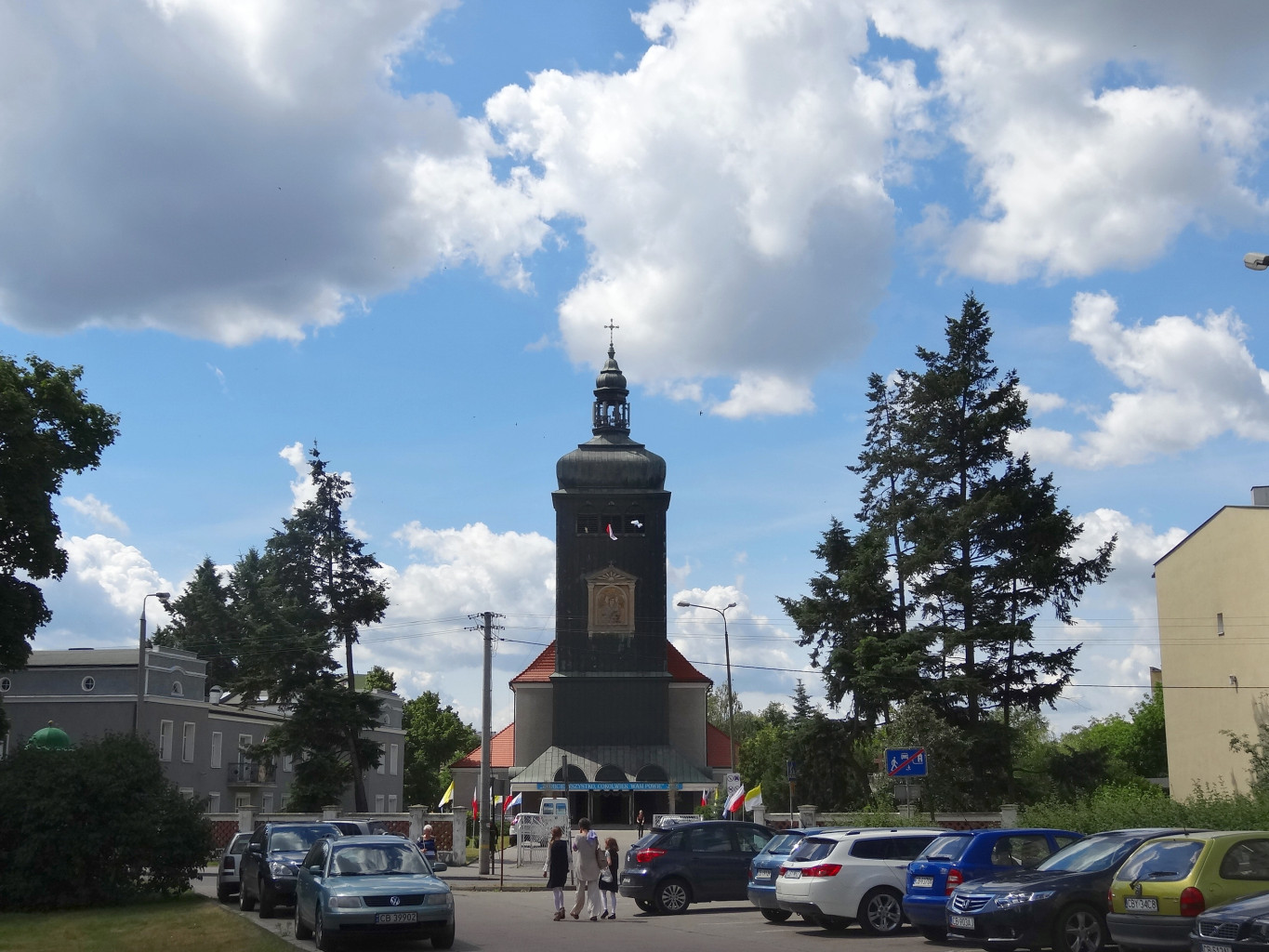
View of Szwederowo district

His idea was to assign districts purposes:

- residential for Bielawy, Skrzetusko, Szwederowo, Bielice, Wilczak and Okole;
- worker's dwellings for Miedzyń and Jachcice;
- factories at Kapuściska, Zimne Wody, Łęgnowo, Siernieczek.

The last chapter of this extensive project was aiming at planning the urbanization of Leśny district, so as to become a showcase of Bydgoszcz for people entering the city from the north. With that ambition, in October 1933, the architect divided the 30 hectares (300,000 m^{2}) area into 9 plots. This project was completed only on the eastern side of Gdańska Street, as the Ministry of Military Affairs did not allowed the development on the western part.

== Works in Bydgoszcz ==
Bogdan Raczkowski's education at the faculty of Lviv gave him the taste for new trends in architecture. At a time when neoclassicism was declining, technical and industrial progress opened up building potentials, with state-of-the-art materials (steel and glass) and innovative methods. In addition to the following realizations, Raczkowski also conceived habitations at Babia Wieś (1926–1927), at 22–38 Żwirki i Wigury street (1930) and prepared in the early 1920s a project -never carried out- for the basilica of St. Vincent de Paul in Bydgoszcz.

=== Building at 13 Piotrowskiego, 1923–1925 ===
This tenement displays classical shapes on a 4-storey façade, topped by rosettes.

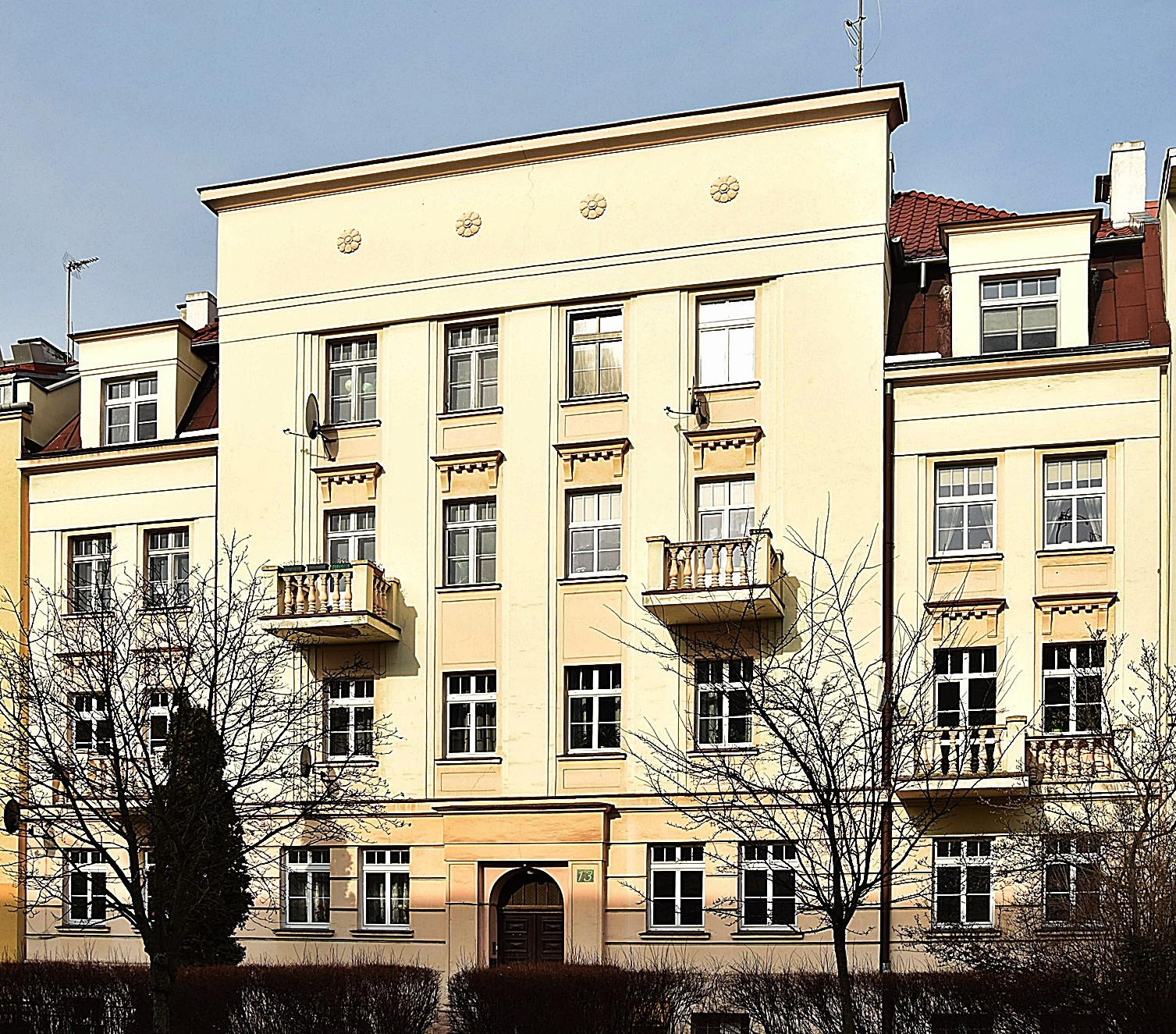
Tenement at 13, Piotrowskiego

=== Saint Stanislaus Church in Bydgoszcz, 1923–1925 ===
Saint Stanislaus Church in Bydgoszcz was registered on Kuyavian-Pomeranian Voivodeship Heritage List (Nr.601224, A/858/1-2) 28 June 1995 Located at 1, Kaplicznej street, the church is dedicated to Stanislaus of Szczepanów. The City Council donated the plot where a former police station stood: works of demolition of the latter started in June 1923.

The funds for the construction were gathered by Bydgoszcz citizens. The church steeple was completed on 18 May 1924, and the formal consecration took place on 21 May 1925. The design refers to Polish wooden churches. The stained glasses in the chancel dating back to the inception of the church (1924) have been funded by Bydgoszcz mayor Bernard Śliwiński and city councillor Arthur Franke.

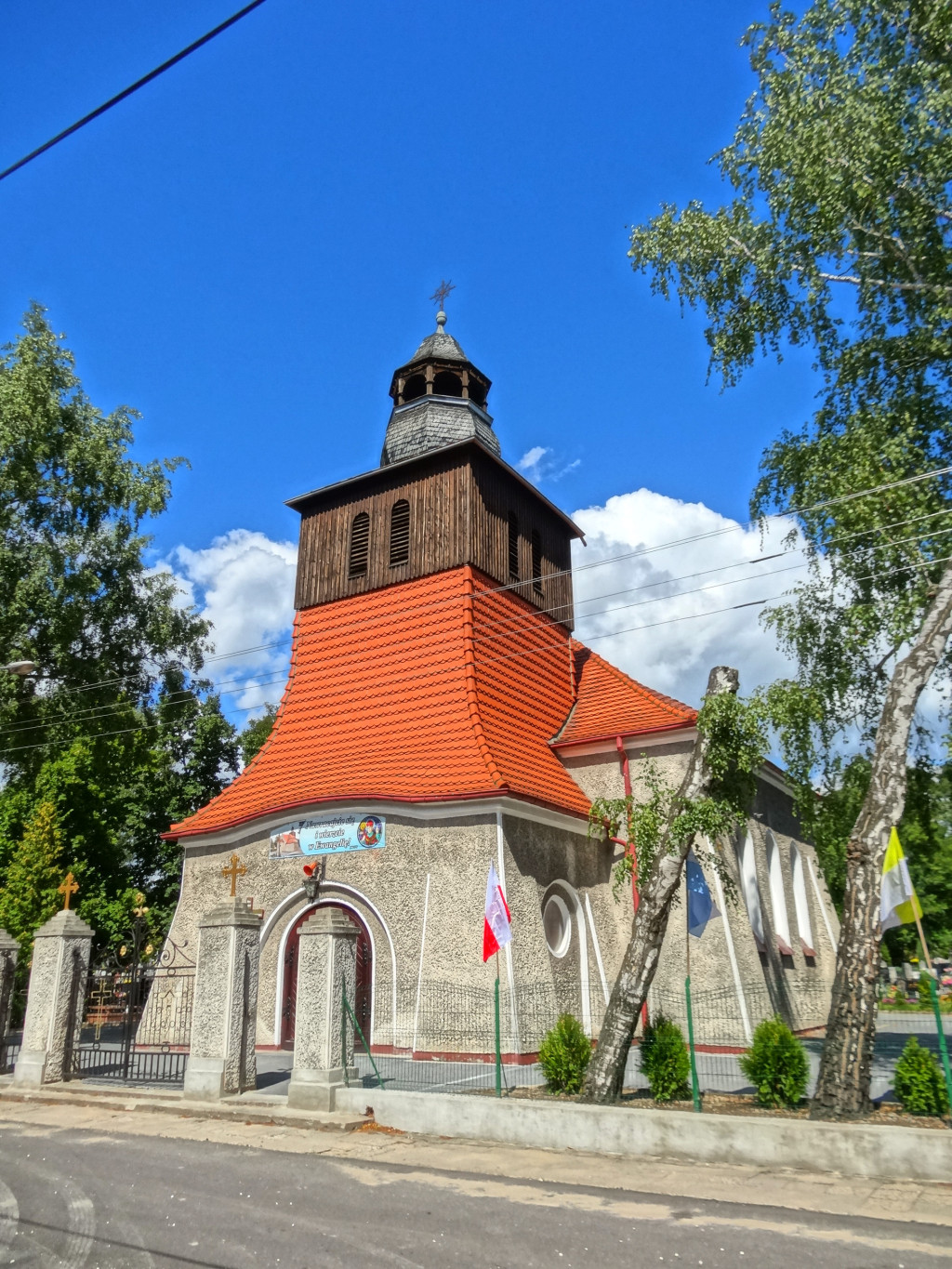
View of the church from the street

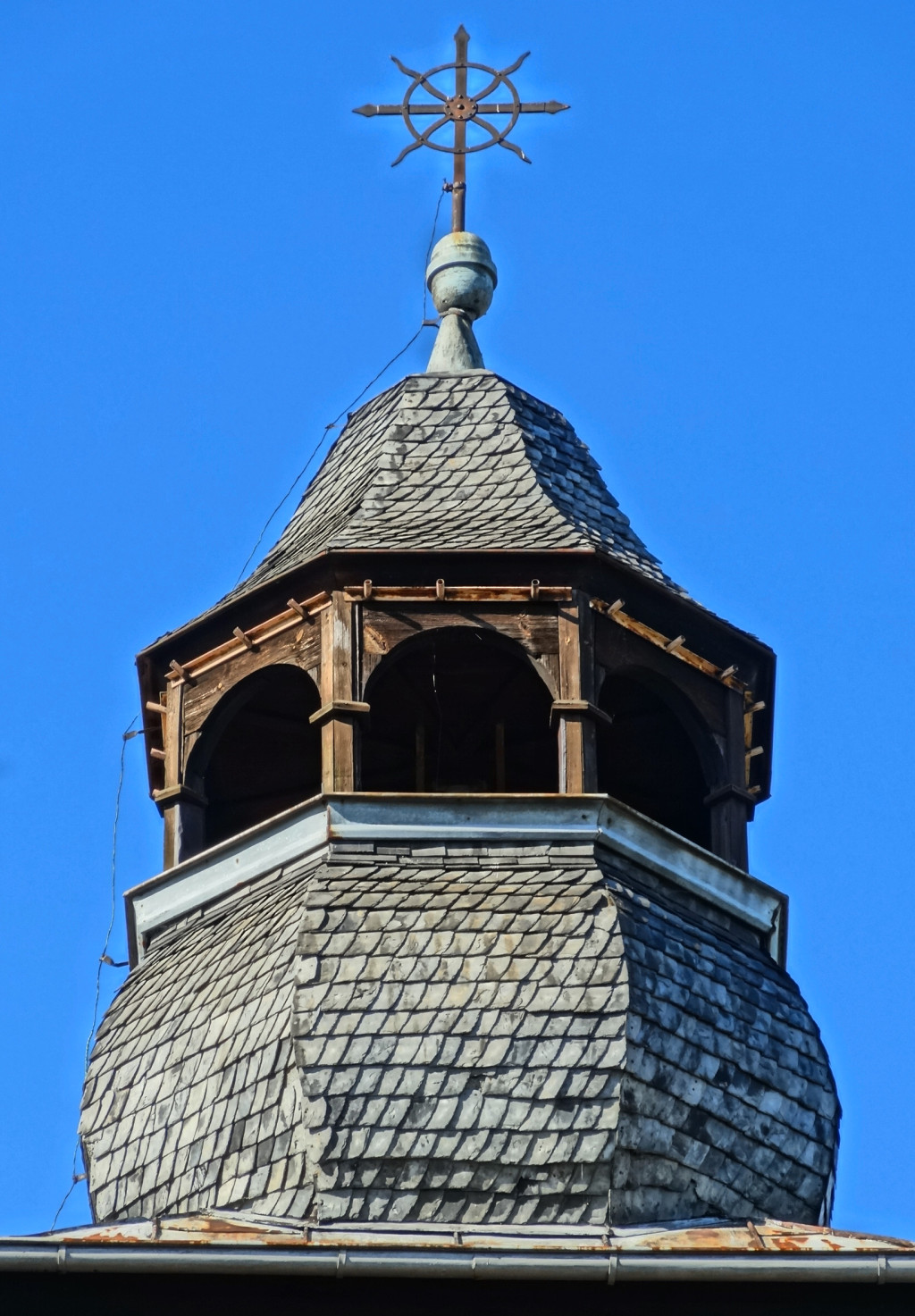
Detail of the steeple

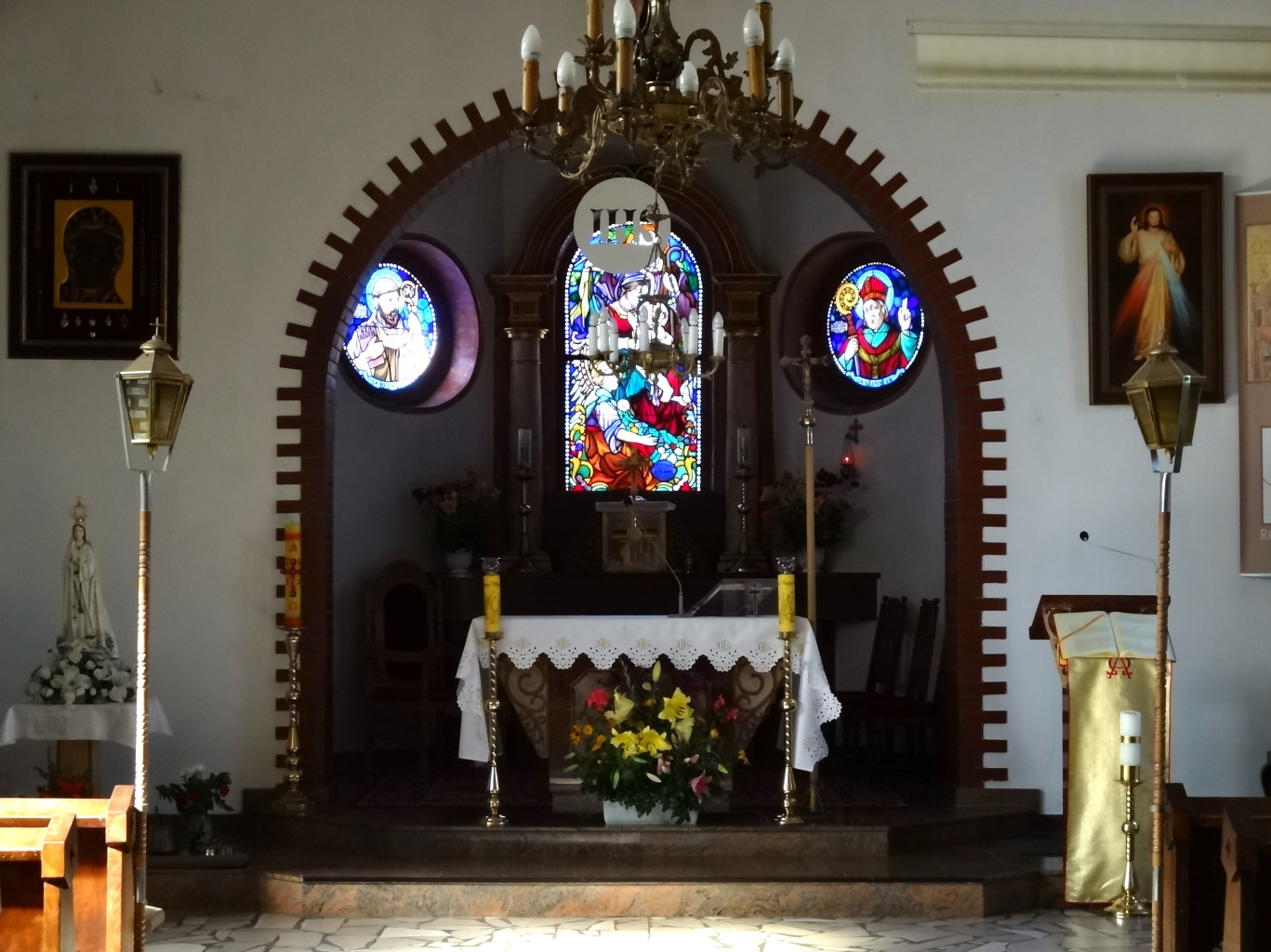
Chancel and stained glasses

=== Building at 45 Grudziądzka street, 1927 ===
The edifice has been designed to accommodate old people, augmenting the capacity of an existing facility at 1 Szubińska street. The previous and outdated house was put into service on 9 December 1885 as an element of one of the first hospital ensemble in Bydgoszcz funded by a donation of Ludwika Giese-Rafalska, the owner of an estate in the south-east of the city.

Raczkowski's edifice could host 80 residents in a variety of rooms and included a chapel, a large dining-room, a terraced garden and attic rooms for servants or workshops. The building was inaugurated on 29 July 1928 by the President of the Republic of Poland, Ignacy Mościcki. Nowadays, the building houses the fifth Department of the District Court of Bydgoszcz, in charge of Family and juveniles affairs. It has been renovated in late 2017.

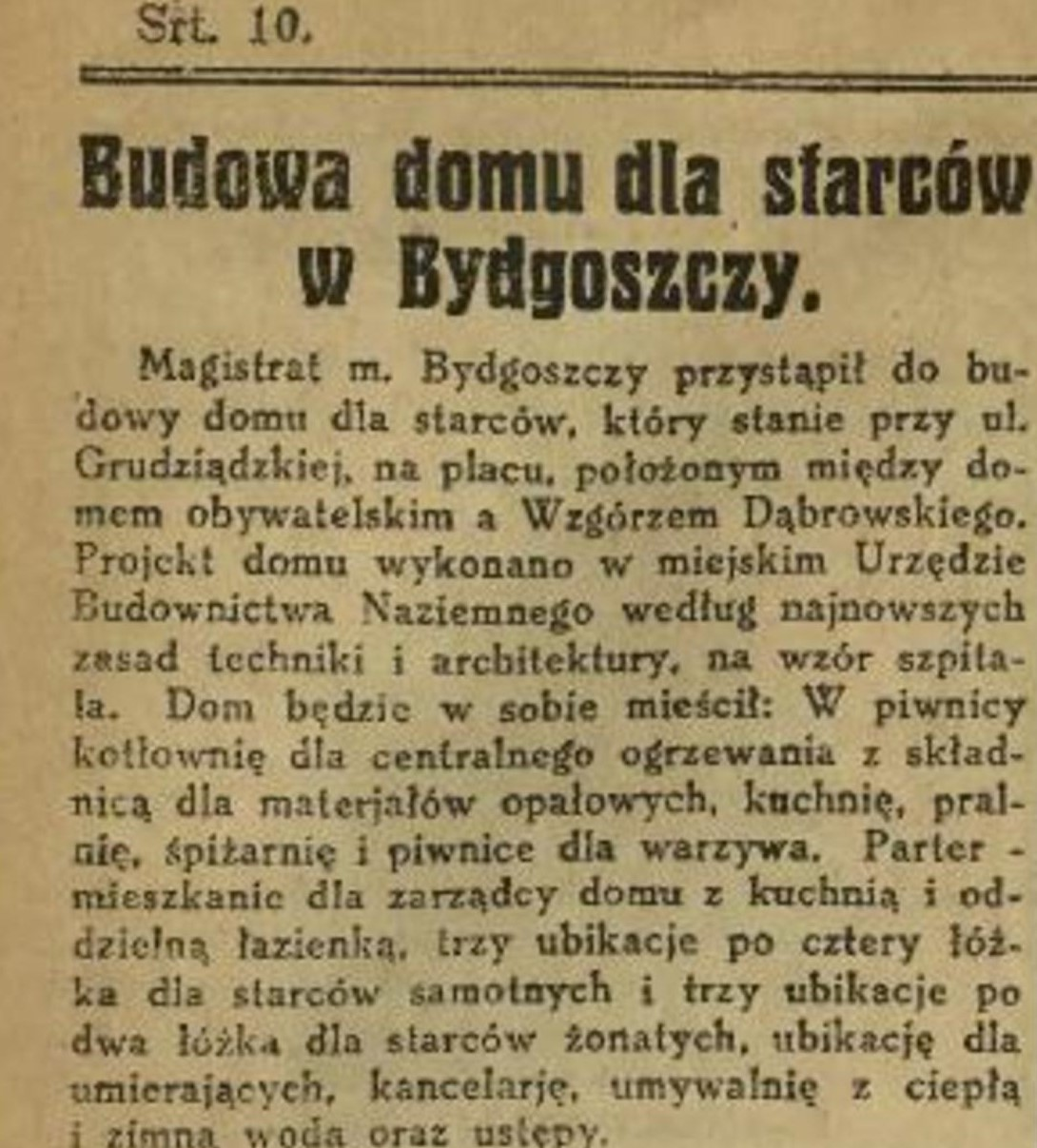
Article relating the building in 1927

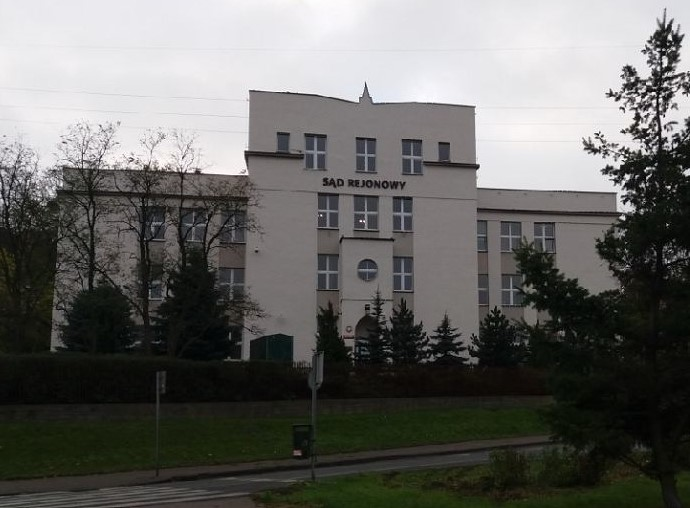
View from Grudziądzka street

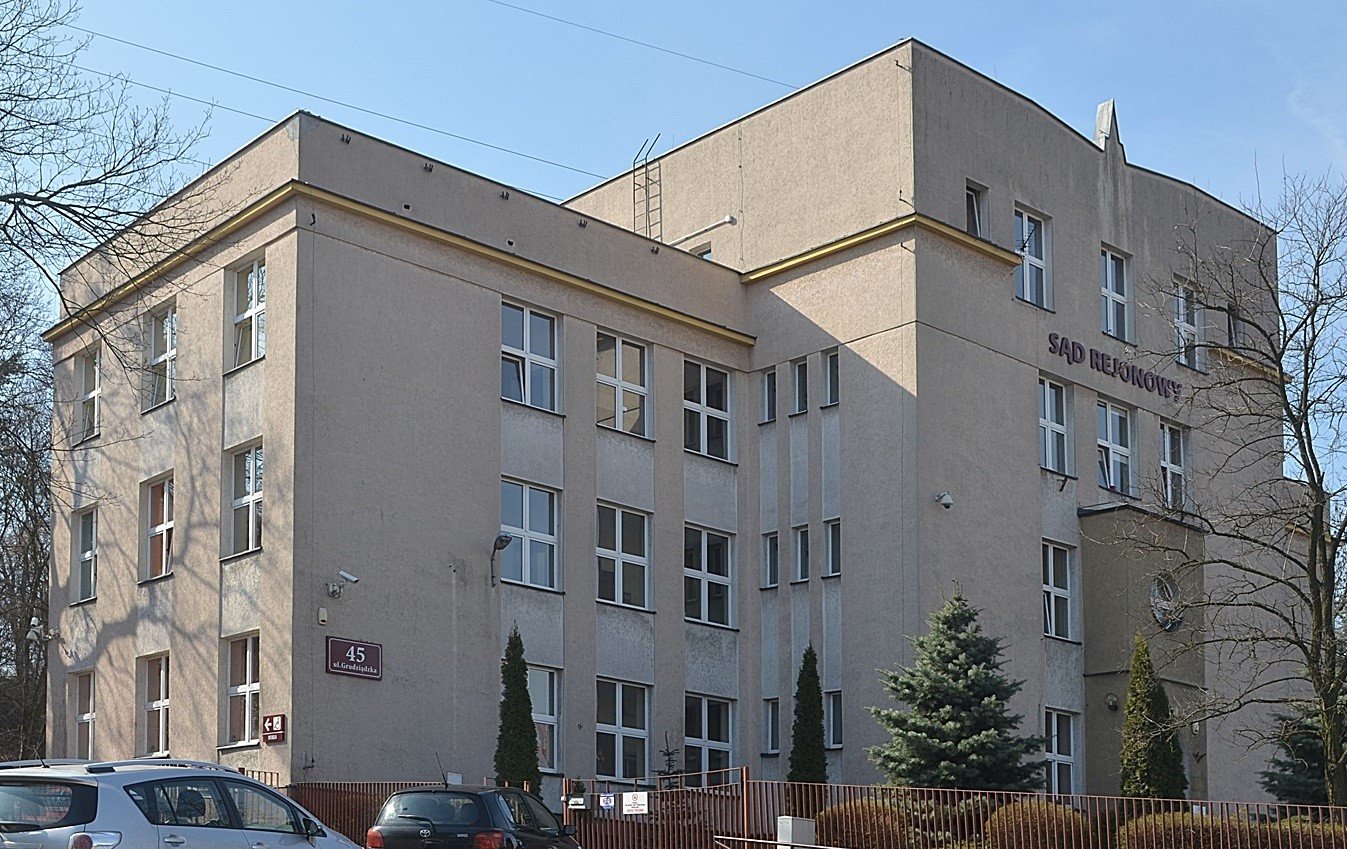
Side view from the parking lot

=== Polonia Bydgoszcz Stadium, 1924–1929 ===
Raczkowski designed the Polonia Bydgoszcz Stadium, unveiled on 3 August 1924. Conceived as an athletics facility, the architect also supervised the following additions: a football pitch (1926), a cycling track (1927), reinforced concrete 200-seat grandstand (April 1928) and athletics equipment with 6 training pitches (1929). Today, it is used mostly for speedway fixtures. It is home stadium of Polonia Bydgoszcz sport club.

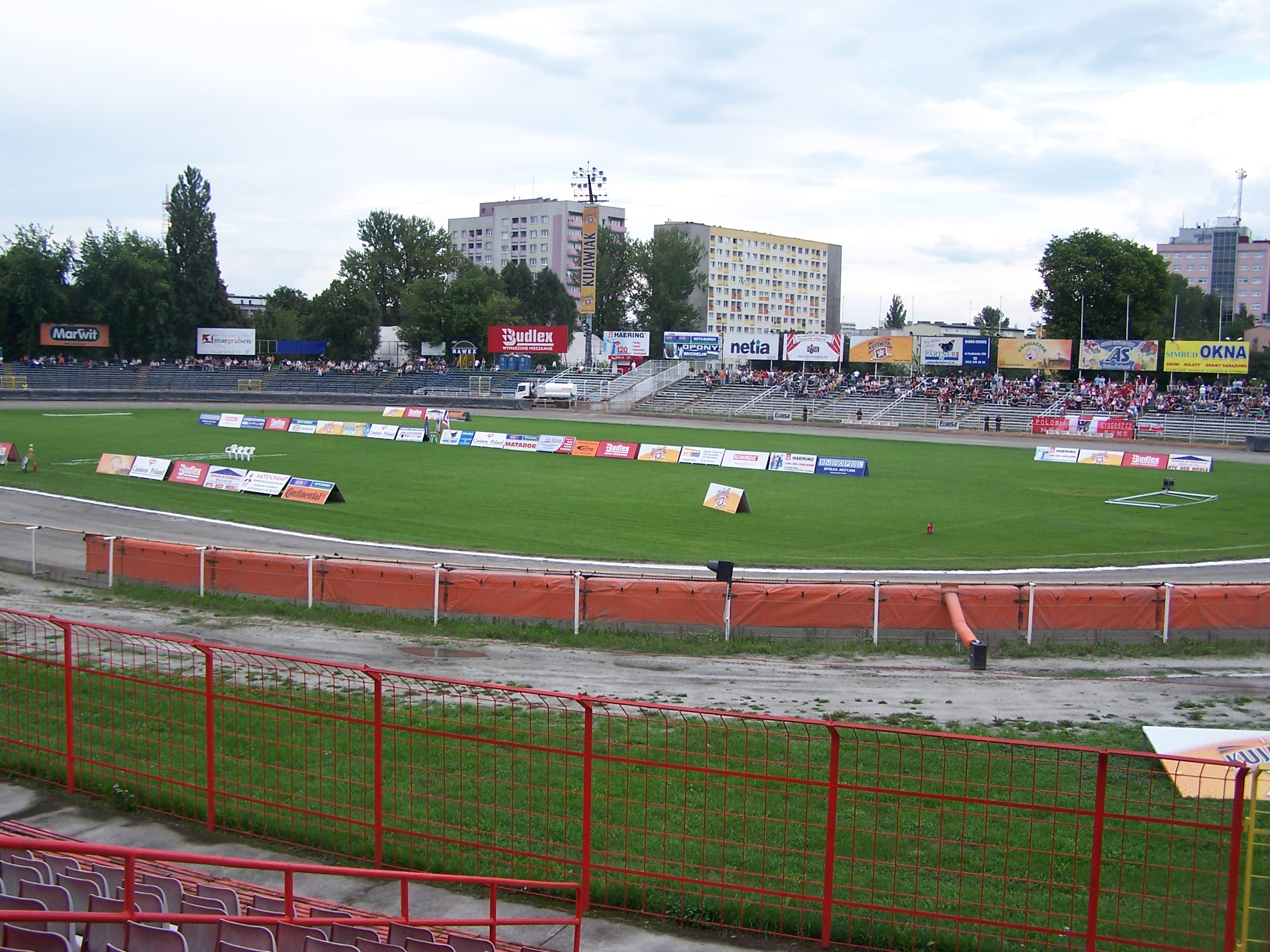
Global view

=== Tenements at 5 to 23 Babia Wieś street, 1925–1927 ===
1925–1927 , by Bogdan Raczkowski

Modernism

This housing estate was built in the second half of the 1920s, after a decision of the municipal authorities. At the time, the numbering of the ensemble was "3a" to "3d".

Each building has a rectangular strip of land for the cultivation of vegetables and flowers. On both sides of the arched entrances, one can notice loggias . A renovation has been launched by the city in 2020 and will last several years.

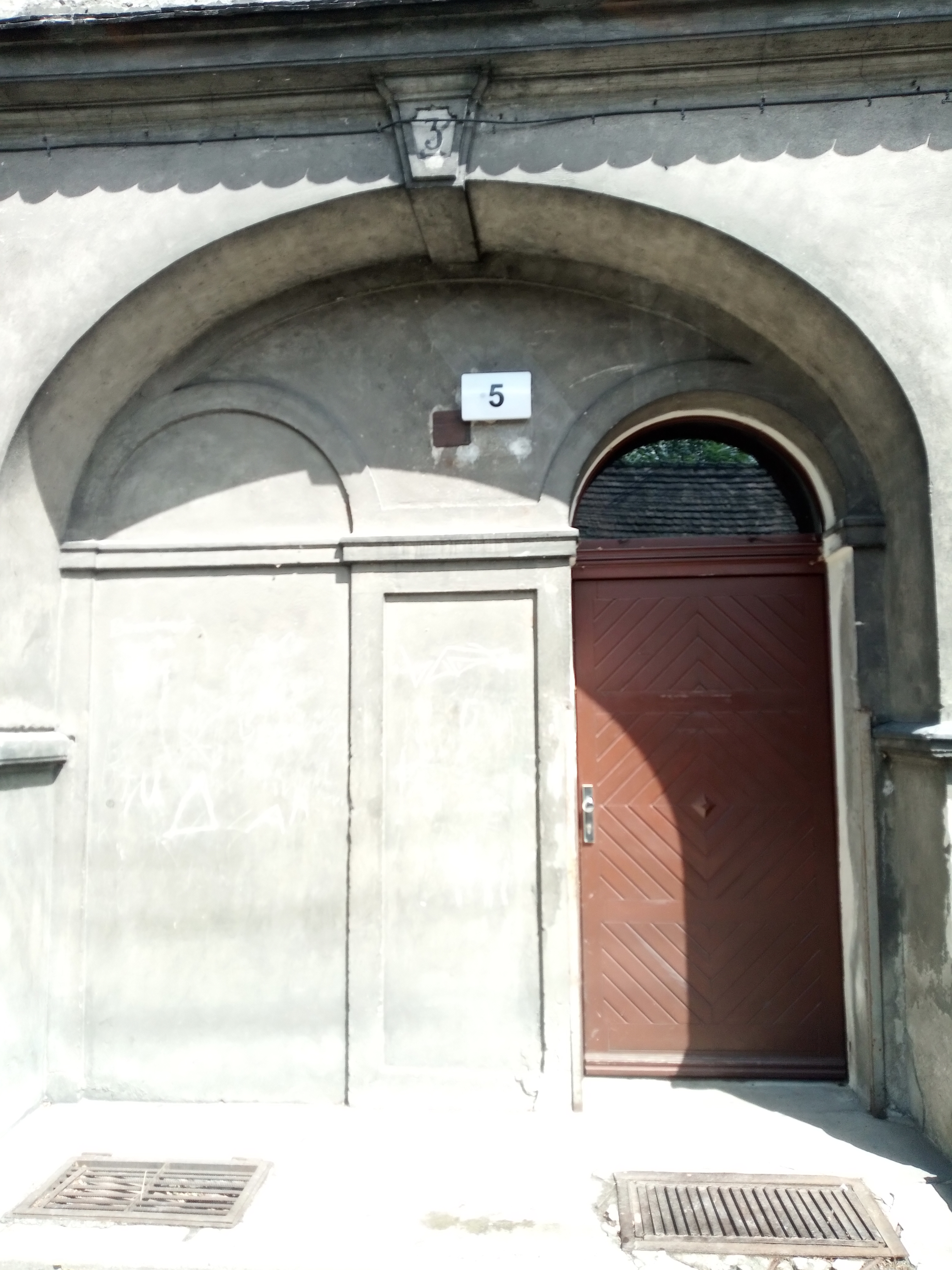
The arched entrance, still bearing the "3" old numbering

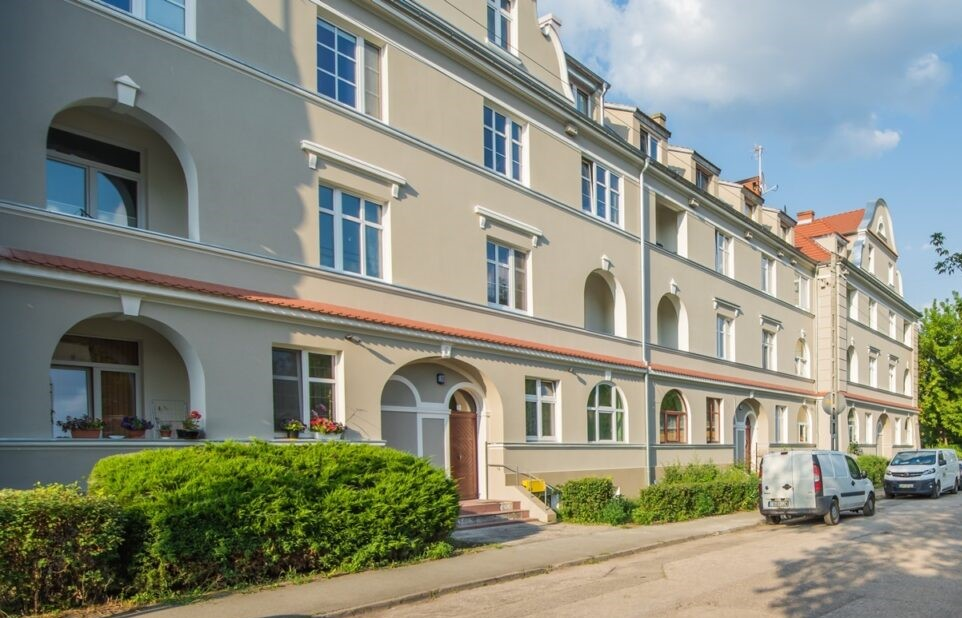
Renovated elevation

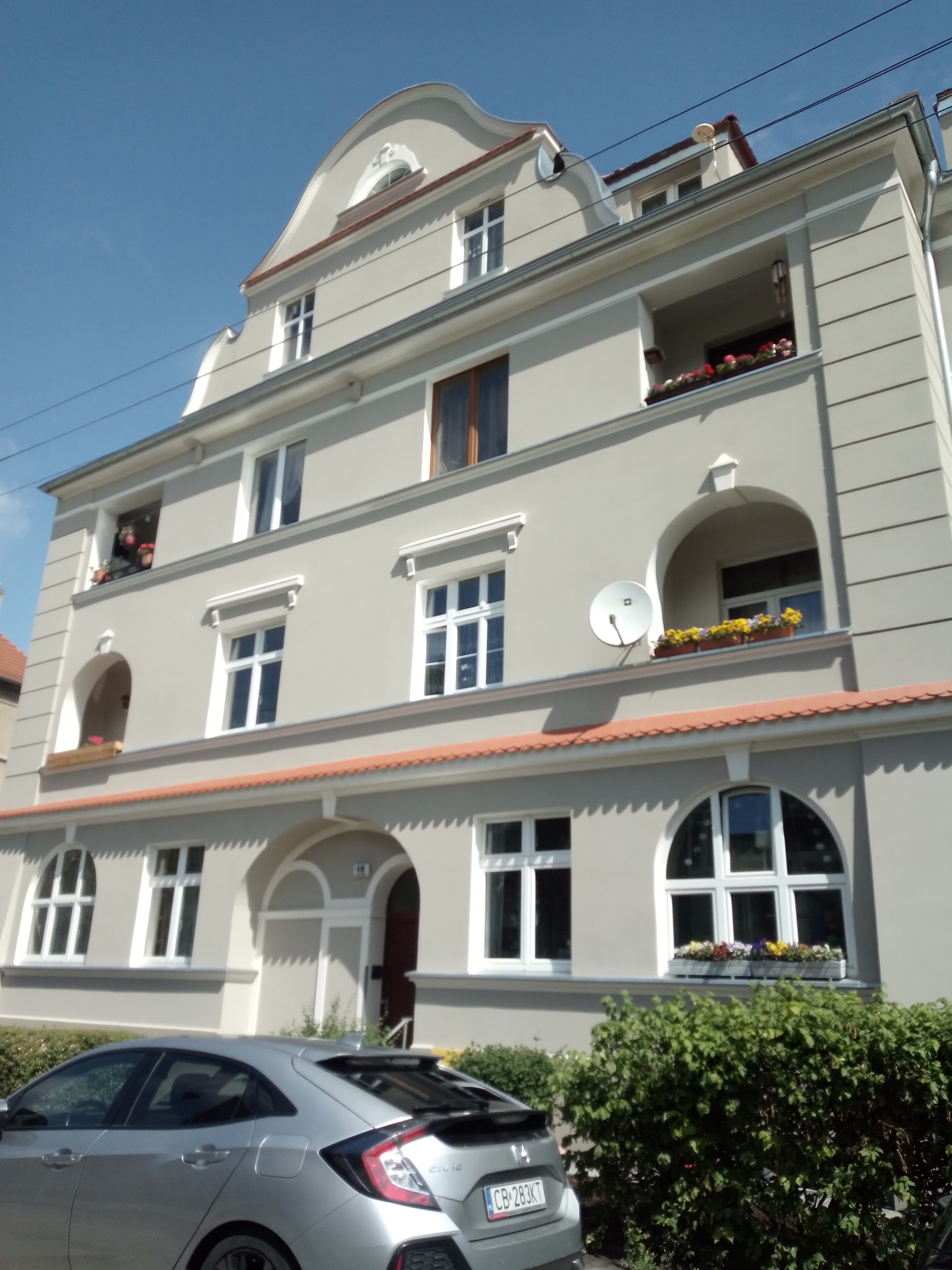
Detail of the renovated facade

=== Tenement at 2 Weyssenhoffa square, 1927 ===
The 2 Weyssenhoffa square was realized as an element of the Sielanka housing estate project. Located on the south-west side of the square, its shape sticks to the gentle arc of the bordering avenue (Ossoliński Alley in Bydgoszcz). It boasts a mix of functionalist style (left side) and eclectic forms (right side) with a loggia and Mansard roof, so as to mirror the adjacent front facade of the eclectic building with Art Nouveau decoration (erected in 1906–1908).

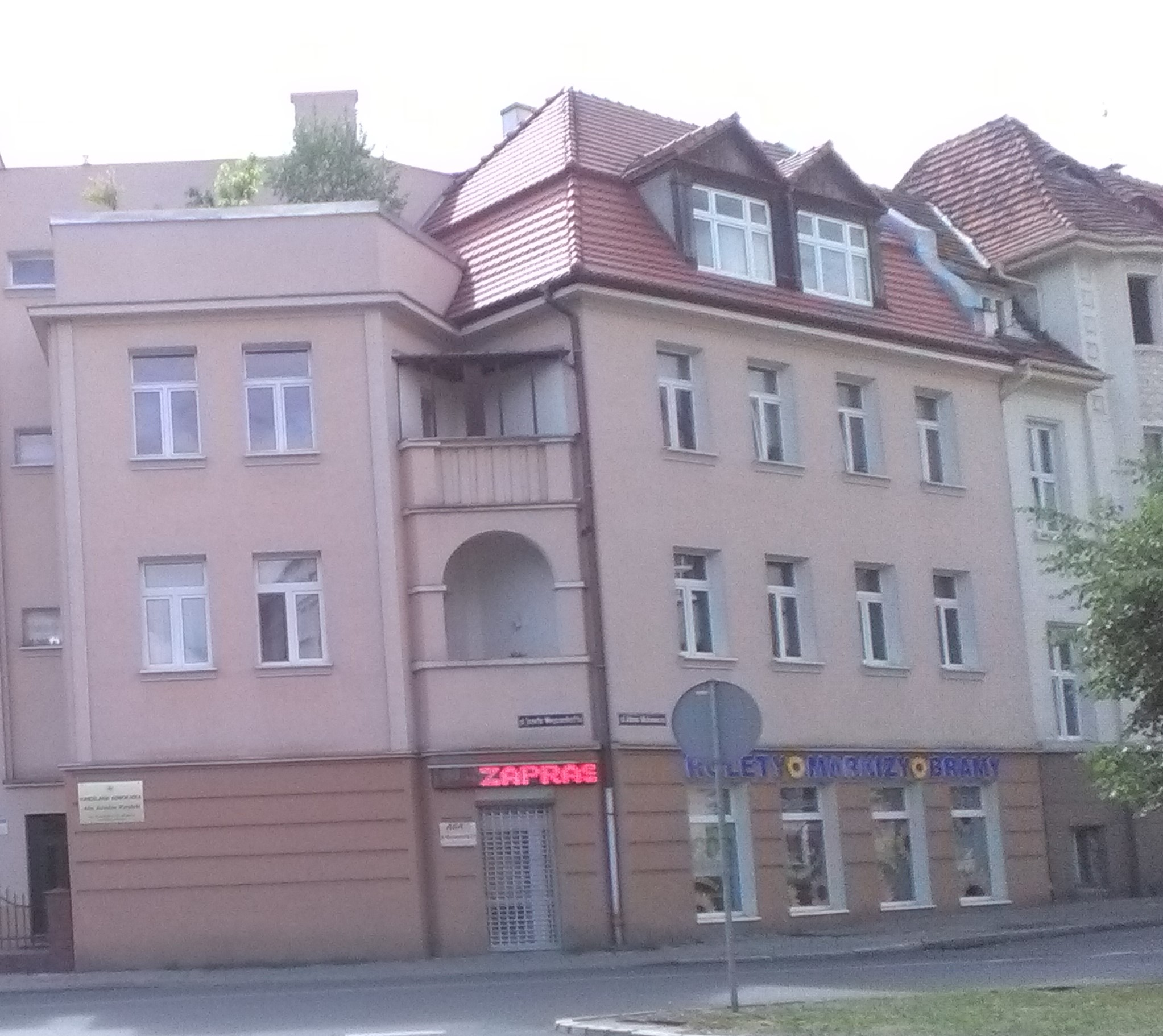
General view of frontages

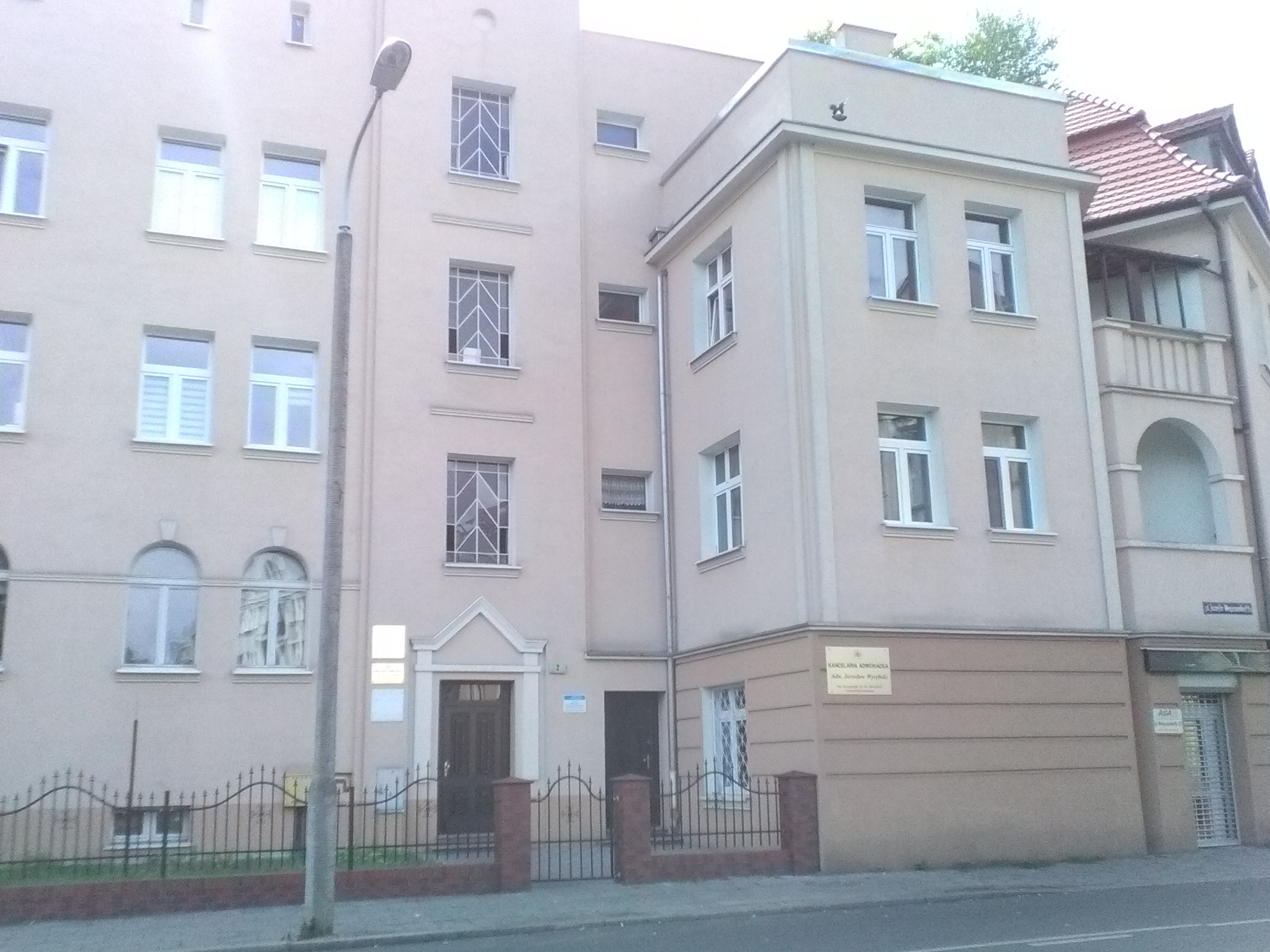
Functionalist facade

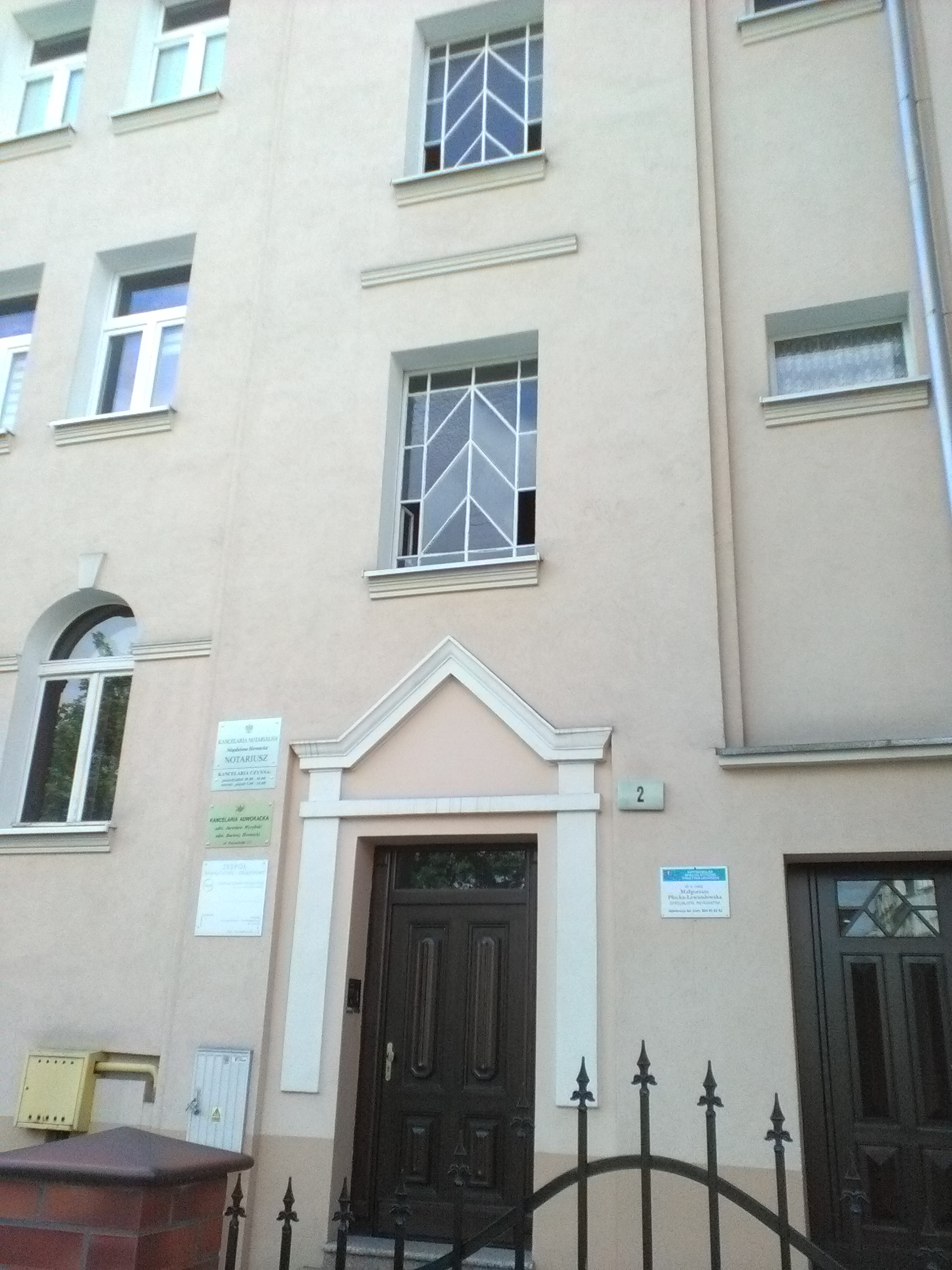
Detail of portal decoration

=== Tenement at 5 Libelta street, 1928–1929 ===
This four-storey residential building at 5 Libelta street displays early modernist style, as one can find also at 51/57 and 107 Jagiellońska street.

In one of the flats lived Adam Grzymała-Siedlecki (1876–1967), a Polish literary and theater critic, playwright, translator, writer and director, who in this flat at Nr.5. He bequeathed to the city of Bydgoszcz all his manuscripts, his private library (more than 300 works) which were moved to the Municipal Library. The institution still tends his last place as a small museum in his memory. On the frontage has been unveiled in 1988 a commemorative plaque.

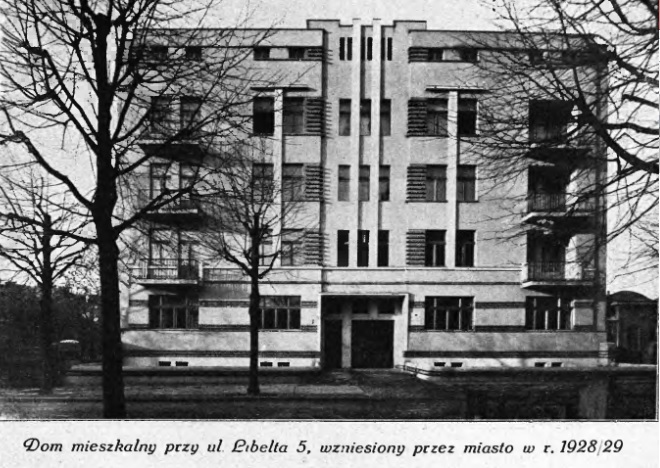
The tenement in 1929

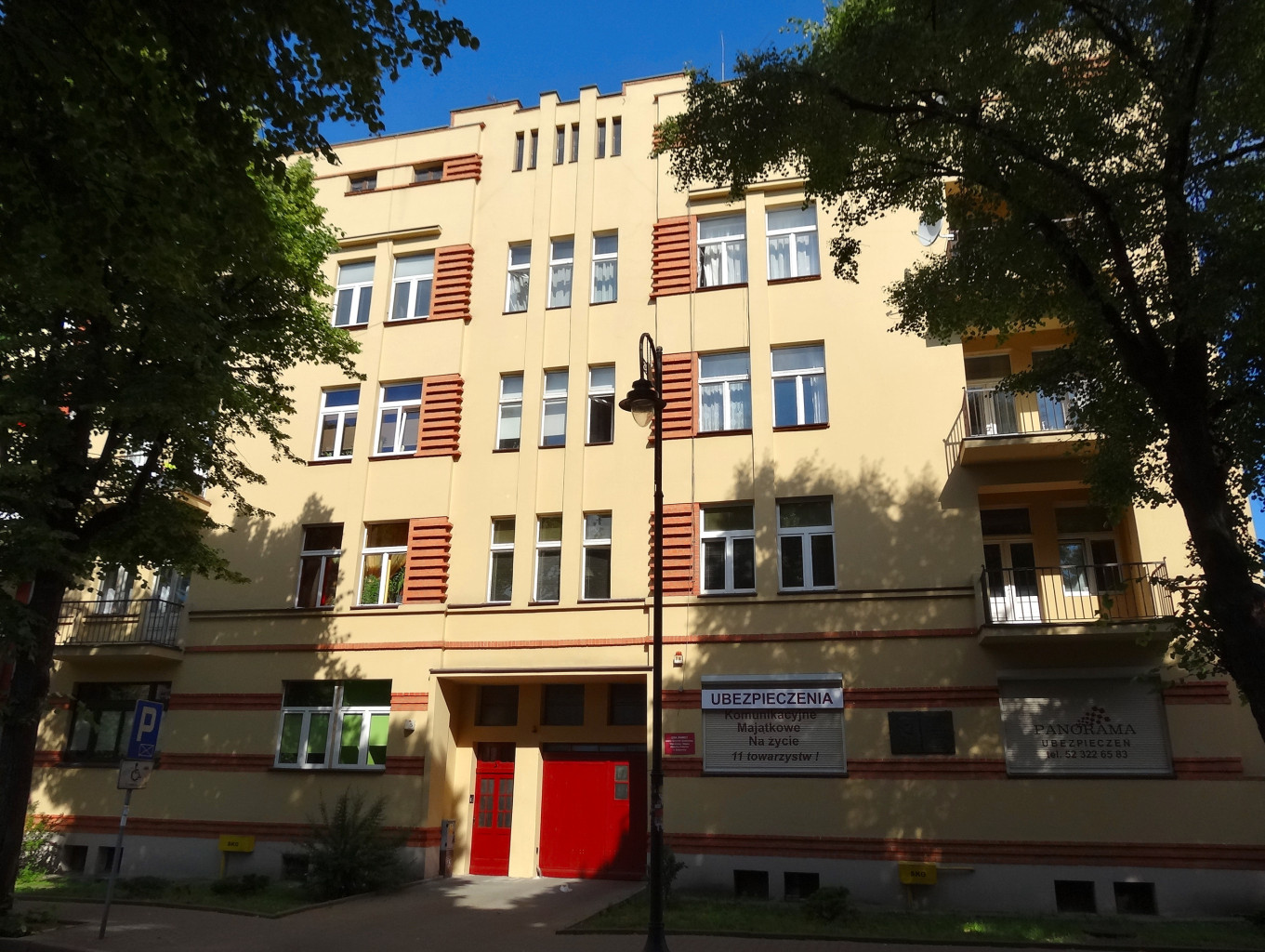
Current front view

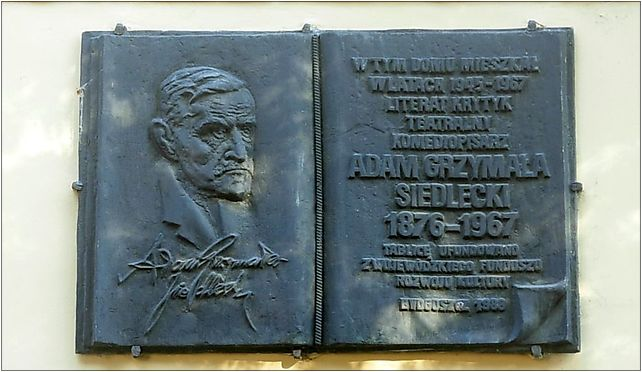
In memoriam plaque

=== Villas at 1 and 1A Asnyka street, 1932 ===
This villa, where Bogdan Raczkowski and his family lived, is designed in the Functionalist style. The house was occupied by Nazi officials after the invasion of Poland in 1939. The neighbouring villa at 1A Asnyka -on a Bogdan's design- was built shortly before the outbreak of World War II.

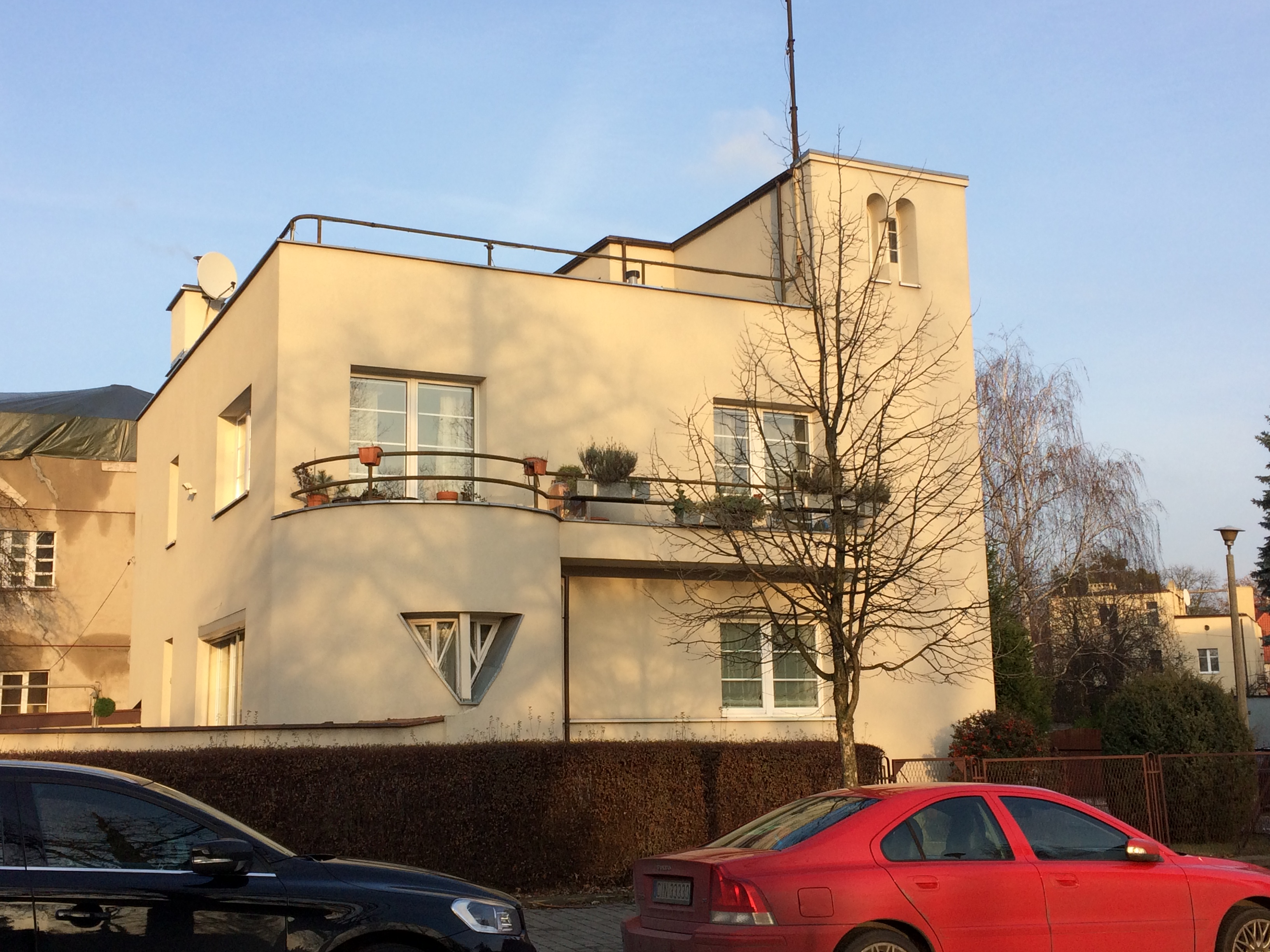
View from Kopernika Street

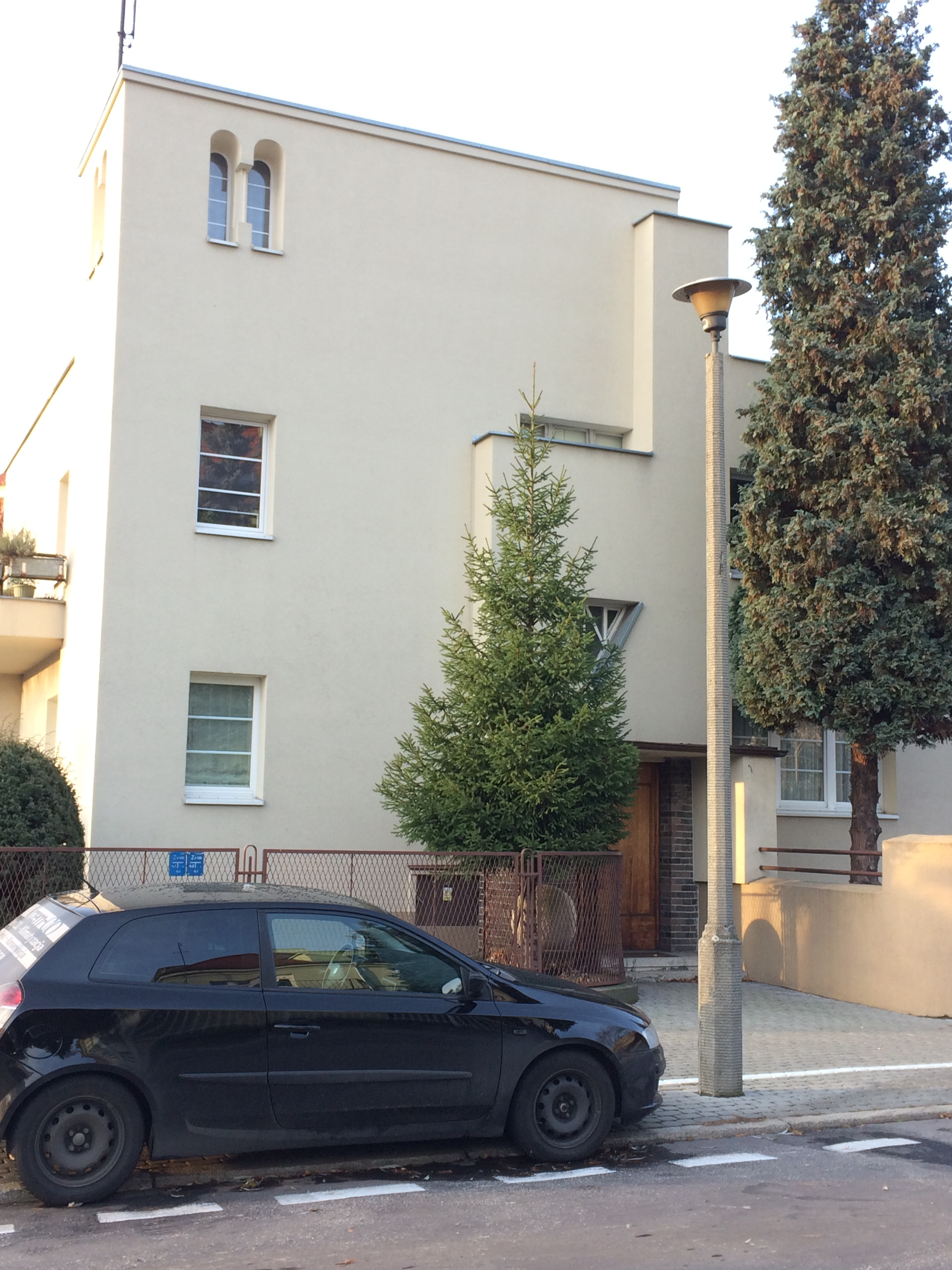
Facade onto Asnyka street

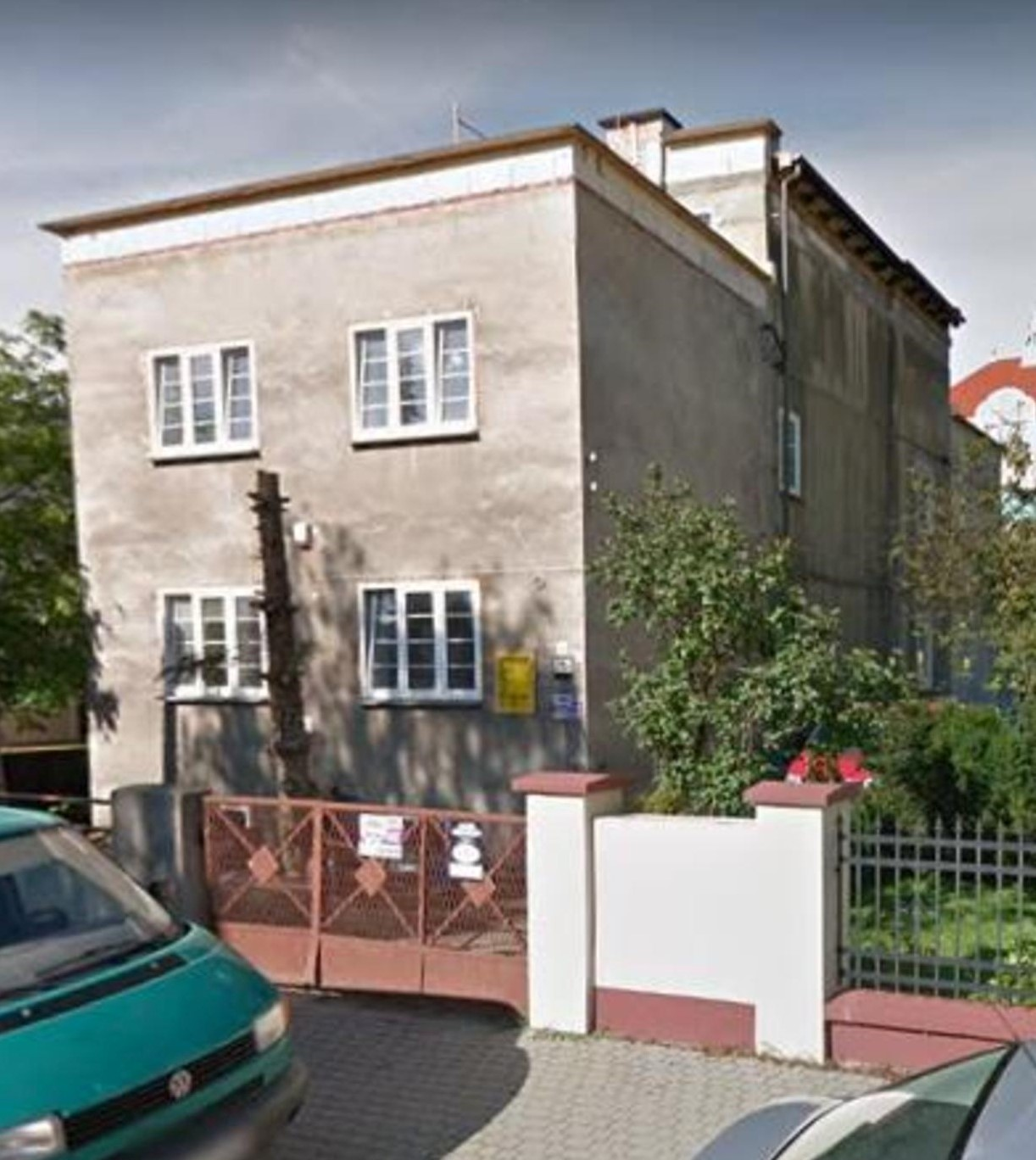
Villa at 1A Asnyka

=== Building at 12 Poniatowskiego street, 1933 ===
The edifice has always been used for educational purposes. It was designed by Raczkowski with engineer Kazimierz Michał Orlicz and built in 1 year, a record at a time of economic crisis, to host Ewaryst Estkowski Public School. The first building stage included among others:

- a basement with three rooms for manual work;
- a ground floor with manager's and teacher's room, plus 3 classrooms;
- a first floor with a doctor's office and 4 classrooms;
- a second floor with a lounge and 4 classrooms;
- a third floor comprising a drawing room and a space for scientific collections.

The outbreak of World War II prevented the implementation of the 2nd stage of building expansion, which caused to realize two separate facilities one for girls and one for boys. After a thorough refurbishing in 2014, the building houses today the Institute of Political Sciences of Bydgoszcz University.

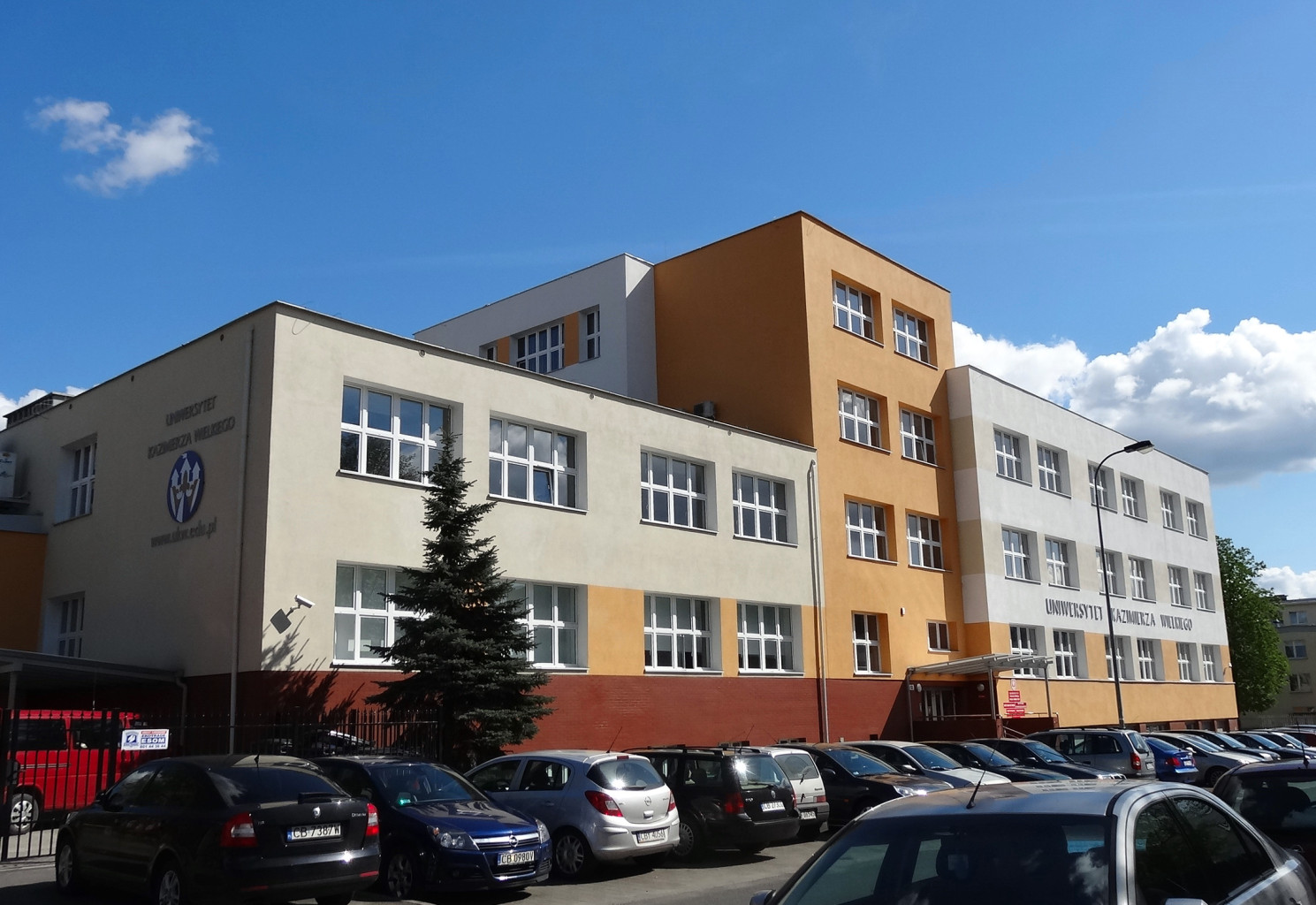
View from Poniatowskiego street

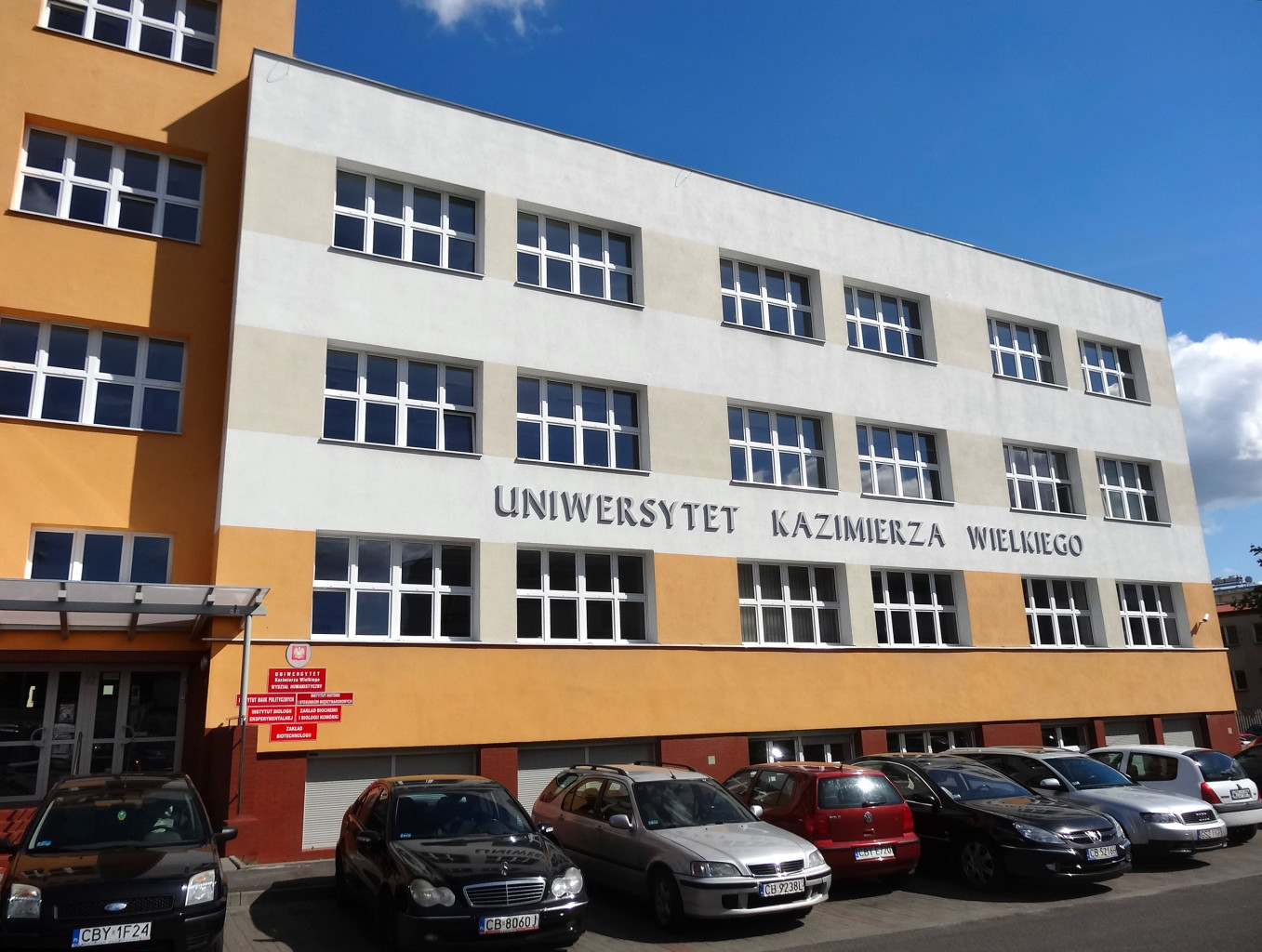
One of the facade onto Poniatowskiego street

=== Antoni Jurasz university hospital, 9 Marii Curie-Skłodowskiej street, 1938 ===
The work began in July 1928, after a blessing of the foundation stone. Raczkowski, together with his colleague Kazimierz Skiciński, contracted engineer Antoni Jaworski to carry out the building. The construction was stopped during winter 1928–1929, then it slowed down and came almost to a stop in 1930, due to city financial problems. Finally, on 13 December 1937, only the west wing and the central part were officially opened. It was the largest hospital built in the interwar period in Poland, with 600 beds, gathering almost all departments under the same roof at a time when pavilions structure organization was more popular in hospital construction.

After Nazi invasion, the facility served as a military field hospital until August 1940. After this date, it became a civilian structure, Dr. Staemmler Krankenhaus hospital, staffed by German practitioners from Gdańsk. The entire hospital project was completed during German occupation.

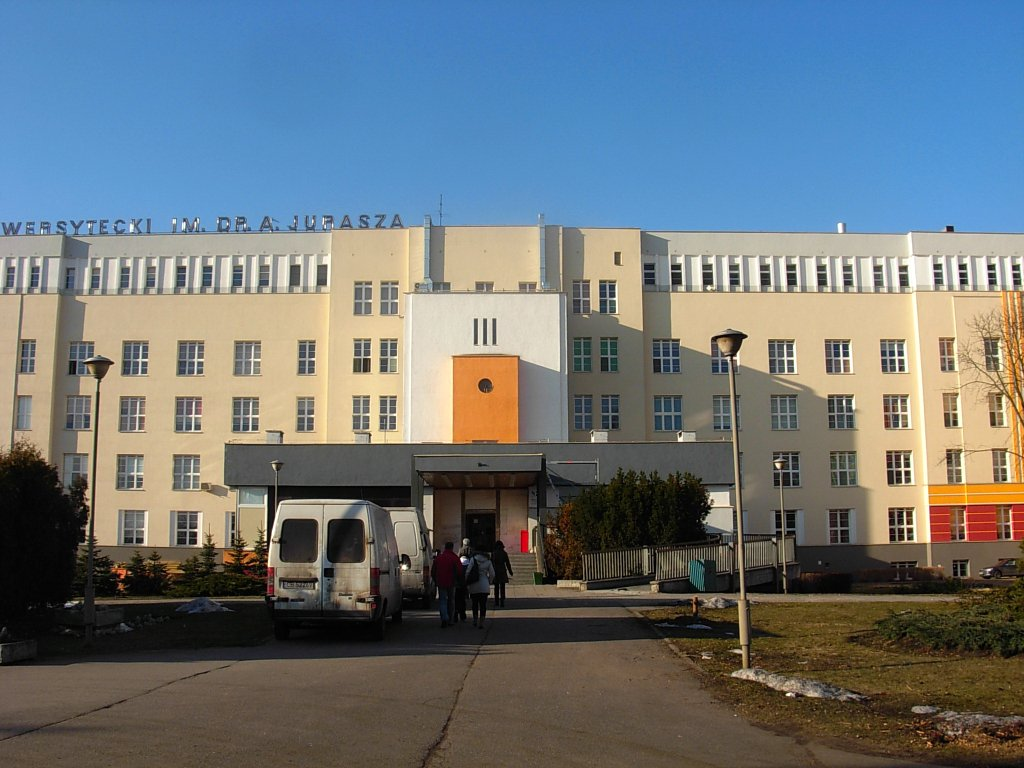
Main entry

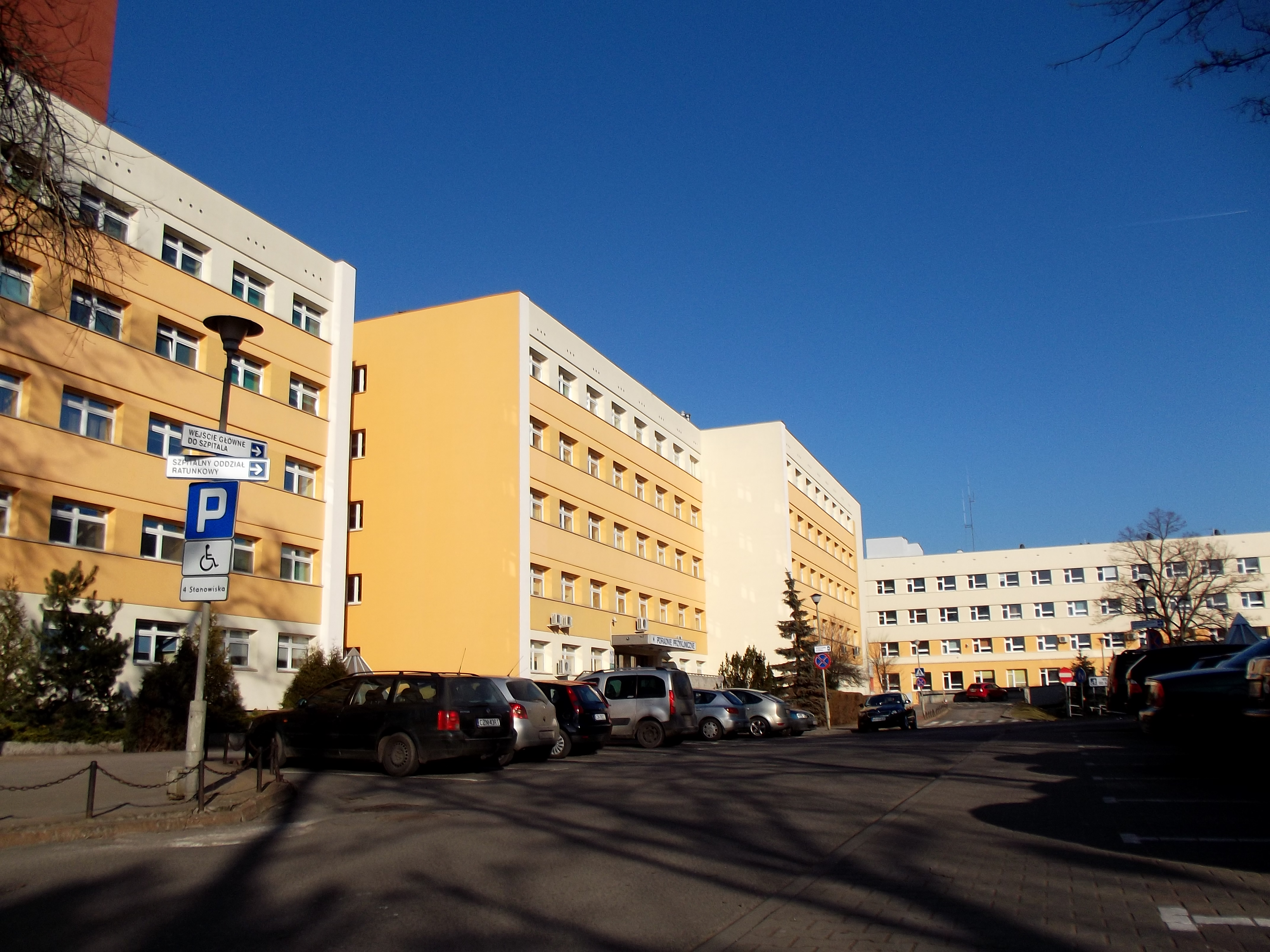
One of the historical buildings

== See also ==
- Bydgoszcz
- Bydgoszcz Architects (1850-1970s)
- List of Polish people
- Polonia Bydgoszcz Stadium
- Jurasza University hospital

== Bibliography ==
- Wysocka, Agnieszka (2004). Bogdan Raczkowski – architekt i urbanista międzywojennej Bydgoszczy. Kronika Bydgoska 26 (in Polish). Bydgoszcz: Towarzystwo Miłosnikow Miasta Bydgoszczy – Bydgoskie Towarzystwo Naukowe. pp. 465–485.
- Błażejewski, Stanisław, Kutta Janusz, Romaniuk Marek (1997). Bydgoski Słownik Biograficzny. Tom IV (in Polish). Bydgoszcz: Kujawsko-Pomorskie Towarzystwo Kulturalne. pp. 84–86. ISBN 83-85327-42-8.
