= Michał Piaszczyński =

Polish Roman Catholic priest and martyr

Blessed Michael Piaszczynski
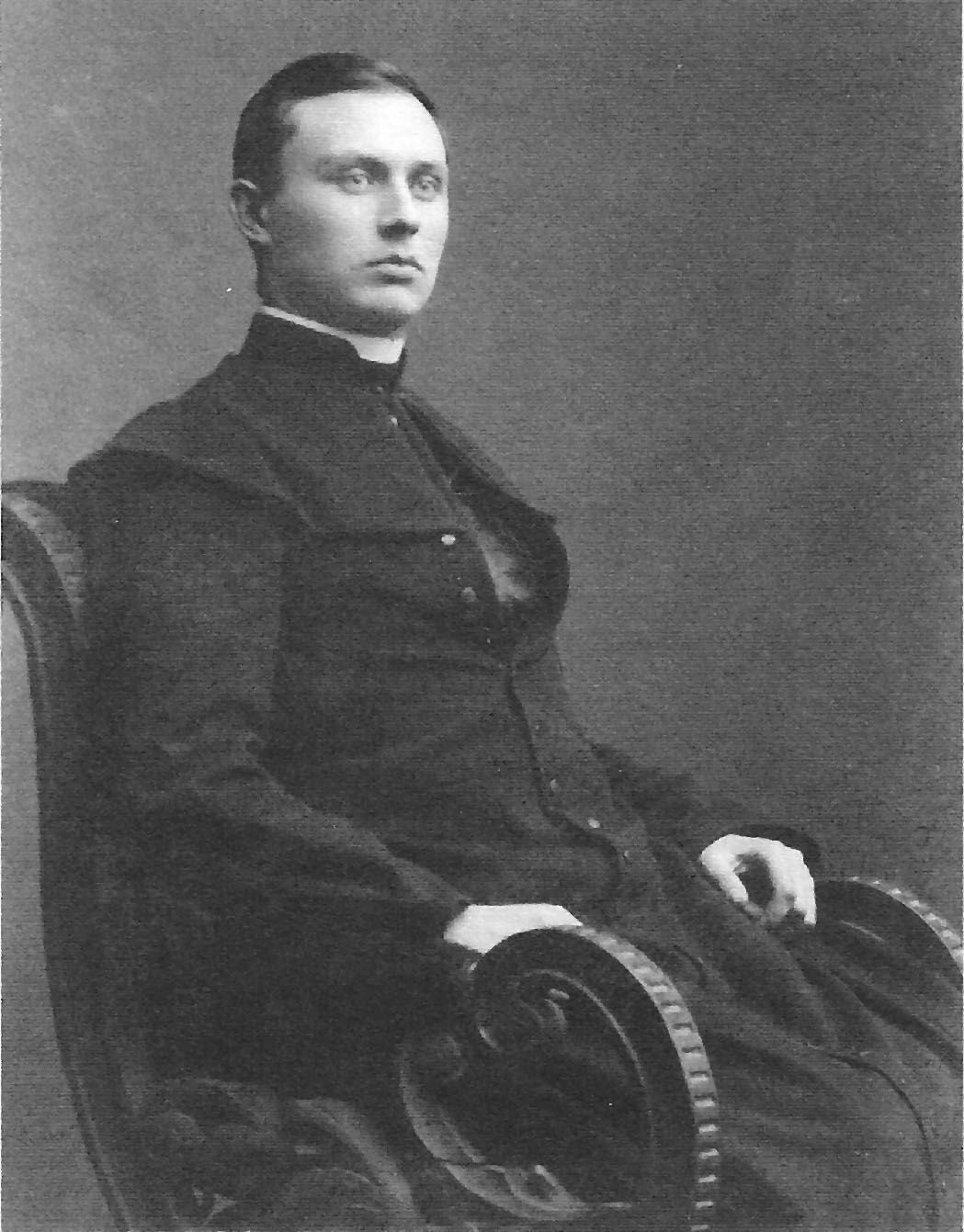

Martyr
- Born: 1 November 1885; Łomża, Poland
- Died: 18 December 1940 (aged 55); Sachsenhausen concentration camp
- Beatified: 13 June 1999 by Pope John Paul II
- Feast: 20 December, 12 June (with other martyrs of Auschwitz and Sachsenhausen)

Michael Piaszczynski (1 November 1885 – 18 December 1940) was a Polish Catholic priest who was arrested by the Nazis and killed at Sachsenhausen concentration camp. As a martyr he was beatified by Pope John Paul II on 13 June 1999.

== Life ==
Michael Piaszczynski was born in Łomża, Poland, the son of Ferdynand and Anna Zientara. He was ordained to the priesthood on 13 June 1911. He was parish priest in Mikaszówka, Poland for a year before moving to Fribourg to earn a doctorate in philosophy. Father Piaszczynski served as a chaplain to a colony of Polish miners in France. From 1919 to 1935, he served at the Theological Seminary in the Diocese of Łomża and as a faculty member of the Piotr Skarga Secondary School in Łomża.

== Arrest and Death ==
In September 1939, Father Piaszczynski became director of St. Casimir Secondary School in Sejnach. He was arrested on 7 April 1940 during the Nazi persecution of the Catholic Church in Poland and was moved to Sachsenhausen on 3 May 1940. During his detention, Father Piaszczynski was in the habit of giving up his own scarce ration of bread to elderly Jewish inmates. One of them said to him "You, Catholics, believe that the living Christ is to be found in the bread within your churches; I believe that Christ lives in this very bread, which He made you share with me”. Piaszczynski died of physical exhaustion and related illness on 18 December 1940.

== Beatification ==
On 13 June 1999, Pope John Paul II beatified Michael Piaszczynski along with the 108 Martyrs of World War II.

== See also ==
- Polish Righteous Among the Nations
- The Holocaust in Poland
- World War II casualties of Poland
