= Kurzawa =

Kurzawa (Polish pronunciation: [kuˈʐava]) is a Polish surname. It may refer to:

- Józef Kurzawa (1910–1940), Polish Roman Catholic priest
- Layvin Kurzawa (born 1992), French footballer
- Rafał Kurzawa (born 1993), Polish footballer
