= 108 Martyrs of World War II =

Catholic martyrs in Poland during WWII

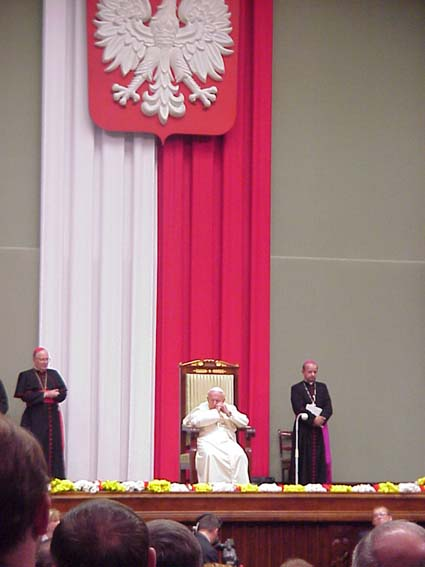
- John Paul II during his visit to Poland in June 1999, Warsaw
- Born: of Polish nationality
- Died: in 1939–1945
- Martyred by: German Nazis
- Venerated in: Catholic Church
- Beatified: 13 June 1999, Warsaw, Poland, by Pope John Paul II
- Feast: 12 June
- Notable martyrs: Antoni Julian Nowowiejski; Jan Franciszek Czartoryski; Hilary Paweł Januszewski; Józef Cebula

The 108 Martyrs of World War II, known also as the 108 Blessed Polish Martyrs (Polish: 108 błogosławionych męczenników), were Catholics from Poland killed during World War II by German Nazis. Their liturgical feast day is 12 June. The 108 were beatified on 13 June 1999 by Pope John Paul II in Warsaw. The group comprises 3 bishops, 79 priests, 7 male religious, 8 female religious, and 11 lay people. There are two parishes named for the martyrs, in Powiercie in Koło County, and in Malbork.

== List of martyrs ==
=== Bishops ===
1. Antoni Julian Nowowiejski (1858–1941 KL Soldau), bishop
2. Leon Wetmański (1886–1941 KL Soldau), bishop
3. Władysław Goral (1898–1945 KL Sachsenhausen), bishop

=== Priests ===
1. Adam Bargielski, priest from Myszyniec (1903–1942 KZ Dachau)
2. Aleksy Sobaszek, priest (1895–1942 KL Dachau)
3. Alfons Maria Mazurek, Carmelite friar, prior, priest (1891–1944, shot by the Gestapo)
4. Alojzy Liguda, Society of the Divine Word, priest (1898–1942 KL Dachau)
5. Anastazy Jakub Pankiewicz, Franciscan friar, priest (1882–1942 KL Dachau)
6. Anicet Kopliński, Capuchin friar, priest in Warsaw (1875–1941)
7. Antoni Beszta-Borowski, priest, dean of Bielsk Podlaski (1880–1943, shot near Bielsk Podlaski)
8. Antoni Leszczewicz, Marian Father, priest (1890–1943, burnt to death in Rosica, Belarus)
9. Antoni Rewera, priest, dean of the Cathedral Chapter in Sandomierz (1869–1942 KL Dachau)
10. Antoni Świadek, priest from Bydgoszcz (1909–1945 KL Dachau)
11. Antoni Zawistowski, priest (1882–1942 KL Dachau)
12. Bolesław Strzelecki, priest (1896–1941 KL Auschwitz)
13. Bronisław Komorowski, priest (1889–22 March 1940 KL Stutthof)
14. Dominik Jędrzejewski, priest (1886–1942 KL Dachau)
15. Edward Detkens, priest (1885–1942 KL Dachau)
16. Edward Grzymała, priest (1906–1942 KL Dachau)
17. Emil Szramek, priest (1887–1942 KL Dachau)
18. Fidelis Chojnacki, Capuchin friar, priest (1906–1942, KL Dachau)
19. Florian Stępniak, Capuchin friar, priest (1912–1942 KL Dachau)
20. Franciszek Dachtera, priest (1910–23 August 1942 KL Dachau)
21. Franciszek Drzewiecki, Orionine Father, priest (1908–1942 KL Dachau); from Zduny, he was condemned to heavy work in the plantation of Dachau. While he was bending over tilling the soil, he adored the consecrated hosts kept in a small box in front of him. While he was going to the gas chamber, he encouraged his companions, saying "We offer our life for God, for the Church and for our Country".
22. Franciszek Rogaczewski, priest from Gdańsk (1892–1940, shot in Stutthof or in Piaśnica, Pomerania)
23. Franciszek Rosłaniec, priest (1889–1942 KL Dachau)
24. Henryk Hlebowicz, priest (1904–1941, shot at Borisov in Belarus)
25. Henryk Kaczorowski, priest from Włocławek (1888–1942)
26. Henryk Krzysztofik, religious priest (1908–1942 KL Dachau)
27. Hilary Paweł Januszewski, religious priest (1907–1945 KL Dachau)
28. Jan Antonin Bajewski, Conventual Franciscan friar, priest (1915–1941 KL Auschwitz); of Niepokalanow. These were the closest collaborators of St Maximilian Kolbe in the fight for God's cause and together suffered and helped each other spiritually in their offering their lives at Auschwitz
29. Jan Franciszek Czartoryski, Dominican friar, priest (1897–1944)
30. Jan Nepomucen Chrzan, priest (1885–1942 KL Dachau)
31. Jerzy Kaszyra, Marian Father, priest (1910–1943, burnt to death in Rosica, Belarus)
32. Józef Achilles Puchała, Franciscan friar, priest (1911–1943, killed near Iwieniec, Belarus)
33. Józef Cebula, Missionary Oblate, priest (23 March 1902 – 9 May 1941 KL Mauthausen)
34. Józef Czempiel, priest (1883–1942 KL Mauthausen)
35. Józef Innocenty Guz, Franciscan friar, priest (1890–1940 KL Sachsenhausen)
36. Józef Jankowski, Pallotine, priest (1910 born in Czyczkowy near Brusy, Kashubia (died 16 October 1941 in KL Auschwitz beaten by a kapo)
37. Józef Kowalski, Salesian, priest (1911–1942)
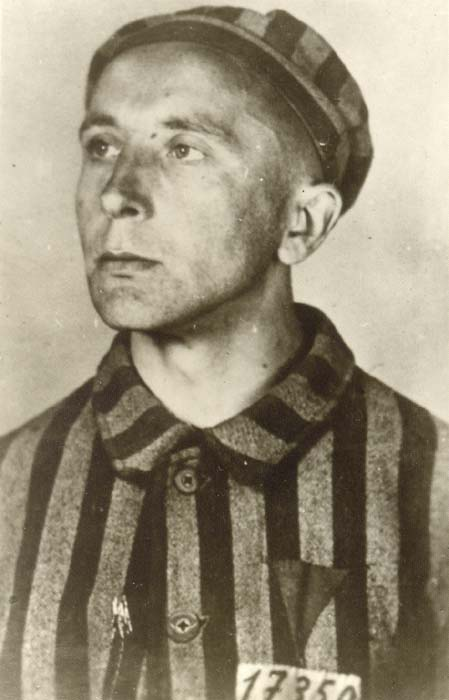
  Józef Kowalski, priest beaten to death on 3 July 1942 in the KL Auschwitz concentration camp
38. Józef Kurzawa, priest (1910–1940)
39. Józef Kut, priest (1905–1942 KL Dachau)
40. Józef Pawłowski, priest (1890–9 January 1942 KL Dachau)
41. Józef Stanek, Pallottine, priest (1916–23 September 1944, murdered in Warsaw)
42. Józef Straszewski, priest (1885–1942 KL Dachau)
43. Karol Herman Stępień, Franciscan friar, priest (1910–1943, killed near Iwieniec, Belarus)
44. Kazimierz Gostyński, priest (1884–1942 KL Dachau)
45. Kazimierz Grelewski, priest (1907–1942 KL Dachau)
46. Kazimierz Sykulski, priest (1882–1942 KL Auschwitz)
47. Krystyn Gondek, Franciscan friar, priest (1909–1942 KL Dachau)
48. Leon Nowakowski, priest (1913–1939)
49. Ludwik Mzyk, Society of the Divine Word, priest (1905–1940)
50. Ludwik Pius Bartosik, Conventual Franciscan friar, priest (1909–1941 KL Auschwitz); of Niepokalanow. These were the closest collaborators of St Maximilian Kolbe in the fight for God's cause and together suffered and helped each other spiritually in their offering their lives at Auschwitz
51. Ludwik Roch Gietyngier, priest from Częstochowa (1904–1941 KL Dachau)
52. Maksymilian Binkiewicz, priest (1913–24 July 1942, beaten, died in KL Dachau)
53. Marian Gorecki, priest (1903–22 March 1940 KL Stutthof)
54. Marian Konopiński, Capuchin friar, priest (1907–1 January 1943 KL Dachau)
55. Marian Skrzypczak, priest (1909–1939 shot in Plonkowo)
56. Michał Oziębłowski, priest (1900–1942 KL Dachau)
57. Michał Piaszczyński, priest (1885–1940 KL Sachsenhausen)
58. Michał Woźniak, priest (1875–1942 KL Dachau)
59. Mieczysław Bohatkiewicz, priest (1904–4 March 1942, shot in Berezwecz)
60. Narcyz Putz, priest (1877–1942 KL Dachau)
61. Narcyz Turchan, priest (1879–1942 KL Dachau)
62. Piotr Edward Dankowski, priest (1908–3 April 1942 KL Auschwitz)
63. Roman Archutowski, priest (1882–1943 KL Majdanek)
64. Roman Sitko, priest (1880–1942 KL Auschwitz)
65. Stanisław Kubista, Society of the Divine Word, priest (1898–1940 KL Sachsenhausen)
66. Stanisław Kubski, priest (1876–1942, prisoner in KL Dachau, killed in Hartheim near Linz)
67. Stanisław Mysakowski, priest (1896–1942 KL Dachau)
68. Stanisław Pyrtek, priest (1913–4 March 1942, shot in Berezwecz)
69. Stefan Grelewski, priest (1899–1941 KL Dachau)
70. Wincenty Matuszewski, priest (1869–1940)
71. Władysław Błądziński, Michaelite, priest (1908–1944, KL Gross-Rosen)
72. Władysław Demski, priest (1884–28 May 1940, KL Sachsenhausen)
73. Władysław Maćkowiak, priest (1910–4 March 1942 shot in Berezwecz)
74. Władysław Mączkowski, priest (1911–20 August 1942 KL Dachau)
75. Władysław Miegoń, priest, commander lieutenant (1892–1942 KL Dachau)
76. Włodzimierz Laskowski, priest (1886–1940 KL Gusen)
77. Wojciech Nierychlewski, religious, priest (1903–1942, KL Auschwitz)
78. Zygmunt Pisarski, priest (1902–1943)
79. Zygmunt Sajna, priest (1897–1940, shot at Palmiry, near Warsaw)

=== Religious brothers ===
1. Brunon Zembol, friar (1905–1942 KL Dachau)
2. Grzegorz Bolesław Frąckowiak, Society of the Divine Word friar (1911–1943, guillotined in Dresden)
3. Józef Zapłata, friar (1904–1945 KL Dachau)
4. Marcin Oprządek, friar (1884–1942 KL Dachau)
5. Piotr Bonifacy Żukowski, friar (1913–1942 KL Auschwitz)
6. Stanisław Tymoteusz Trojanowski, friar (1908–1942 KL Auschwitz)
7. Symforian Ducki, friar (1888–1942 KL Auschwitz)

=== Nuns and religious sisters ===
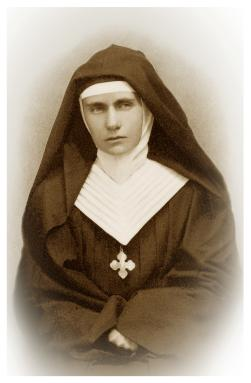
Alicja Jadwiga Kotowska, a nun killed in 1939 in the mass murders in Piaśnica

1. Alicja Maria Jadwiga Kotowska, sister, based on eye-witness reports comforted and huddled with Jewish children before she and the children were executed (1899–1939, executed at Piaśnica, Pomerania)
2. Ewa Noiszewska, sister (1885–1942, executed at Góra Pietrelewicka near Slonim, Belarus)
3. Julia Rodzińska, Dominican sister (1899–20 February 1945, KL Stutthof); she died having contracted typhoid serving the Jewish women prisoners in a hut for which she had volunteered.
4. Katarzyna Celestyna Faron (1913–1944, KL Auschwitz); had offered her life for the conversion of an Old Catholic bishop Władysław Faron (no relation). She was arrested by the Gestapo and condemned to Auschwitz camp. She put up heroically with all the abuses of the camp and died on Easter Sunday 1944. The bishop later returned to the Catholic Church.
5. Maria Antonina Kratochwil, SSND nun (1881–1942) died as a result of the torture she endured while imprisoned in Stanisławów.
6. Maria Klemensa Staszewska (1890–1943 KL Auschwitz)
7. Marta Wołowska (1879–1942, executed at Góra Pietrelewicka near Slonim, Belarus)
8. Mieczysława Kowalska, sister (1902–1941, Soldau concentration camp in Działdowo)

=== Roman Catholic laity ===
1. Bronisław Kostkowski, alumnus (1915–1942 KL Dachau)
2. Czesław Jóźwiak (1919–1942, guillotined in a prison in Dresden)
3. Edward Kaźmierski (1919–1942, guillotined in a prison in Dresden)
4. Edward Klinik (1919–1942, guillotined in a prison in Dresden)
5. Franciszek Kęsy (1920–1942, guillotined in a prison in Dresden)
6. Franciszek Stryjas (1882–31 July 1944, Kalisz prison)
7. Jarogniew Wojciechowski (1922–1942, guillotined in a prison in Dresden)
8. Marianna Biernacka (1888–13 July 1943), executed instead of her pregnant daughter-in-law Anna, offered her life for her and her unborn grandchild.
9. Natalia Tułasiewicz (1906–31 March 1945, died in KL Ravensbrück)
10. Stanisław Starowieyski (1895–1941 in KL Dachau)
11. Tadeusz Dulny, alumnus (1914–1942 KL Dachau)

== See also ==
- Jewish ghettos in German-occupied Poland
- List of Nazi-German concentration camps
- Nazi persecution of the Catholic Church in Poland
- Polish Righteous Among the Nations
- The Holocaust in Poland
- Janek Wiśniewski, a fictional name to the real Polish person
- World War II casualties of Poland
- Monument to fallen Shipyard Workers
- Polish 1970 protests
