= Grzegorz Bolesław Frąckowiak =

Polish Roman Catholic martyr

Blessed Grzegorz Bolesław Frąckowiak SVD

Martyr
- Born: July 18, 1911; Lowencice
- Died: May 5, 1943 (aged 31); Dresden
- Venerated in: Roman Catholic Church
- Beatified: 13 June 1999, Poland by Pope John Paul II
- Feast: June 12

Grzegorz (Gregory) Bolesław Frąckowiak (July 18, 1911 – May 5, 1943) was a Society of the Divine Word (SVD) martyr. He was beatified by Pope John Paul II on 13 June 1999 as one of the 108 Polish Martyrs of World War II.

== Life ==
Bolesław Frąckowiak was born one of twelve children of a poor farm family in Łowęcice, Poland. He was an altar boy in his local parish. Because he could not afford secondary education and later seminary schooling, in 1927 he decided to become a religious brother with the Society of the Divine Word missionaries. He was sent to the novitiate in Górna Grupa and there met fellow martyrs Aloysius Liguda and Stanisław Kubista. He continued his studies and taught in the novitiate. After a year of postulancy, in 1930, he took his temporary vows and the religious name "Gregory", and received the habit. He became the principal bookbinder of the novitiate. He also wrote the daily spiritual exercises that would be undertaken by his fellow aspiring novitiates, and even took care of the food preparations. In 1938, he was ordained as a friar.

During World War II, the Gestapo set up an internment camp for all priests in the region. The religious brothers were eventually released, but Bro. Grzegorz remained to assist the internees. In February 1940, they were transported to a concentration camp, and Frąckowiak went home and assisted the parish priest until that priest too was arrested. Aware of his bookbinding experience, German officials sent him to work at a printing press in Jarocin. There, he and others started an underground newspaper "For you, Poland" to boost people's morale. On the advice of a priest of his congregation, Frąckowiak then distanced himself from the publication.

About a year later, the Nazis discovered the secret group and hunted them down. Although he had had no recent involvement in the publication, Frąckowiak was concerned for the families of those arrested, and directed his fellow prisoners to assign all responsibility to him. He was tortured and imprisoned in Fort VII, and was then transferred to Dresden in 1943, where he was beheaded by guillotine on May 5, 1943, after secretly writing a letter to his family. He was thrown in an unmarked grave.

== Sources ==
- "SVD-Curia :: History&Tradition :: SVD Martyrs". svdcuria.org. Archived from the original on 2021-10-30.
