= Anastazy Jakub Pankiewicz =

Polish Roman Catholic Franciscan friar, priest and martyr

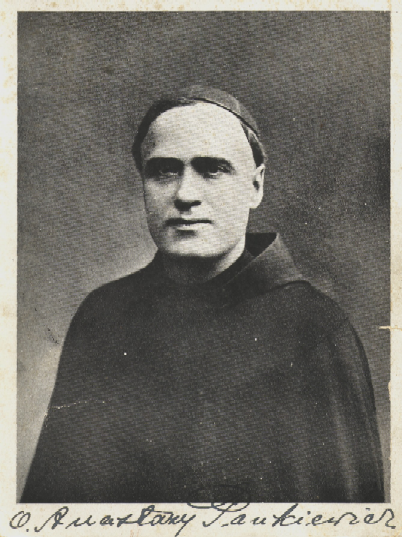

Anastazy Jakub Pankiewicz (July 9, 1882 – May 20, 1942) was a Polish Roman Catholic Franciscan friar and priest. He was arrested on October 10, 1941 and taken to the Nazi concentration camp at Dachau, where he died. He is one of the 108 Martyrs of World War II who were beatified by Pope John Paul II in 1999.

== See also ==
- List of Nazi-German concentration camps
- The Holocaust in Poland
- World War II casualties of Poland
