= Anicet Kopliński =

Polish Roman Catholic Capuchin friar, priest, and martyr

Anicet Adalbert Kopliński (né Koplin; 30 July 1875 – 16 October 1941) was a Polish Capuchin friar of German descent and priest in Warsaw. He was imprisoned in the Nazi concentration camp at Auschwitz, where he died.

He is one of the 108 Martyrs of World War II who were beatified by Pope John Paul II in 1999.

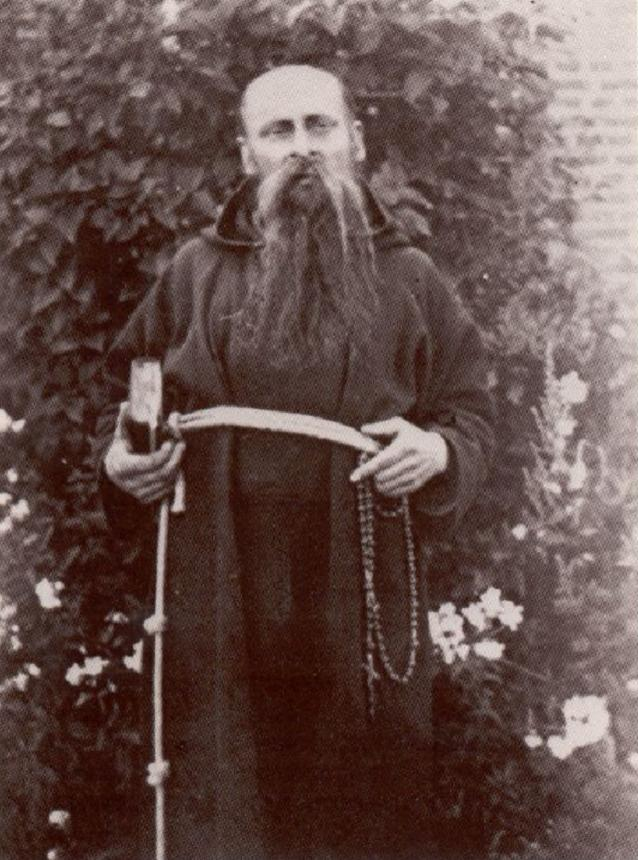
Anicet Kopliński

== Life ==
Antoni Adalberta Koplin was born in Debrzno, (then part of Prussia), to a Catholic father and a Lutheran mother, and was the second of 12 children. As a child, he was ill, and decided that if he lived, he would become a Capuchin and did so after finishing high school in 1893. He was ordained a priest in 1900.

During WWI, he was a chaplain to German prisons, and to prisoners of war. He also wrote poetry.

In 1918 he moved to Warsaw and in 1930 he became a Polish citizen, changing his name to a Polish spelling. In Warsaw, he worked with poor people, helping with food, clothes and education.

He and 20 other Capuchins at the Warsaw monastery were arrested in June 1941. The monks were originally held at Pawiak Prison but were moved to Auschwitz in September 1941. He and 11 monks died in Auschwitz within the following 18 months.

== See also ==
- List of Nazi-German concentration camps
- The Holocaust in Poland
- World War II casualties of Poland
