= Emil Szramek =

Polish Roman Catholic priest and martyr

Blessed Emil Michael Schramek
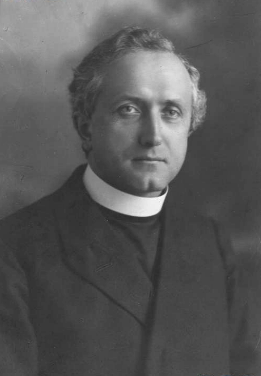

Priest and Martyr
- Born: 29 September 1887; Tworków, Poland
- Died: 13 January 1942 (aged 54); Dachau concentration camp, Dachau, Germany
- Venerated in: Catholic Church
- Beatified: 13 June 1999, Warsaw, Poland by Pope John Paul II
- Feast: 13 January
- Attributes: Martyr's palm Rosary
- Patronage: Tworkow, Poland

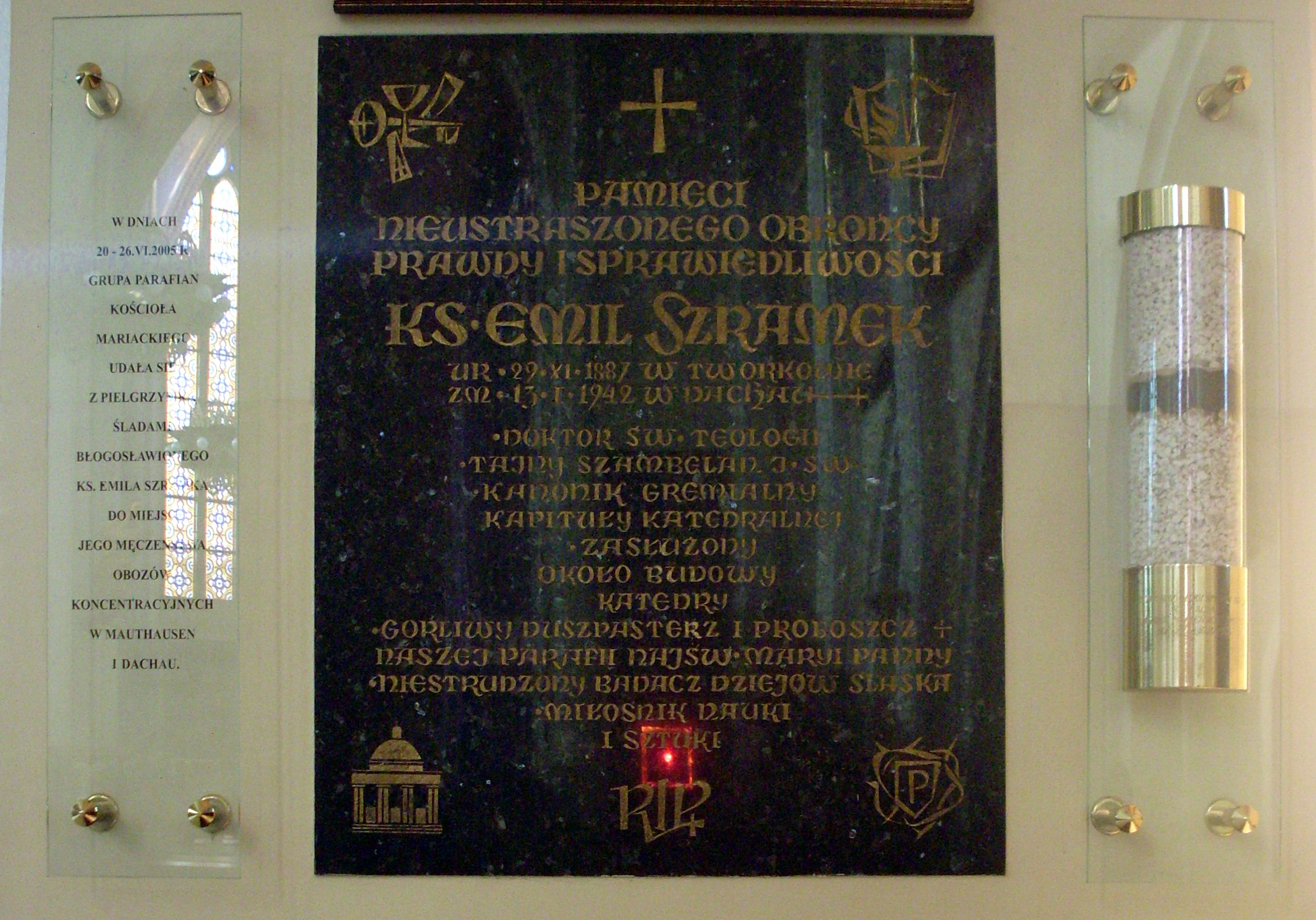
Commemorative plaque in the Church of St. Mary in Katowice

Emil Szramek (29 September 1887 – 13 January 1942) was a Polish and Roman Catholic priest. He graduated from the University of Wrocław. He died in a Nazi concentration camp at Dachau. He is one of the 108 Martyrs of World War II who were beatified in 1999 by Pope John Paul II.

== Orders and decorations ==
- Golden Cross of Merit (20 December 1927)
- Silver Academic Laurel (5 November 1935)

== See also ==
- List of Nazi-German concentration camps
- The Holocaust in Poland
- World War II casualties of Poland
