= Alfons Maria Mazurek =

Polish Discalced Carmelite priest and martyr

Blessed Alfons Maria of the Holy Spirit OCD
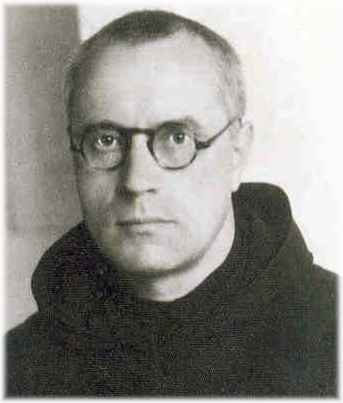

Martyr
- Born: Józef Mazurek; 1 March 1891; Baranówka, Lubelskie, Poland
- Died: 18 August 1944 (aged 53); Nawojowa Góra, Małopolskie, Poland
- Venerated in: Roman Catholic Church
- Beatified: 13 June 1999, Warsaw by Pope John Paul II
- Feast: 28 August

Alfons Maria Mazurek, also known as Alfons Maria of the Holy Spirit (1 March 1891 – 18 August 1944) was a Polish Discalced Carmelite friar and priest. He was shot by the Gestapo. He is one of the 108 Martyrs of World War II.

== Biography ==
Józef Mazurek was born to Wojciech and Marianna (née Goździów) Mazurek. After graduating from the local grammar school and the Small Seminary of the Discalced Carmelites in Wadowice, in 1908 he entered the Dicalced Carmelites' novitiate in Czerna, taking the name of Alfons Maria of the Holy Spirit. He studied theology and philosophy in Kraków, Linz, and Vienna, and there in the cathedral of St. Stephen, on 16 July 1916, he was ordained.

Mazurek was a professor and rector of the Carmelite seminary and director of the tertiaries at the monastery in Wadowice. In 1930 he was elected prior of the convent in Czerna. In 1936, he became the first visitor of the Carmelite communities in Poland; he wrote new statutes for them in 1937. He also left in elaborate hymns in manuscript form (he is the author of Tam in the Silence of the Blue Forests). He prepared for publication a breviary for Carmelite tertiaries and retreat texts written by the Carmelite Fr. Marcin Rubczyński. Mazurek also published articles in the pages of Głos Karmelu ("The Voice of Carmel").

Separated from the friars and residents of Czerna, who had been forced to work on the town's fortifications, Mazurek died on 28 August 1944, shot by an SS soldier.

He was beatified by John Paul II on 13 June 1999 along with a group of other Polish martyrs of the Second World War. The relics of Blessed Alfons are in the church of the Discalced Carmelites in Wadowice.
