= Franciszek Rogaczewski =

Polish Roman Catholic priest and martyr

Blessed Franciszek Rogaczewski

Martyr
- Born: 23 December 1892; Lipinki, West Prussia, German Empire
- Died: 11 January 1940 (aged 47); Sztutowo, Poland
- Beatified: 13 June 1999 by Pope John Paul II
- Feast: 11 January, 12 June (with the Polish Martyrs of World War II)

Franciszek Rogaczewski (23 December 1892 – 11 January 1940) was a Polish Catholic priest who was arrested by the Nazis and killed at Stutthof concentration camp. He is a martyr of the Roman Catholic church, and was beatified by Pope John Paul II on 13 June 1999.

== Life ==
Franciszek Rogaczewski was born on 23 December 1892 in Lipinki, Kujawsko-Pomorskie, Poland. He studied for the priesthood and was ordained in Gdańsk in 1918. As pastor of Christ the King parish, he was a highly renowned and much sought-after confessor. Rogaczewski was arrested on 1 September 1939 by the Nazis for the crime of being a priest. He was tortured for months before being shot to death on 11 January 1940 while imprisoned at Stutthof concentration camp (located near Sztutowo, Poland).

== Veneration ==
After his death, Rogaczewski was recognized as one of the 108 Martyrs of World War II. He was beatified by Pope John Paul II on 13 June 1999. His feast day is 11 January; there is also a group memorial for the 108 Polish Martyrs of World War II whose memorial is celebrated on 12 June.
