= Aleksy Sobaszek =

Polish Roman Catholic priest and martyr

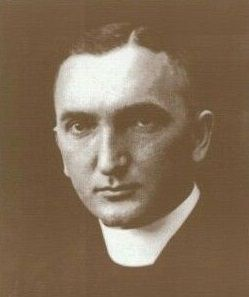
- Photograph of Sobaszek circa 1935
- Born: August 17, 1895; Groß Pschygodschitz, Province of Posen, German Empire
- Died: August 1, 1942; Dachau concentration camp, Dachau, Germany
- Beatified: June 13, 1999, Warsaw, Poland by Pope John Paul II
- Feast: June 12

Aleksy Sobaszek (1895–1942) was a Polish Roman Catholic priest. He died in a Nazi concentration camp. He is one of the 108 Martyrs of World War II who were beatified by Pope John Paul II in 1999.
