= Edward Klinik =

Polish resistance fighter and Roman Catholic martyr

Edward Klinik

Edward Klinik (21 July 1919 – 24 August 1942) was a Polish Roman Catholic anti-Nazi resistance fighter. One of the Poznań Five (Poznańska Piątka), he was guillotined in a prison in Dresden for his resistance work. He is one of the 108 Martyrs of World War II who were beatified by Pope John Paul II in 1999.

== See also ==
- List of Nazi-German concentration camps
- The Holocaust in Poland
- World War II casualties of Poland
