= Edward Detkens =

Polish Roman Catholic priest and martyr

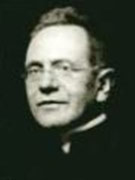
Edward Detkens

Edward Detkens (1885–1942) was a Polish Roman Catholic priest. He was imprisoned in the Nazi Sachsenhausen concentration camp and died at Dachau. He is one of the 108 Martyrs of World War II. He is buried at Powązki Cemetery.

== Biography ==
He was born the son of Jozefa and Aleksandra Detkens. He became a pharmacist apprentice before joining the Major Metropolitan Theology Seminary of St John the Baptist in Warsaw; he was ordained as a priest in November 1908.

== Career ==
After his work at the College of Vicars, he became vicar of Warsaw Cathedral; as well as his duties as a priest, he became prefect of several schools in Warsaw and worked with the Academy of Fine Arts, organising the annual oath-taking ceremony for young people.

He was also rector of St Anna’s Church in Warsaw.

== World War II ==
He was arrested on October 4, 1939 and taken to Pawiak, where he worked in the prison hospital; he was released after 4 months, but was re-arrested a month later and taken to Sachsenhausen.

He died in Dachau on October 10, 1942.

== Legacy ==
He was beatified on June 13, 1999 by Pope John Paul II.

== See also ==
- List of Nazi-German concentration camps
- The Holocaust in Poland
- World War II casualties of Poland
