= Józef Cebula =

Polish Roman Catholic priest and martyr

Blessed Józef Cebula
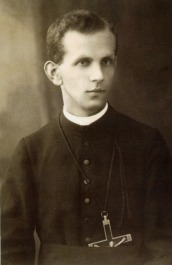
- Born: 23 March 1902; Mallnie, Upper Silesia, German Empire
- Died: 9 May 1941 (aged 39); Mauthausen-Gusen concentration camp, Nazi Germany
- Venerated in: Roman Catholic Church
- Beatified: 13 June 1999 by Pope John Paul II
- Feast: April 28

Józef Cebula (23 March 1902 – 9 May 1941) was a Polish priest of the Missionary Oblates of Mary Immaculate (OMI).

Born on 23 March 1902 into a modest family in Mallnie, Upper Silesia, German Empire (now Malnia, Poland), Joseph Cebula was the eldest of three children. He suffered tuberculosis as a youth and was declared incurable at first; but after his recovery, he went to an Oblate shrine and shared his story with Father Jan Pawolik. Pawolik suggested he study at the minor seminary at Krotoszyn. Cebula completed his secondary studies there. In 1921 he began his novitiate at Markowice. He studied philosophy in Liege, Belgium, and finished his theological studies at Lubliniec.

He was ordained as a priest on 5 June 1927 while still in a seminary. Father Cebula became a superior at the Oblate seminaries in 1931, and became novice master at Markowice in 1937.

Two years later, when the Germans occupied Poland, they declared loyalty to the Church illegal. In October 1939 the 100 member community at Markowice was placed under house arrest, and set to work as farm laborers. On 4 May 1940, the Oblate novices at Markowice were sent to the concentration camp at Dachau in Upper Bavaria, Germany. However, Father Cebula continued to minister as a priest in secret despite the ban on it. After being denounced for administering the sacraments to the sick he was arrested by the SS on 2 April 1941 and sent to the camp at Inowroclaw. On 7 April, he was taken to a concentration camp at Mauthausen in Austria (then part of Nazi Germany) and was harassed and forced to hard labor. On 9 May, Father Cebula suddenly summoned up his strength and said, "It is not you who are in charge. God will judge you." The Nazis ordered him to run with a rock on his back, towards the camp's barbed wire fence, where a guard shot him to death with a submachine gun and declared that Father Cebula "was shot while trying to escape". His body was taken to a crematorium and burned to ashes.

He was beatified by Pope John Paul II on 13 June 1999 as one of the 108 Martyrs of World War II.
