= Natalia Tułasiewicz =

Polish teacher, rebel, and Roman Catholic martyr

Natalia Tułasiewicz

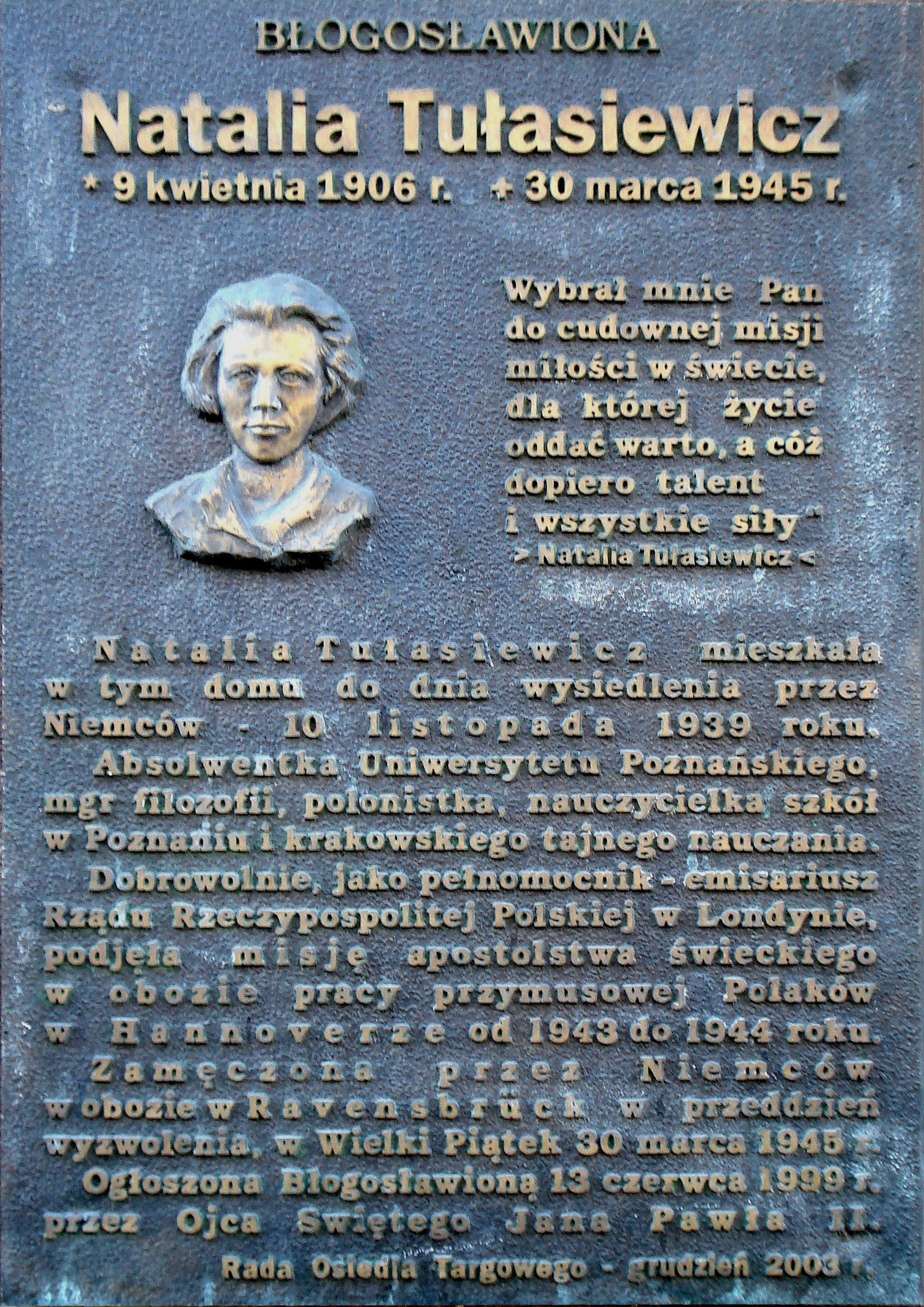
Memorial plaque to Natalia Tułasiewicz in Poznań

Natalia Tułasiewicz (9 April 1906 – 31 March 1945) was a Polish teacher in Poznań, Second Polish Republic, and a leader in the Catholic lay apostolate. A member of the Polish Underground State, she was murdered in a gas chamber at the Ravensbrück concentration camp. Tułasiewicz was beatified in 1999 as one of the 108 Martyrs of World War II.

== Biography ==
Natalia Tułasiewicz was born in Rzeszów on 9 April 1906. She moved with her family to Poznań in 1921. After graduating from the Poznań University, she worked as a teacher and was a lay apostolate leader.

During the occupation of Poland, her family was among the many Polish families who were dispossessed by the Germans after annexation of Poznań, thrown out of their homes with only a few hours' notice. She became involved in the underground education of children in Kraków and was a member of the Polish Underground State. In 1943, she volunteered to leave Poland with other women who were being forced to perform heavy work in Germany. She hoped to give them spiritual comfort. When the Germans found out about her secret mission, she was arrested, tortured, and condemned to death in the Ravensbrück concentration camp. On Good Friday 1945, she climbed a stool in the barracks and spoke to the prisoners on the Passion and Resurrection of Jesus. On Easter Sunday, 31 March, she was murdered in a gas chamber. The concentration camp was liberated two days later.

Natalia Tułasiewicz is one of only two lay women among the 108 Martyrs of World War II, all of whom were beatified on 13 June 1999 by Pope John Paul II.
