= Anselmo Ricardo Ribeiro =

Brazilian Catholic priest and missionary

The Reverend Anselmo Ricardo Ribeiro S.V.D.
- Church: Catholic Church
- Installed: 4 July 2024
- Predecessor: Paulus Budi Kleden

Orders
- Ordination: 30 April 2005 by Silvestre Luís Scandian

Personal details
- Born: June 6, 1974 (age 52) Rio de Janeiro, Brazil
- Denomination: Roman Catholic

Anselmo Ricardo Ribeiro, S.V.D. (born 6 June 1974), is a Brazilian Catholic priest and missionary of the Society of the Divine Word. Since July 2024, he has served as Superior General of the congregation, becoming the first Brazilian and the first Latin American elected to the position.

== Early life and education ==
Anselmo Ricardo Ribeiro was born on 6 June 1974 in Rio de Janeiro, Brazil, at Pedro II Hospital in the neighborhood of Santa Cruz. He is the youngest of six children of Hilda de Freitas Ribeiro and Domingo Ribeiro Filho.

He attended the Technical School of the Federal Rural University of Rio de Janeiro (CTUR), in Seropédica. During his youth, he participated in activities at Saint Benedict Parish and in Catholic youth movements, including the Catholic Charismatic Renewal.

In 1994, he entered the seminary of the Society of the Divine Word, completing preparatory studies in Juiz de Fora. From 1995 to 1997, he studied philosophy at the Saint Thomas Aquinas Institute (ISTA) in Belo Horizonte.

In 1998, he completed his novitiate in Juquiá, in the Diocese of Registro, and professed his first religious vows on 10 January 1999.

He later studied theology in São Paulo and carried out missionary work in Salto de Agua, Chiapas, Mexico, between 2001 and 2002. He also studied journalism at the Higher Education Center of Juiz de Fora (CES/JF).

== Priesthood ==
Ribeiro professed his perpetual vows in March 2004 at the Basilica of the National Shrine of Our Lady of Aparecida. He was ordained deacon in April 2004.

He was ordained a priest on 30 April 2005 in Santa Cruz, Rio de Janeiro, by Bishop Silvestre Luís Scandian, emeritus bishop of Vitória.

After ordination, he served as parochial vicar in Barra Mansa between 2005 and 2006. In 2007, he became parish priest in Três Rios, in the Diocese of Valença.

From 2008 to 2011, he served as rector of the Society of the Divine Word residence in Juiz de Fora.

== Leadership in the Society of the Divine Word ==
In September 2010, Ribeiro was elected Provincial Superior of the Brazil North Province of the Society of the Divine Word, headquartered in Belo Horizonte. He was reelected in 2014 for a second term.

Between 2014 and 2017, he served on the PANAM Regional Executive Committee of the congregation in the Americas.

In 2018, he was elected General Councilor of the Society of the Divine Word and moved to Rome.

On 4 July 2024, during the 19th General Chapter of the congregation, Ribeiro was elected Superior General for a six-year term. He became the first Latin American and the first Brazilian to lead the Society of the Divine Word.

== Activities ==
As General Councilor and Superior General, Ribeiro visited missionary communities in dozens of countries across Europe, the Americas, Asia, and Africa.

His international visits included Germany, Poland, Vatican City, Mexico, Cuba, the United States, the Philippines, Indonesia, Timor-Leste, Angola, Madagascar, and Chad.

In 2025, he presided over celebrations marking the 150th anniversary of the foundation of the Society of the Divine Word.

== See also ==
- Society of the Divine Word
- Catholic Church in Brazil
