= Nazi persecution of the Catholic Church in Poland =

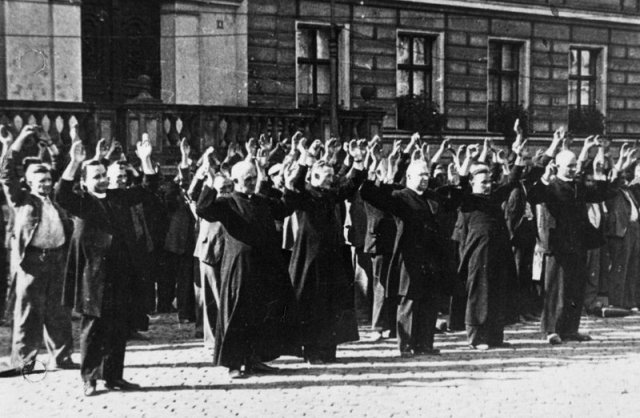
Public execution of Polish priests and civilians in Bydgoszcz's Old Market Square on 9 September 1939

During the German occupation of Poland (1939–1945), the Nazis brutally suppressed the Catholic Church in Poland, most severely in German-occupied areas of Poland. Thousands of churches and monasteries were systematically closed, seized or destroyed. As a result, many works of religious art and objects were permanently lost.

Church leaders were especially targeted as part of an overall effort to destroy Polish culture. At least 1,811 members of the Polish clergy were murdered in Nazi concentration camps. An estimated 3,000 members of the clergy were killed. Hitler's plans for the Germanization of the East did not allow Catholicism.

The actions taken against Polish Catholicism were part of Generalplan Ost which, if carried out, would have eventually eradicated the existence of the Poles. Adolf Hitler said in August 1939 that he wanted his Death's Head forces "to kill without pity or mercy all men, women, and children of Polish descent or language".

== Background ==
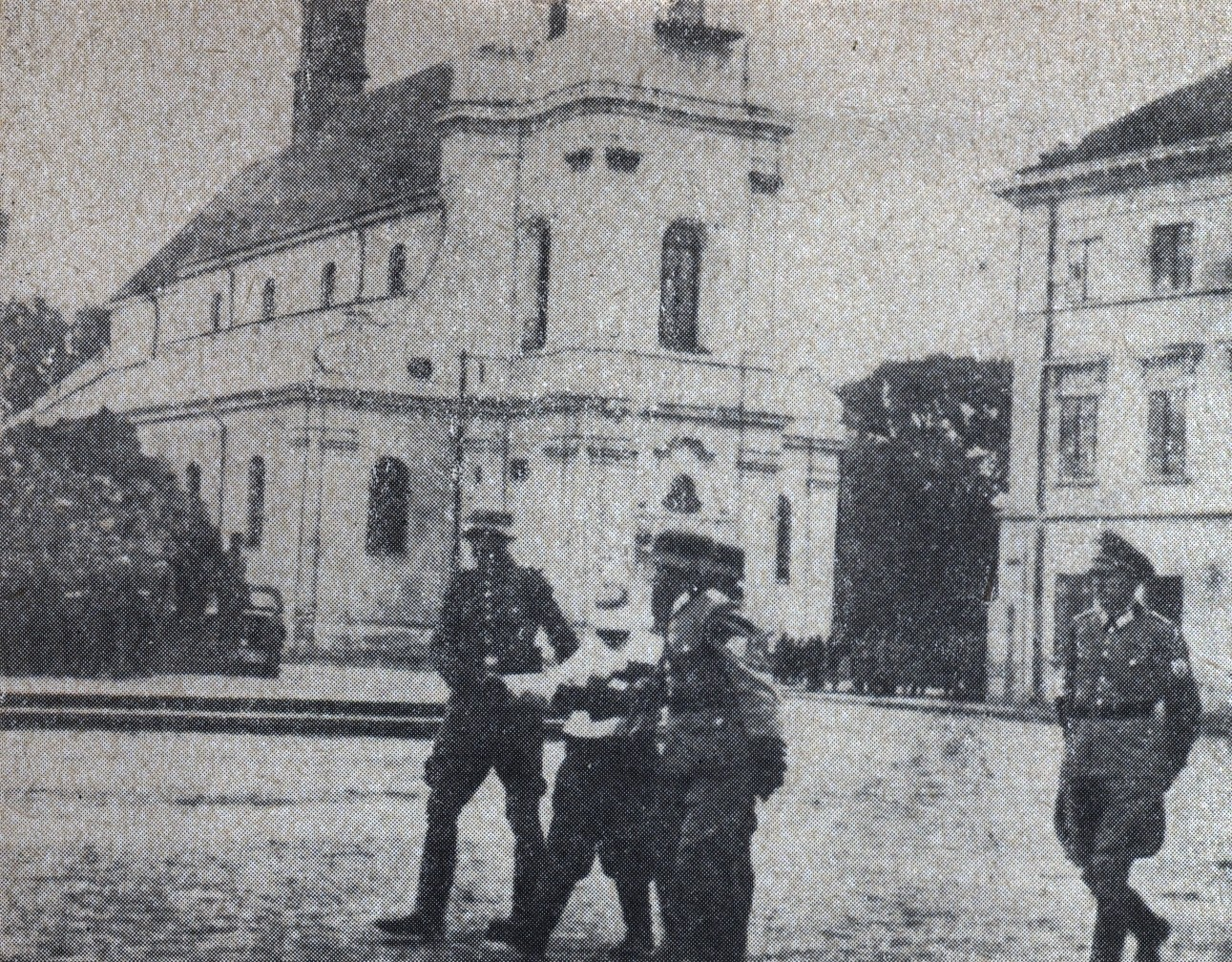
Public execution of Polish priest Roman Pawłowski in Kalisz on 18 October 1939

The Roman Catholic Church has had a presence in Poland for almost 1,000 years. Historian Richard J. Evans wrote that the Catholic Church was the institution that "more than any other had sustained Polish national identity over the centuries". By 1939, around 65% of Poles professed to be Catholic.

The invasion of predominantly Catholic Poland by Nazi Germany in 1939 ignited the Second World War. The United Kingdom and France declared war on Germany as a result of the invasion while the Soviet Union invaded the Eastern half of Poland in accordance with the Molotov–Ribbentrop Pact with Hitler.

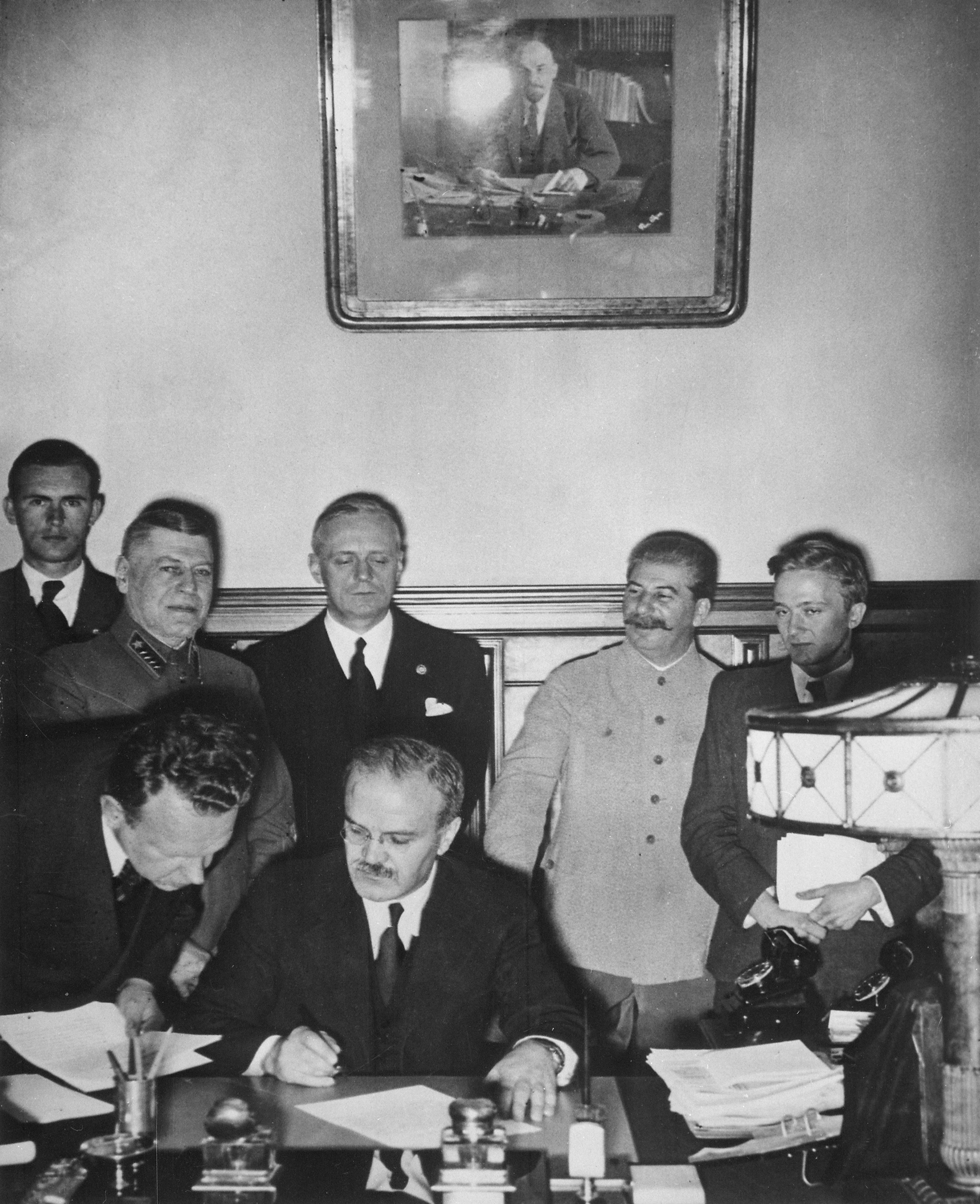
Soviet Prime Minister Vyacheslav Molotov signs the Molotov–Ribbentrop Pact. Behind him stand (left) German Foreign Minister Joachim von Ribbentrop and (right) Joseph Stalin. The Pact created a Nazi-Soviet alliance and sealed the fate of Poland.

Nazi Germany’s invasion of Poland from the West took place on 1 September 1939, commencing a period of occupation. Nazi ideology targeted Polish Jews for extermination and categorized ethnic Poles, most of whom were Catholic, as an inferior race. The Jews were rounded up into Ghettos or sent to extermination camps while the ethnic Polish intelligentsia, priests and politicians were targeted for elimination (Intelligenzaktion, AB-Aktion). Forced labor was also employed as a technique of elimination.

The Red Army invaded Poland from the East on 17 September 1939. The Soviets also repressed the Polish Catholics and clergy, with an emphasis on fighting "class enemies". The Soviet occupation lasted nearly two years. Operation Barbarossa, the German attack on the Soviet Union was launched in June 1941, shattering the Nazi-Soviet non-aggression pact and bringing all of Poland under Nazi control. Norman Davies wrote:

Adolf Hitler hated Poland with a will. For Poland lay at the heart of the Nazis' Lebensraum, the ideological "living space" into which Germany was raring to expand. It was inhabited moreover by a mixture of Slavs and Jews, both of which were classed in the Nazi handbooks as Untermenschen, or subhumans...[-] Hitler specifically ordered his minions to act with great cruelty.

— Norman Davies; Rising '44: the Battle for Warsaw

The Nazi plan for Poland included the destruction of the Polish nation, which required attacking the Polish Church, particularly in areas annexed to Germany. Biographer Ian Kershaw said in the scheme for the Germanization of Central and Eastern Europe, that Hitler had made it clear there would be "no place in this utopia for the Christian Churches".

Nazi ideology was hostile to Christianity and Hitler held the teachings of the Catholic Church in contempt. Hitler's chosen deputy and private secretary Martin Bormann and the official Nazi philosopher Alfred Rosenberg were firmly anti-Christian. In his 1930 book Myth of the Twentieth Century, Rosenberg wrote that the main enemies of Germans were the "Russian Tartars" and "Semites" – including Christians, especially the Christians of the Catholic Church.

=== Division of Poland ===
The German military controlled Poland until 25 October 1939. Following this, Germany annexed Polish territories into the eastern German provinces: Reichsgau Wartheland, Reichsgau Danzig-West Prussia, Province of Silesia, and East Prussia. The remainder of Nazi-occupied Poland came under the administration of the General Government – a "police run mini-state" under SS control and the rule of Nazi lawyer Hans Frank. Davies wrote that this area "became the lawless laboratory of Nazi racial ideology,” over time becoming the base of the main Nazi concentration camps. However, Nazi policy toward the Church was less severe than in the annexed regions.

== Persecutions ==
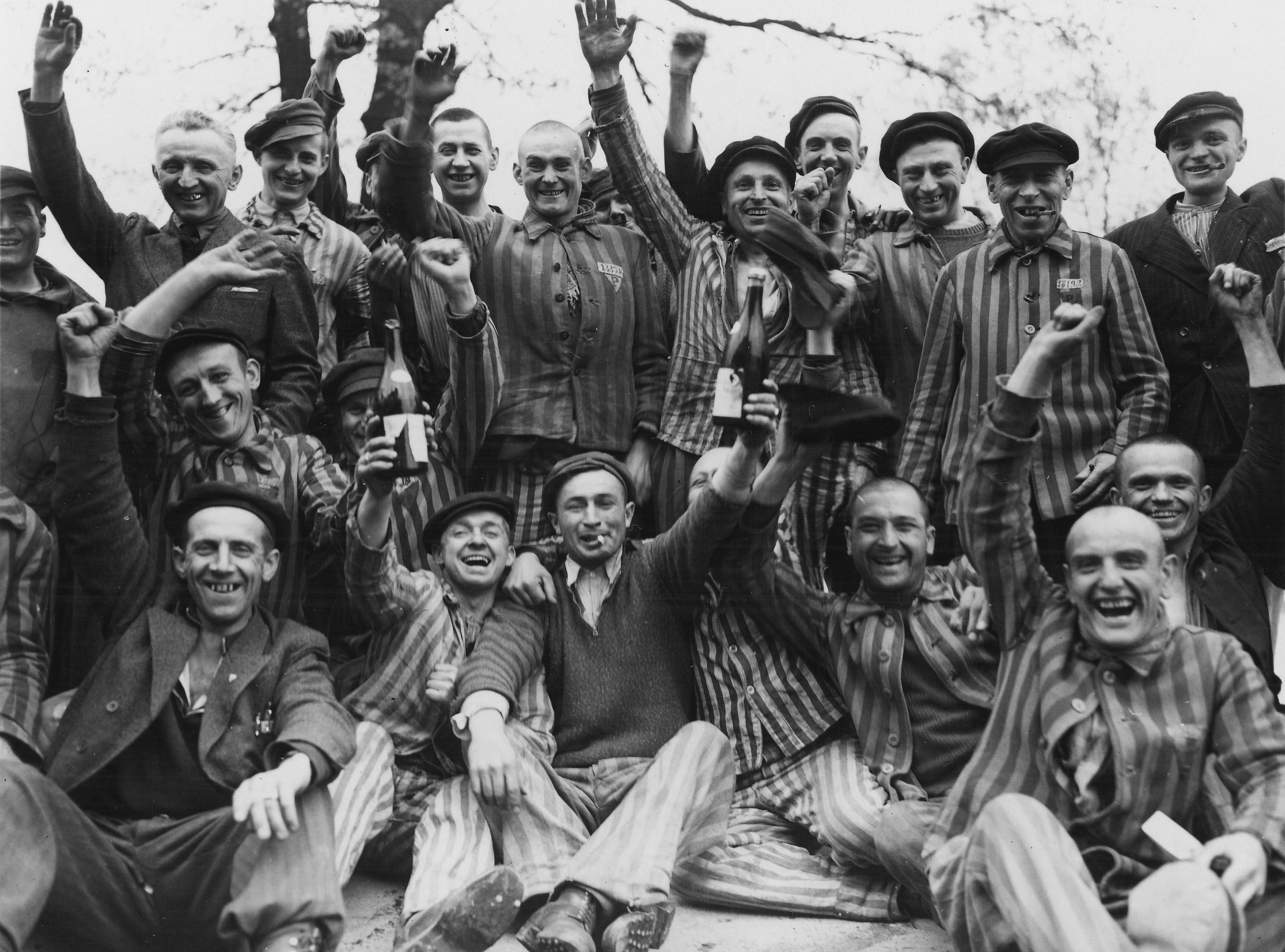
Polish prisoners in Dachau toast their liberation from the camp. Poles constituted the largest ethnic group in the camp and the largest proportion of those imprisoned in the Priest Barracks of Dachau.

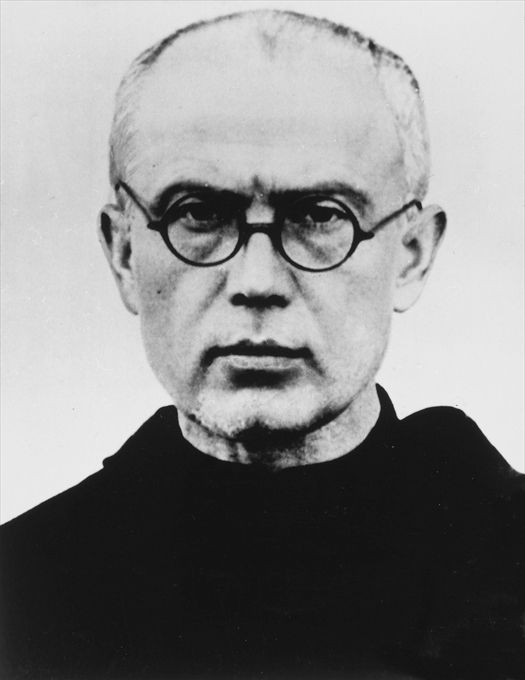
The Polish Franciscan St Maximillian Kolbe was murdered at Auschwitz.

=== Targeting of intelligentsia and clergy ===
According to Norman Davies, the Nazi terror was "much more fierce and more protracted in Poland than anywhere in Europe." The Nazi ideology viewed ethnic "Poles"—the mainly Catholic ethnic majority of Poland—as "sub-humans". Following their 1939 invasion of West Poland, the Nazis instigated a policy of genocide against Poland's Jewish minority. They murdered or suppressed the ethnic Polish elites including religious leaders. During the 1939 invasion, special death squads of SS and police were sent to arrest or execute anyone considered capable of resisting the occupation: professionals, clergymen, and government officials.

The following summer, the A-B Aktion (Extraordinary Pacification Operation) rounded up several thousand Polish intelligentsia and the SS shot many of the priests in the General Government sector. During this operation, Poland was under military control. This period of military control lasted from 1 September 1939 to 25 October 1939. During this period, "according to one source, 714 mass executions were carried out, and 6,376 people, mainly Catholics, were shot. Others put the death toll in one town alone at 20,000. It was a taste of things to come."

In 1940, Hitler proclaimed: "Poles may have only one master – a German. Two masters cannot exist side by side, and this is why all members of the Polish intelligentsia must be killed." According to Craughwell, between 1939 and 1945, an estimated 3,000 members (18%) of the Polish clergy, were murdered. Of these, 1,992 were murdered in concentration camps (the Encyclopædia Britannica cites 1811 Polish priests murdered in Nazi concentration camps).

On November 16 and 17 of 1940, Vatican Radio broadcast that the religious life of Polish Catholics continued to be brutally restricted. They claimed that at least 400 clerics had been deported to Germany in the preceding four months:

The Catholic Associations in the General Government also have been dissolved, the Catholic educational institutions have been closed down, and Catholic professors and teachers have been reduced to a state of extreme need or have been sent to concentration camps. The Catholic press has been rendered impotent. In the part incorporated into the Reich, and especially in Posnania, the representatives of the Catholic priests and orders have been shut up in concentration camps. In other dioceses the priests have been put in prison. Entire areas of the country have been deprived of all spiritual ministrations and the church seminaries have been dispersed.

— Vatican Radio, November 1940

Around 150,000 to 180,000 civilians were killed in the suppression of an uprising, along with thousands of captured insurgents. Until the end of September 1944, Polish resistance fighters were not considered by Germany as combatants. Thus, when captured, they were executed. 165,000 surviving civilians were sent to labor camps; while 50,000 were shipped to concentration camps, and the city was systematically demolished.

=== Annexed Regions ===
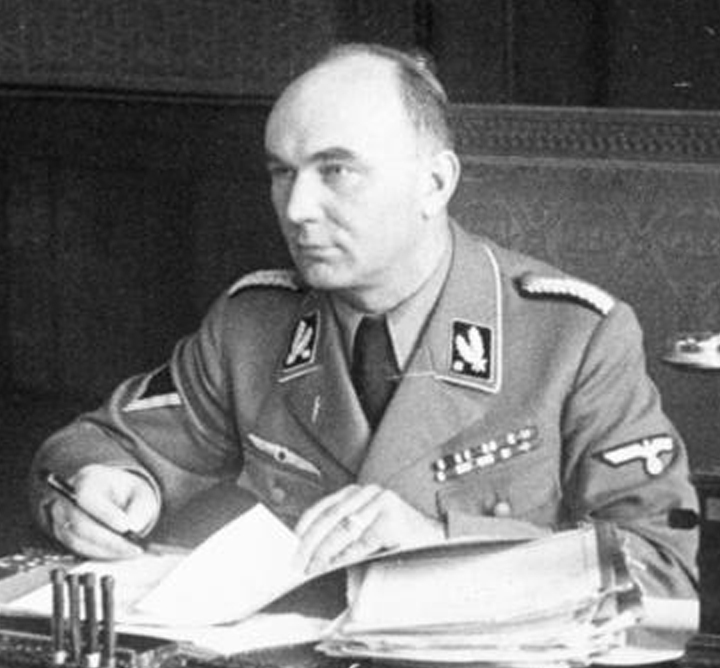
Arthur Greiser, the Reichsstatthalter of Wartheland, led a radical attack on the Catholic Church. By late 1941, the Polish Church had effectively been outlawed in Wartheland.

Nazi policy towards the Church was at its most severe in the territories it annexed to Greater Germany, where the Nazis set about systematically dismantling the Church – arresting its leaders, exiling its clergymen, closing its churches, monasteries and convents. Many clergymen were murdered. The annexed areas included the Catholic archdiocese of Gniezno-Poznań and the dioceses of Chełmno, Katowice and Włocławek, and parts of the dioceses of Częstochowa, Kielce, Kraków, Łomża, Łódź, Płock and Warsaw, which were all to be "Germanized". In these areas, the Polish Church was to be thoroughly eradicated, though German Catholics could remain or settle there.

Hitler intended to use Poland as a colony for settlement by Germans. The indigenous Poles were to be cleared out to make room for German settlers. Following the defeat of Poland, Heinrich Himmler was appointed Reich Commissioner for the Strengthening of the German Race. Germanization of the annexed regions began in December 1939 with deportations of men, women, and children. In the Wartheland, regional leader Arthur Greiser, with the encouragement of Reinhard Heydrich and Martin Bormann, launched an attack on the Catholic Church. Its properties and funds were confiscated, and lay organisations shut down. Evans wrote that "numerous clergy, monks, diocesan administrators and officials of the Church were arrested, deported to the General Government, taken off to a concentration camp in the Reich, or simply shot. Altogether some 1700 Polish priests ended up at Dachau: half of them did not survive their imprisonment." Greiser's administrative chief August Jager had earlier led the effort at Nazification of the Evangelical Church in Prussia. In Poland, he earned the nickname "Kirchen-Jager" (Church-Hunter) for the vehemence of his hostility to the Church. "By the end of 1941", wrote Evans, "the Polish Catholic Church had been effectively outlawed in the Wartheland. It was more or less Germanized in the other occupied territories, despite an encyclical issued by the Pope as early as 27 October 1939 protesting against this persecution."

In West Prussia, 460 of the existing 690 Polish priests were arrested; the survivors simply fled; only 20 were still serving in 1940. Of those arrested, 214 were executed; the rest were deported to General Government. Fatalities were numerous: in Wrocław, 49.2% of the clergy were dead; in Chełmno, 47.8%; in Łódź, 36.8%; in Poznań, 31.1%. In the Warsaw diocese, 212 clergy were murdered; in Vilnius, 92; in Lwów, 81; in Kraków, 30; in Kielce, 13. Nuns shared a similar fate; about 400 nuns were imprisoned at Bojanowo concentration camp. Many seminary students and nuns were conscripted as forced laborers. In Poznań, only two churches were not closed or re-purposed; in Łódź, only four remained open.

Poland's higher clergy was not exempt from repression; some were forced to retire, whereas others were arrested, imprisoned, or executed. Among those, Bishops Marian Leon Fulman, Władysław Goral, Michał Kozal, Antoni Julian Nowowiejski and Leon Wetmański were sent to concentration camps, with Goral, Nowowiejski, Kozal and Wetmański being murdered in Sachsenhausen, Dachau, Soldau and Auschwitz, respectively.

=== Cardinal Hlond's Report ===
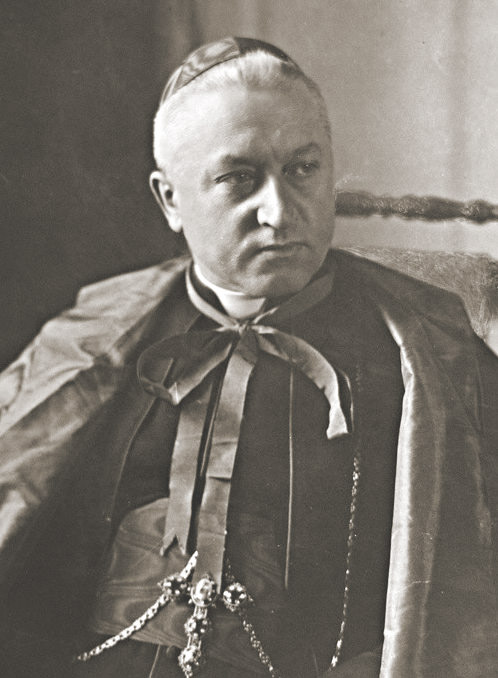
The Primate of Poland, Cardinal August Hlond, advised the Pope that "Hitlerism aims at the systematic and total destruction of the Catholic Church" in territories of Poland annexed by Germany.

In the aftermath of invasion, the Primate of Poland, Cardinal August Hlond, submitted an official account of the persecutions of the Polish Church to the Vatican. He reported seizures of church property and abuse of clergy and nuns in the Archdiocese of Gniezno:

Many priests are imprisoned, suffering humiliations, blows, maltreatment. A certain number were deported to Germany... Others have been detained in concentration camps... It is not rare to see a priest in the midst of labour gangs working in the fields... Some of them have even been shut up for the night in pigsties, barbarously beaten and subjected to other tortures... The Canon Casimir Stepczynski... was forced in company with a Jew to carry away the human excrement... the curate who wished to take the place of the venerable priest was brutally beaten with a rifle butt

— Excerpts from Cardinal Hlond's report to the Vatican.

Opening hours for churches (that still had their priests) had been restricted to Sundays from 9 am to 11 am. Sermons could only be preached in German. Polish hymns were proscribed. Crucifixes were removed from schools and religious instructions were forbidden. Catholic Action had been banned and Catholic charities such as St Vincent de Paul dissolved and their funds confiscated. Religious shrines and statues in public places were "battered to the ground".

In the Archdiocese of Poznań, Hlond reported that clergy were being subjected to the same mistreatment as in Gniezno and a number had been shot, deported, imprisoned or were missing. In Poznań, which had served as the centre for organisation of Church activities in Poland, the Nazis suppressed the National Institute for Catholic Action, the Pontifical Association for the Propagation of the Faith, the Association of Catholic Women, and Catholic youth groups. Other Catholic media and educational organisations were likewise suppressed. The leaders of Catholic Action were imprisoned and Edward Potworowski, the president of the Catholic Youth Association was publicly shot in Gostyn Square, while the president of the Catholic Girls Association was expelled to Central Poland. The Curia and the Metropolitan court were taken over by the Gestapo and their records seized. The archiepiscopal palace was invaded and taken over by soldiers and its archives were handed over to the Gestapo. The Cathedral of Poznań was closed and the theological seminary converted into a police school. Polish youth were arrested after mass and deported to Germany.

In the Diocese of Chełmno, which had been incorporated into the Reich, Hlond reported that religious life had been almost entirely suppressed, and the ancient cathedral had been closed and turned into a garage. Its noted statue of Mary had been overturned, and the bishop's residence ransacked. Clergy and laymen had been tortured and church properties seized. Only 20 of 650 priests remained – the rest imprisoned, deported or forced into labour – sometimes resulting in death from fatigue:

[In the Diocese of Chełmno] It is stated that a large number of priests have been shot, but neither the number nor the details are as yet known, as the occupation authorities maintain an obstinate silence on the subject... The Churches have almost all been closed and confiscated by the Gestapo... all the crosses and sacred emblems by the roadside have been destroyed... 95% of the priests have been imprisoned, expelled, or humiliated before the eyes of the faithful... and the most eminent Catholics executed.

— Excerpts from Cardinal August Hlond's report to the Vatican.

Hlond reported similar outrages and terror in the Dioceses of Katowice, Łódź and Włocławek which had also been incorporated into the Reich. In his final observations for Pope Pius XII, Hllond wrote:

Hitlerism aims at the systematic and total destruction of the Catholic Church in the rich and fertile territories of Poland which have been incorporated into the Reich... It is known for certain that 35 priests have been shot, but the real number of victims... undoubtedly amounts to more than a hundred... In many districts the life of the Church has been completely crushed, the clergy have been almost all expelled; the Catholic churches and cemeteries are in the hands of the invaders... Catholic worship hardly exists any more... Monasteries and convents have been methodically suppressed... [Church properties] all have been pillaged by the invaders.

— Excerpts from Cardinal Hlond's report to the Vatican

== Polish Clergy during occupation ==
Eighty percent of the Catholic clergy and five bishops of Warthegau were sent to concentration camps in 1939; 108 of them are regarded as blessed martyrs. Around 1.5 million Poles were transported to work as forced labor in Germany. Treated as racially inferior, they had to wear purple P's sewn into their clothing – sexual relations with Germans were punishable by death. Beyond the genocide of the Polish Jews, it is estimated that 1.8 to 1.9 million Polish civilians were murdered during the German Occupation and the war. Hundreds of priests and nuns are among the 5000 Polish Catholics honored by Israel for their role in saving Jews.

The university professor, and post-war Primate of Poland, Fr. Stefan Wyszynski, was ordered to leave Włocławek by his bishop, Michal Kozal and thus escaped the fate of Kozal and nearly 2000 other priests who were murdered in Nazi Concentration camps.

=== Priests at Dachau Concentration Camp ===
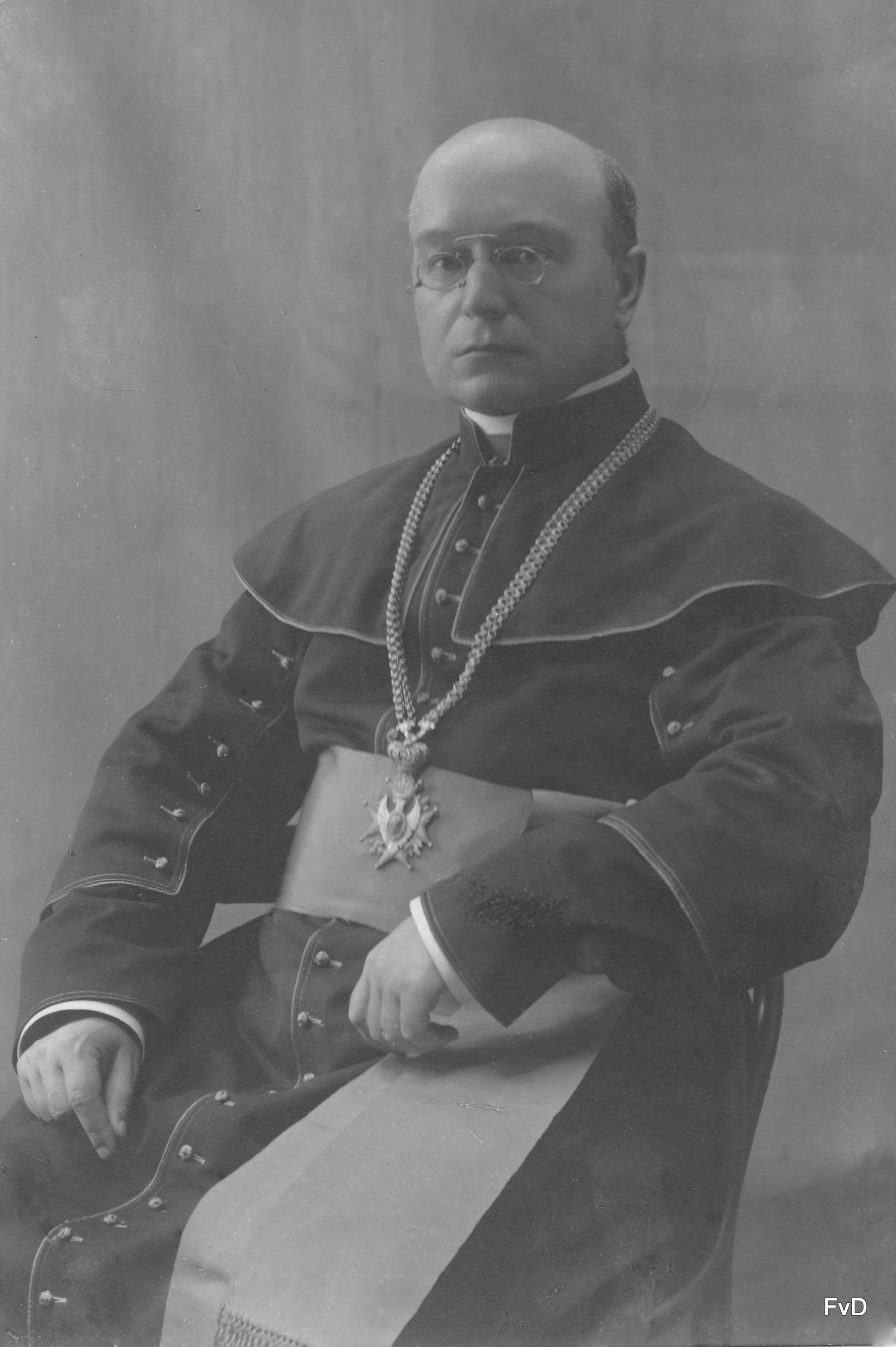
The Blessed Antoni Zawistowski was tortured and murdered at Dachau in 1942. 1780 Polish clergy were sent to Dachau, and many are remembered among the 108 Polish Martyrs of World War II.

Dachau was established in March 1933 as the first Nazi Concentration Camp. Dachau was chiefly a political camp and an estimated 2,720 (mainly Catholic) clergy were imprisoned at the camp; the Nazis established dedicated Clergy Barracks. From this number recorded as being imprisoned at Dachau, some 2,579 (or 94.88%) were Catholic. A total of 1,034 clergy were recorded overall as dying in the camp, with 132 "transferred or liquidated" during that time. There are slightly different numbers in Dachau: The Official History 1933–1945. Author Paul Berben noted that R. Schnabel's 1966 investigation, Die Frommen in der Holle found an alternative total of 2,771 clergy. This also included the fate all the clergy listed, with 692 noted as having been murdered at the camp and 336 sent out on "invalid trainloads" and therefore presumed murdered.

Total numbers are unknown, as some clergy were not recognized as such by the camp authorities, and some – particularly Poles – did not wish to be identified as such, fearing they would be mistreated. The greatest number of clerical prisoners came from Poland. In all some 1,748 Polish Catholic clerics, of whom some 868 were murdered in the camp. From 1940, Dachau became the concentration point for clerical prisoners. Priests were gathered in Blocks 26, 28 and 30, though only temporarily. 26 became the international block and 28 was reserved for Poles – the most numerous group.

The Nazis introduced a racial hierarchy – keeping Poles in harsh conditions while favoring German priests. 697 Poles arrived in December 1941, and a further 500 of mainly elderly clergy were brought in October 1942. Inadequately clothed for the bitter cold, only 82 of this latter group survived. A large number of Polish priests were chosen for Nazi medical experiments. In November 1942, 20 were given phlegmons. 120 were used by Dr. Schilling for malaria experiments between July 1942 and May 1944. Several Poles died on "invalid trains" sent out from the camp, others were murdered in the camp and given fake death certificates. Some died of punishment for misdemeanors – beaten to death or run to exhaustion.

Polish priests were not permitted to undertake the religious activity. Anti-religious prisoners were planted in the Polish block to ensure that the rule was not broken, but some found ways to circumvent the prohibition: secretly celebrating the mass during their work. By 1944, with Germany's hopes of victory in the war fading, conditions had been relaxed and Poles could hold a weekly service. Eventually, they were allowed to attend chapel. Religious activity outside the chapel was totally forbidden. Non-clergy were forbidden from the chapel, and, Berben wrote, the German clergy feared that breaking this rule would lose them their chapel: "the clergy in Block 26 observed this rule in a heartless way which naturally raised a storm of protest. With the Poles in Block 28 it was different: all Christians of whatever nationality were welcomed as brothers and invited to attend the clandestine Sunday masses, celebrated before dawn in conditions reminiscent of the catacombs".

== Resistance ==
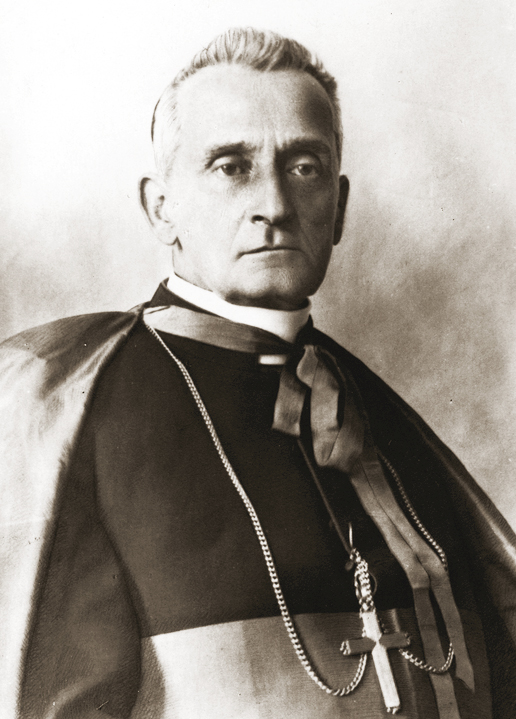
Adam Sapieha, Archbishop of Kraków, became the de facto head of the Polish church following the invasion and was a principal figure in the Polish resistance.

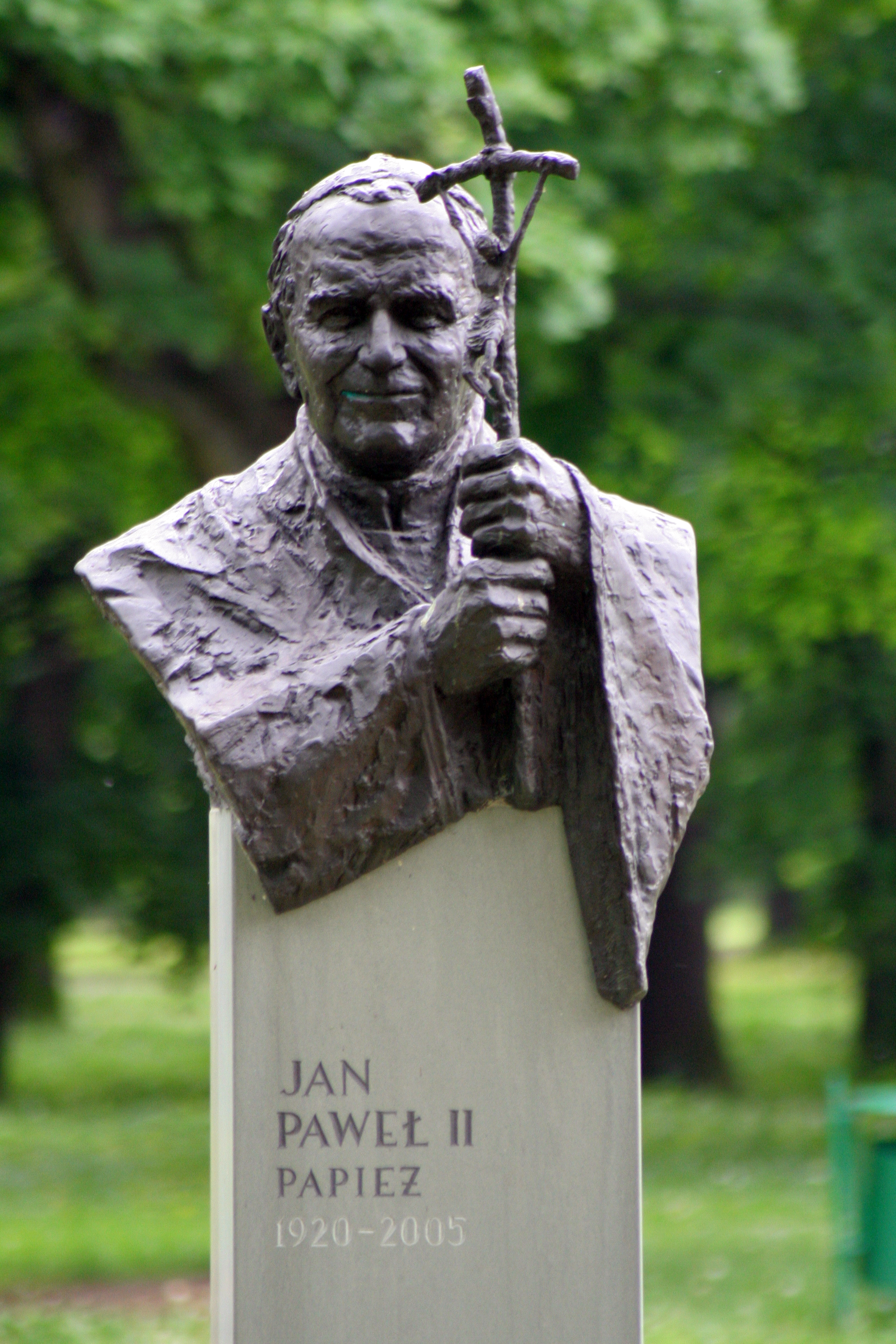
Memorial to Pope John Paul II, in Kraków. As a young man, John Paul II had participated in the Polish cultural resistance to the Nazi occupation of Poland.

Following the surrender of the Polish government at the end of September 1939, the Polish Underground and the Armia Krajowa (Home Army), loyal to the Polish Government in exile, resisted the Nazi occupation. The position of the Polish resistance was complicated greatly following the Nazi invasion of the Soviet Union. Stalin, who intended to install a post-war Communist regime, allowed the Warsaw Uprising to be put down by the Nazis which resulted in 200,000 civilians dead and the Western Allies eventually recognised the Moscow-backed government over the London-based legal government of Poland. At the end of the war, the Sovietisation of Poland ensued.

The Polish Home Army was conscious of the link between morale and religious practice and the Catholic religion was integral to much Polish resistance, particularly during the Warsaw Uprising of 1944. Despite persecution, Catholic priests preached national spirit and encouraged resistance across Poland, and the Resistance was full of clergy. Thousands of Poles have been honoured as Righteous Among the Nations for helping Jews – constituting the largest national contingent and hundreds of clergymen and nuns were involved in aiding Jews during the war.

Adam Sapieha, Archbishop of Kraków, became the de facto head of the Polish church following the invasion. He openly criticized Nazi terror. Sapieha became a symbol of Polish Resistance and played an important role in the rescue of Jews. He opened a clandestine seminary in an act of cultural resistance. Among the seminarians was Karol Wojtyla, the future Pope John Paul II. Wojtyla had been a member of the Rhapsodic Theatre, an underground resistance group, which sought to sustain Polish culture through forbidden readings of poetry and drama performances. Wladyslaw Bartoszewski, a co-founder of Zegota, had worked with the Catholic underground movement, the Front for the Rebirth of Poland, and was arrested in a 1940 Nazi purge of the intelligentsia, and sent to Auschwitz. Freed seven months later following pressure from the international Red Cross, Bartoszewski and Zegota saved thousands of Jews.

Poland had a large Jewish population, and according to Davies, the number of Jews murdered and the number of Jews rescued was higher than in any other nation: the rescue figure usually being put at between 100,000 and 150,000. Poland had its own tradition of antisemitism. According to Davies, as part of its efforts to repress potential opponents of the regime, the Communist state which established itself in Poland following the war exaggerated the presence of antisemitism in Poland, and systematically besmirched and repressed dedicated Catholics who had opposed the Holocaust, as in the 1948-9 "Zegota Case". Hundreds of clergymen and nuns were involved in aiding Poland's Jews during the war, though precise numbers are difficult to confirm. The monasteries played an important role in the protection of Jews. Matylda Getter, mother superior of the Franciscan Sisters of the Family of Mary, hid many children in her Pludy convent. In Kolonia Wilenska, Sister Anna Borkowska hid men from the Jewish underground from the Vilna ghetto. From 1941, such aid carried the death penalty. A number of Bishops provided aid to Polish Jews, notably Karol Niemira, the Bishop of Pinsk, who co-operated with the underground organization maintaining ties with the Jewish ghetto and sheltered Jews in the Archbishop's residence.

When AK Home Army Intelligence discovered the true fate of transports leaving the Jewish Ghetto, the Council to Aid Jews – Rada Pomocy Żydom (codename Zegota) was established in late 1942, in co-operation with church groups. The organisation saved thousands. Emphasis was placed on protecting children, as it was near impossible to intervene directly against the heavily guarded transports. False papers were prepared, and children were distributed among safe houses and church networks. Jewish children were often placed in church orphanages and convents.

Catholic religious fervour was a feature of the 1944 Warsaw Uprising. General Antoni Chruściel issued instructions on how front-line troops could continue to pray, recite the rosary, offer confession and religious celebrations. Churches were destroyed, but congregations were not deterred. The religious orders, particularly nuns, devoted themselves to praying for the Uprising. Clergy were involved on many levels – as chaplains to military units, or tending to the ever-increasing wounded and dying. "Nuns of various orders", wrote Davies, "acted as universal sisters of mercy and won widespread praise. Mortality among them higher than among most categories of civilians. When captured by the SS, they aroused a special fury, which frequently ended in rape or butchery". According to Davies, the Catholic religion was integral to the struggle:

Among the hundreds of chaplains attached to the Home Army was Stefan Wyszyński, who later served as Cardinal Primate of Poland in the Communist era. The religious communities, in general, remained during the Uprising, converting their crypts and cellars to bomb shelters and hospitals, and throwing themselves into social work. The enclosed Convent of the Benedictine Sisters of Eternal Adoration lifted a centuries-old ban on male visitors to serve as a strategic base for the Home Army and threw open its doors to refugees, who were nursed and fed by the sisters. The prioress received an ultimatum from the Germans but refused to leave for fear of the impact on morale. Davies wrote that the sisters began their evening prayers gathered around the tabernacle, surrounded by a thousand people, as German aircraft flew overhead and "the church collapsed in one thunderous explosion... rescue teams dug to save the living... a much diminished convent choir was singing to encourage them. At dawn a handful of nuns... filed out. Lines of insurgents saluted. And the German guns reopened fire."

== Martyrs ==
The Polish Church honours 108 Martyrs of World War II, including the 11 Sisters of the Holy Family of Nazareth murdered by the Gestapo in 1943 and known as the Blessed Martyrs of Nowogródek. The Polish church opened the cause of Józef and Wiktoria Ulma to the process of beatification in 2003. The couple and their family were murdered for sheltering Jews.

Among the most revered Polish martyrs was the Franciscan, Saint Maximillian Kolbe, who was murdered at Auschwitz-Birkenau, having offered his own life to save a fellow prisoner who had been condemned to death by the camp authorities. The cell in which he died is now a shrine. During the War, he provided shelter to refugees, including 2,000 Jews whom he hid in his friary in Niepokalanów.

== Pope Pius XII ==
Poland's allegiance to the papacy gave its plight an international dimension, of which both the Nazi and Soviet occupying powers were aware. In Poland, the Church was well organised, and the clergy were respected. Garlinski wrote that the Polish Church's "thousand year link with Rome afforded it some protection. The German Reich contained 30 million Catholics, who recognised the Pope's authority... and [each German ruler], however strongly opposed to Rome, had to take account of this..." Pope Pius XII succeeded Pius XI in March 1939, on the eve of World War II. The new Pope faced the aggressive foreign policy of Nazism, and perceived a threat to Europe and the Church from Soviet Communism, which preached atheism – "each system attacked religion, both denied freedom and the victory of either would be a defeat for the Church", wrote Garlinski. Pius XII lobbied world leaders to avoid war and then sought to negotiate a peace, but was ignored by the belligerents, as Germany and Russia began to treat Catholic Poland as their colony. In his first encyclical, Summi Pontificatus of 20 October 1939, Pius responded to the invasion of Poland. The encyclical attacked Hitler's war as "unchristian" and offered these words for Poland:

[This is an] "Hour of Darkness"... in which the spirit of violence and of discord brings indescribable suffering on mankind... The nations swept into the tragic whirlpool of war are perhaps as yet only at the "beginnings of sorrows"... but even now there reigns in thousands of families death and desolation, lamentation and misery. The blood of countless human beings, even noncombatants, raises a piteous dirge over a nation such as Our dear Poland, which, for its fidelity to the Church, for its services in the defense of Christian civilization, written in indelible characters in the annals of history, has a right to the generous and brotherly sympathy of the whole world, while it awaits, relying on the powerful intercession of Mary, Help of Christians, the hour of a resurrection in harmony with the principles of justice and true peace.

— Summi Pontificatus – Pope Pius XII, Oct. 1939

The Papal Nuncio to Poland, Fillippo Cortesi had abandoned Warsaw along with the diplomatic corps, after the invasion and the Papal Nuncio to Germany, Cesare Orsenigo, assumed the role of communicating the situation of the territories annexed to Germany – but his role of protecting the Church in Poland was in conflict with his role of facilitating better relations with the German government, and his own fascistic sympathies. Other channels existed for communications, including via the Polish primate Cardinal Hlond. The Holy See refused German requests to fill the bishoprics of the annexed territories with German bishops, claiming that it would not recognise the new boundaries until a peace treaty was signed.

In April 1940, the Holy See advised the US government of Franklin D. Roosevelt that all its efforts to deliver humanitarian aid had been blocked by the Germans and that it was therefore seeking to channel assistance through indirect routes like the American "Commission for Polish Relief". In 1942, the American National Catholic Welfare Conference reported that "as Cardinal Hlond's reports poured into the Vatican, Pope Pius XII protested against the enormities they recounted with unrelenting vigor". The Conference noted the Pope's 28 October Encyclical and reported that Pius addressed Polish clergy on 30 September 1939, speaking of "a vision of mad horror and gloomy despair" and saying that he hoped that despite the work of the "enemies of God", Catholic life would survive in Poland. In a Christmas Eve address to the College of Cardinals, Pius condemned the atrocities "even against non-combatants, refugees, old persons, women and children, and the disregard of human dignity, liberty and human life" that had taken place in the Polish war as "acts that cry for the vengeance of God".

The Vatican used its press and radio to tell the world in January 1940 of terrorization of the Polish people. On 16 and 17 November 1940, Vatican Radio said that religious life for Catholics in Poland continued to be brutally restricted and that at least 400 clergy had been deported to Germany in the preceding four months:

The Catholic Associations in the General Government also have been dissolved, the Catholic educational institutions have been closed down, and Catholic professors and teachers have been reduced to a state of extreme need or have been sent to concentration camps. The Catholic press has been rendered impotent. In the part incorporated into the Reich, and especially in Posnania, the representatives of the Catholic priests and orders have been shut up in concentration camps. In other dioceses the priests have been put in prison. Entire areas of the country have been deprived of all spiritual ministrations and the church seminaries have been dispersed.

— Vatican Radio, November 1940

In Pomerania, the Nazi Gauleiter Albert Forster permitted German priests and believed that Poles themselves could be Germanized. However, under the exceptionally aggressive policies of Arthur Greiser, the Nazi Gauleiter of the Wartheland region, German Catholics and the Protestant Church suffered a campaign to eradicate the Polish Church, prompting the head of the German Bishops Conference to ask the Pope for assistance, but Pius offered a cautious response. Though Pius had assisted with the drafting of the anti-Nazi encyclical Mit brennender Sorge, which remained binding through the war, he did not repeat it during the war, and, wrote Garlinski, he was conscious that Hitler's expansion brought 150 million Catholics under the control of the Third Reich, and that conditions for Catholics outside of Poland could be adversely affected by his pronouncements. This "restrained and reasoned stance", wrote Garlinski, though justified in the long term, "did not suit the Poles" who expected more forthright language against the Nazis, Yet, wrote Garlinski:

[T]he centuries old ties which bound [Poland] to Rome weakened the force of the occupation. The Church's role in the nation's struggle for survival and for its soul was very great and was evident in almost every area of national life. Despite losses and setbacks, the network of parishes covered the whole country and in its ministry brought comfort faith and hope. Despite personal risk, priests used their pulpits for maintaining national spirit and encouraged resistance, the bishoprics were a visible sign of the existence of an organisation, although not governmental and the resistance movement was full of clergy in all sorts of positions...[-]... the Catholic Church emerged from the war victorious, spiritually strengthened, inwardly toughened by its losses, surrounded by universal respect and ready for new and difficult days ahead.

— Extract from Poland and the Second World War by Jozef Garlinski; 1985.

== See also ==
- Catholic Church and Nazi Germany
- Nazi crimes against ethnic Poles
- Nazi persecution of the Catholic Church in Germany
- Soviet repressions of Polish citizens (1939–1946)
- Holocaust in Poland
- Holocaust victims
- Polish areas annexed by Nazi Germany
- Polish resistance movement in World War II
- Polish Underground State
- Massacre in the Jesuit monastery on Rakowiecka Street in Warsaw (1944)
