= Fidelis Chojnacki =

Polish Capuchin friar, priest, and martyr

Blessed Fidelis Chojnacki OFMCap
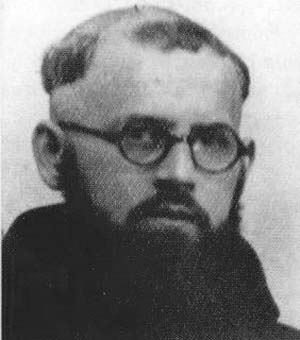
- Born: 1 November 1906; Łódź
- Died: 9 July 1942 (aged 35); Dachau
- Beatified: 13 June 1999, Warsaw by Pope John Paul II
- Feast: 12 June

Fidelis Chojnacki (1 November 1906 – 9 July 1942) was a Polish Capuchin friar and Roman Catholic priest. He was imprisoned in the Nazi Sachsenhausen concentration camp. He is one of the 108 Martyrs of World War II.

== Life ==
Born in Łódź, Fidelis was the youngest of the six children of Wacław and Leokadia (née Sprusińska). After graduating from high school, he worked for a year at the Cadet School of the Higher School of Physical Education, then he worked as a clerk at the Institute of Social Insurance in Szczuczyn Nowogródzki and at the main post office of Warsaw. He was an administrator of Catholic Action and helped recovering addicts.

He joined the Capuchin Order on 27 August 1933 in Nowe Miasto. He studied philosophy in Zakroczym and founded the Intellectual Cooperation Club for seminarians there. He continued his studies at theological studies in Lublin. He conducted pastoral work in alcoholic environments. He consistently followed the path of Francis of Assisi. He was known for his strong faith and diligence. He published several articles in the magazine “Rodzina Seraficka”: Prawdziwa pobożność w życiu tercjarza (1937), Trzeci zakon w zamiarach Kościoła (1937), Tercjarstwo wobec wymagań współczesnego życia (1937), Tercjarz w życiu parafii (1937), Dzień porachunku (1938), Misje kapucyńskie (1939).

The invasion of Poland cut short his theology studies, which started in 1937. He was arrested for his faith on 25 January 1940 and imprisoned, and on 18 June 1940 he was sent to the Sachsenhausen concentration camp. Later on 14 December 1940 he was transported to Dachau concentration camp. He died of exhaustion on 9 July 1942 and his body was cremated in the camp crematorium.

== See also ==
- List of Nazi-German concentration camps
- The Holocaust in Poland
- World War II casualties of Poland
