= Bronisław Kostkowski =

Polish Roman Catholic seminarian and martyr

Blessed Bronisław Kostkowski
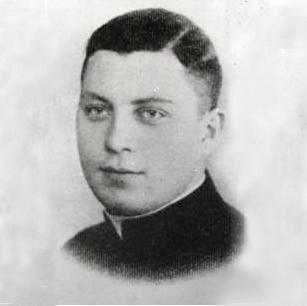
- Portrait of Kostkowski, c. 1939

Personal life
- Born: 11 March 1915 Stolp, Province of Pomerania, German Empire
- Died: 27 September 1942 (aged 27) Dachau, Gau Munich-Upper Bavaria, German Reich
- Cause of death: Exhaustion
- Home town: Bydgoszcz
- Parents: Mateusz Władysław Kostkowski (father); Maria née Wiśniewska (mother)

Religious life
- Religion: Christianity
- Denomination: Catholicism
- Ordination: 1939

Bronisław Kostkowski (March 11, 1915 – September 27, 1942) was a Polish and Roman Catholic seminarian. He was born in Stolp. He was imprisoned in the Nazi Sachsenhausen concentration camp and later died at the Nazi Dachau concentration camp. He is one of the 108 Martyrs of World War II who were beatified by Pope John Paul II in 1999.

== See also ==
- List of Nazi-German concentration camps
- The Holocaust in Poland
- World War II casualties of Poland
