= Innocent Guz =

Polish Roman Catholic priest and martyr

Blessed Innocent Guz OFM Conv.
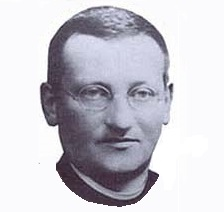

Martyr
- Born: 18 March 1890; Lemberg, Kingdom of Galicia and Lodomeria, Austria-Hungary
- Died: 6 June 1940 (aged 50); Sachsenhausen concentration camp, Oranienburg, Nazi Germany
- Venerated in: Roman Catholic Church
- Beatified: 13 June 1999, Warsaw, Poland by Pope John Paul II
- Feast: 6 June

Innocent Guz OFM Conv. (Polish: Innocenty Guz; 18 March 1890 in Lemberg, Austria – 6 June 1940), born Joseph Adalbert Guz (Polish: Józef Wojciech Guz), was a Polish Conventual Franciscan friar who was martyred by a Nazi guard at the Oranienburg-Sachsenhausen concentration camp (Germany), 6 June 1940. He was beatified in 1999 by Pope John Paul II.

== Biography ==
Born under the name of Joseph Adalbert Guz on 18 March 1890 in Lemberg, Austria (present-day Lviv, Ukraine), he entered the Franciscans in 1908, where he took the name of Innocent. After studying Philosophy in Kraków, he was ordained a priest in 1914 on the eve of the First World War. He then ministered in various parishes and communities, and then went to Grodno. There he became acquainted with the father Maximilian Kolbe and entered the Mission of the Immaculate, founded by the latter, to become a confessor and professor from 1933 to 1936.

During the occupation of 1939, while the USSR occupied the East and the German Reich the West of Poland, he was transferred to Grodno. He was then arrested and imprisoned on 21 March 1940, by the Soviets who put in place a policy of anti-Christian repression. He escaped and went to the German zone where he was arrested by the Gestapo. He was transferred to Soldau concentration camp and then to Oranienbourg-Sachsenhausen concentration camp. After he arrived at the camp, he was beaten to death by a guard on 6 June 1940.

Considered one of the hundred and eight Polish martyrs of the Second World War, he was beatified on 13 June 1999 by Pope John Paul II in Warsaw.
