= Antonin Bajewski =

Polish Roman Catholic Franciscan friar and martyr

Bajewski around 1940

Antonin Bajewski (17 January 1915 – 18 May 1941), born Jan Eugene Bajewski, was a Polish Franciscan friar. He has been declared a martyr by the Catholic Church following his death in Auschwitz Concentration Camp in 1941 and was beatified as one of the 108 Martyrs of World War II by the Polish Pope John-Paul II on 13 June 1999. Their collective feast day is 12 June.

== Life ==
He was born in Vilnius in 1915. He became a Franciscan in 1934, taking the name Brother Antonin. He was ordained a priest in 1939 and became vicar to Maximilian Kolbe. He and Kolbe were both arrested by the Germans in 1941 and Antonin was imprisoned. He boosted the other prisoners' morale and gave them his rations, before being deported to Auschwitz Concentration Camp, where he contracted typhoid fever. This proved fatal and he died on 18 May 1941.

== Bibliography ==
- (in Polish) Marek Darul, Błogosławiony ojciec Antonin Bajewski, Wydaw. Duszpasterstwa Rolników, 2001 ISBN 8388743198, 9788388743191, 63 pages.
