= Józef Czempiel =

Polish activist, Roman Catholic priest, and martyr

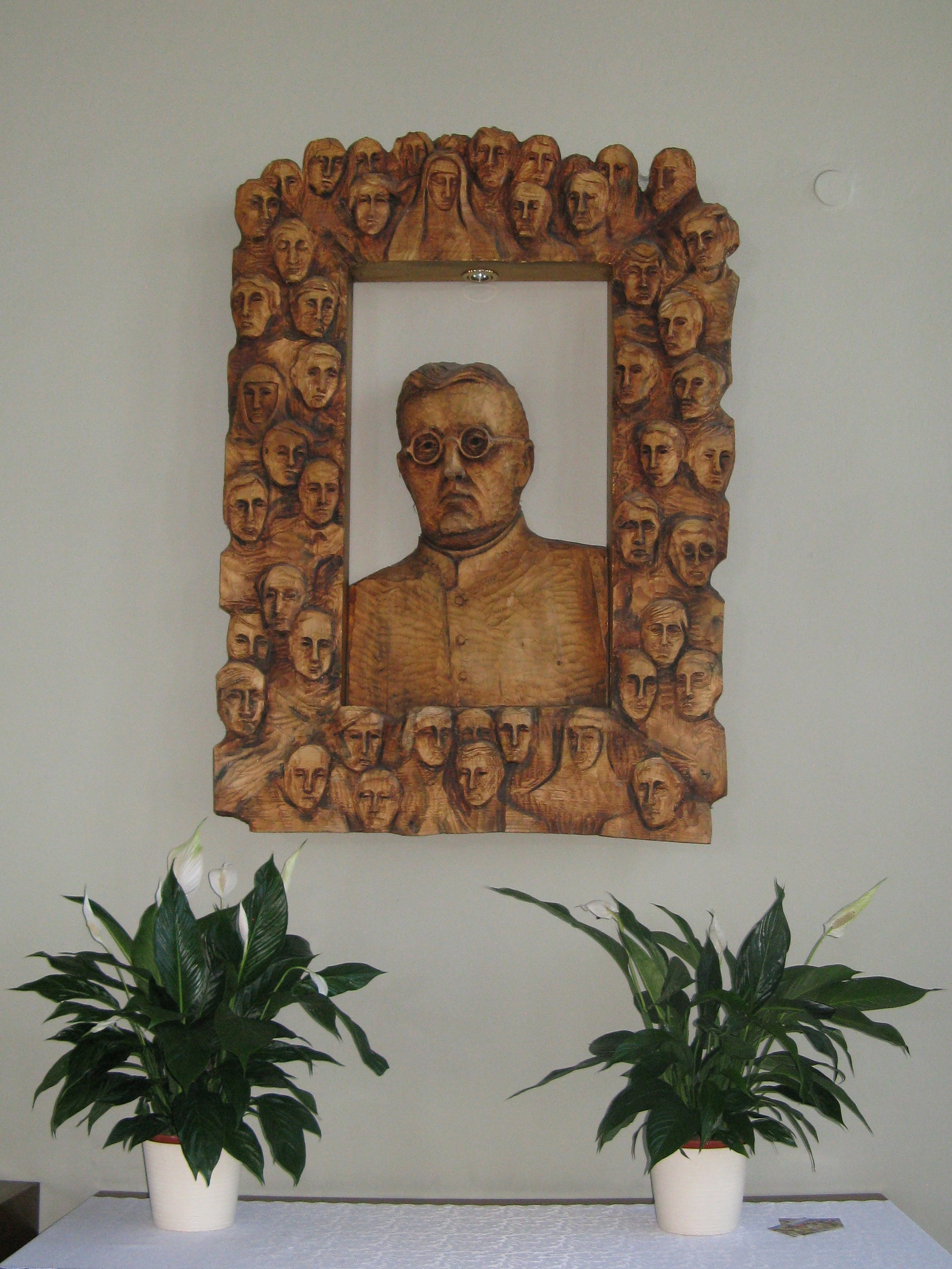
Jozef Czempiel altar

Józef Czempiel (born 21 September 1883 in Piekary Śląskie – 4 May 1942) was a Polish Roman Catholic priest, activist. He was murdered in Dachau concentration camp.

On 13 June 1999, Czempiel was among 108 Polish martyrs of World War II, beatified in Warsaw by Pope John Paul II.
