= Edward Kaźmierski =

Polish resistance fighter and Roman Catholic martyr

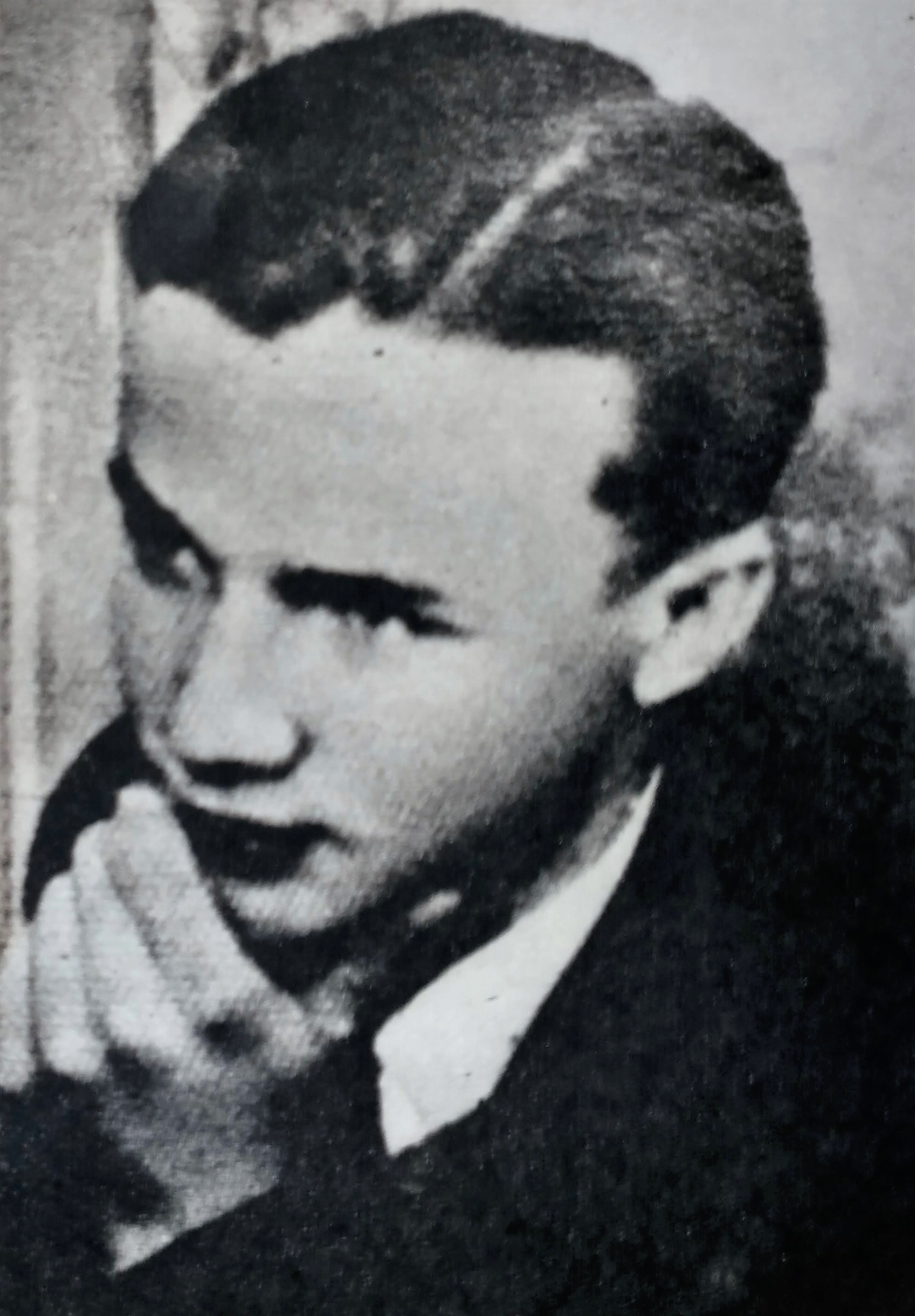
Edward Kaźmierski

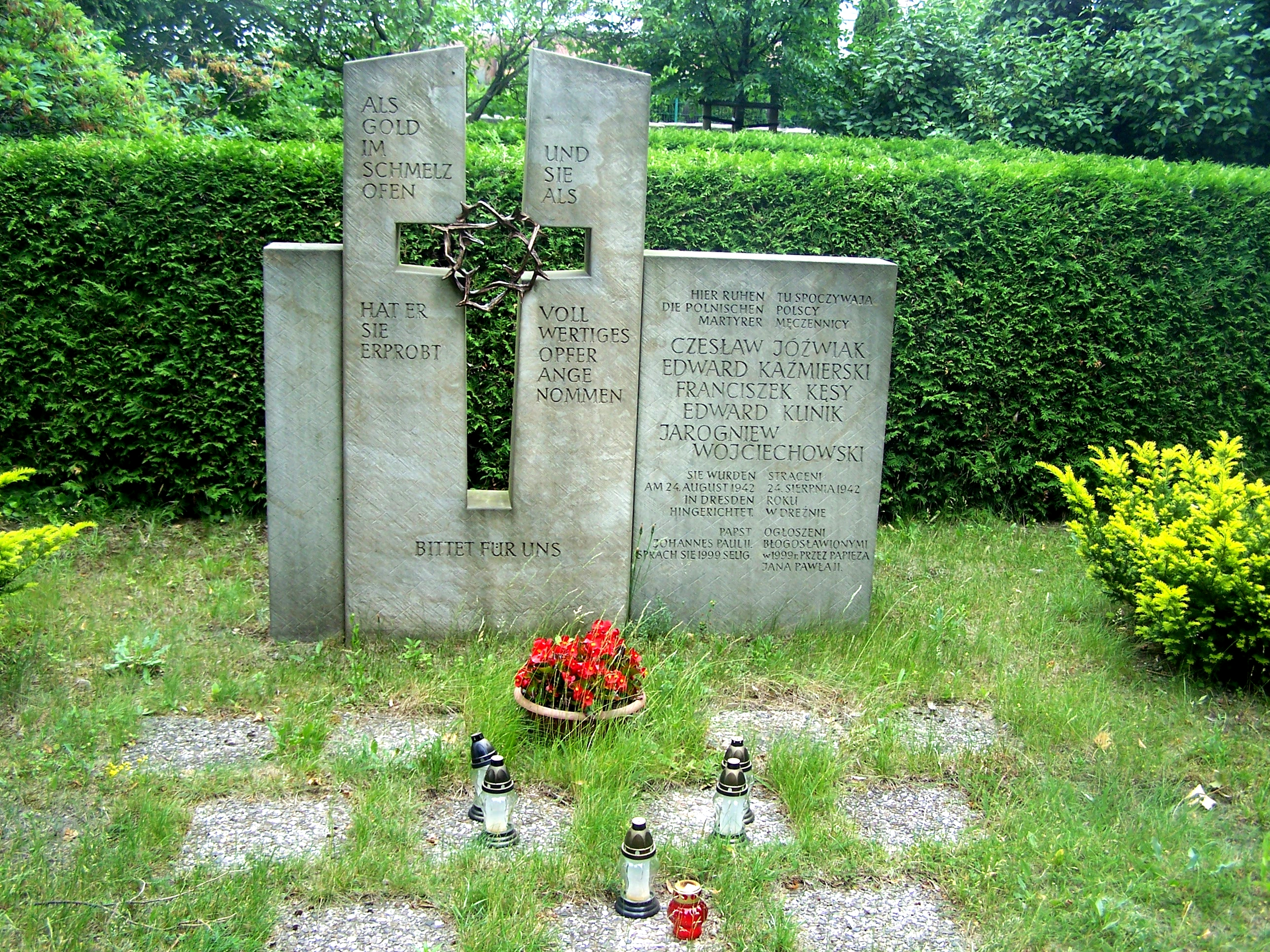
Memorial in Dresden, 2012

Edward Kaźmierski (1 October 1919 – 24 August 1942) was a Polish Roman Catholic anti-Nazi resistance fighter. He was born in Poznan. He was one of the "Poznań Five", who were guillotined in a prison in Dresden for their spiritual work and resistance against the Nazi occupation. He is one of the 108 Martyrs of World War II who were beatified by Pope John Paul II in 1999.

== Bibliography ==
- Marian Orłoń, Wierni do końca, Łódź Wydawnictwo Salezjańskie: nakł. Salezjańskiej Inspektorii św. Stanisława Kostki, 1984
- Polska edycja Il Bollettino Salesiano - Magazyn Salezjański Don Bosco nr 7-8/2002

== See also ==
- The Holocaust in Poland
- World War II casualties of Poland
