= Ludwik Mzyk =

Polish Roman Catholic priest and martyr

Blessed Ludwik Mzyk S.V.D.
- Born: 22 April 1905; Königshütte, Silesia Province, Kingdom of Prussia, German Empire
- Died: 20 February 1940 (aged 34); Fort VII (KL Posen), Poznań, Reichsgau Wartheland, German Reich (now Poland)
- Venerated in: Roman Catholic Church
- Beatified: 13 June 1999, Poland by Pope John Paul II
- Feast: February 23

Ludwik Mzyk (22 April 1905 – 20 February 1940) a priest of the Society of the Divine Word (SVD) and one of the 108 Blessed Polish Martyrs beatified on 13 June 1999 by Pope John Paul II in Warsaw, Poland.

== Life ==
He was born to a mining and deeply religious family in Chorzów. Ludwik was an altar boy from a young age. In September 1918, he entered the minor seminary of the Divine Word Missionaries at the Holy Cross House in Nysa. His father died when Ludwik was still at Holy Cross. In order to help his mother financially Ludwik, together with his brother, worked in a mine during his summer holidays.

In 1926, he entered St. Augustin novitiate near Bonn, and professed his religious vows in 1928. He then completed his theological studies in Rome, where, on 30 October 1932, he was ordained a priest. In 1935, he graduated with a degree of theology and was sent back to Chorzow to be novice master at the SVD mission house. When the war was about to begin, he encouraged the youth about spirituality and selfless dedication to Christ. In 1939, he was made rector.

The Gestapo invaded Poland and on 25 January 1940 Mzyk was arrested. On 1 February he was interned at Cell 60 in Fort VII (makeshift concentration camp) in Poznań. On the night of 20 February 1940 Mzyk was beaten and then dragged outside the fort, where he was shot in the head by Junior Officer Dibus. (Dibus would be later killed by a distant relative of Mzyk who joined with the Americans in attacking Berlin.) His body was never recovered and thought to be dumped in an unmarked mass grave.

== Sources ==
Divine Word Missionaries History and Tradition, Blessed Fr. Ludwik Mzyk SVD
