= Henryk Hlebowicz =

Belarusian Roman Catholic priest and martyr (1904 – 1941)

Blessed Henryk Hlebowicz
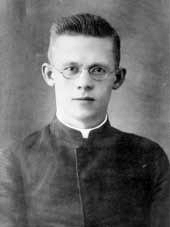

Priest & Martyr
- Born: 1 July 1904; Grodno
- Died: 9 November 1941 (aged 37); Barysaw
- Beatified: 13 June 1999, Warsaw by Pope John Paul II

Henryk Hlebowicz (1 July 1904 – 9 November 1941) was a Polish Roman Catholic priest. Born in Grodno, he served as a parish priest and lecturer at Vilnius University between 1930 and 1935. After the outbreak of World War II, he engaged in pastoral work while also working with partisan organizations. He was executed at Barysaw in 1941, and was beatified as one of the 108 Martyrs of World War II in 1999.

== Biography ==
Hlebowicz was born in Grodno to Franciszek and Jadwiga Hlebowicz (née Chreptowicz). He first received education at a private school in Grodno; in 1912, after his father's exile, he moved to Orenburg, where he would obtain his matura.

Returning to Grodno in August 1921, Hlebowicz would enter into the Vilnius St. Joseph Seminary, completing his studies there in 1924. He was then sent to study at the Catholic University of Lublin, where he was ordained a priest on 20 February 1927 by Marian Leon Fulman. In 1928, he received a doctorate in theology from the Catholic University of Lublin through his dissertation, Jedność Kościoła Chrystusowego według św. Jana Chryzostoma. After being sent to Rome, he received a further doctorate in philosophy from the Pontifical University of Saint Thomas Aquinas in 1929 after defending his dissertation, De substantialitate animae.

Returning to Vilnius, Hlebowicz served as vicar of the Church of All Saints. He was then assigned Church of St. Francis and St. Bernard, also serving as a lecturer in logic, criticism and ontology at St. Joseph Seminary. In 1930, he was appointed a lecturer of fundamental theology at Vilnius University. He resigned in September 1935, stating that he "did not want to be a politician" and that he wanted to focus on pastoral work. He was promptly assigned to Trakai, though he had to resign in July 1939 due to health issues. While receiving treatment in Rabka, he served as the prefect of a girls' gymnasium.

At the outbreak of World War II, Hlebowicz returned to Vilnius, engaging in pastoral work while also cooperating with and serving as chaplain for partisan organizations (including the Home Army in Vilnius) under the pseudonym Bolesław Szewik (or "bolszewik", for short). In September 1941, he went to Aktsyabr, where he engaged in further pastoral work, introducing bilingual services and preaching sermons in Russian and Polish. After his residence was searched, he was summoned to Plyeshchanitsy by Belarusian police; he was then taken to Barysaw on 9 November, where he was shot and killed.

Hlebowicz was beatified on 13 June 1999 by Pope John Paul II as one of the 108 Martyrs of World War II.

== See also ==
- The Holocaust in Poland
- World War II casualties of Poland
