= Antoni Zawistowski =

Polish Roman Catholic priest and martyr

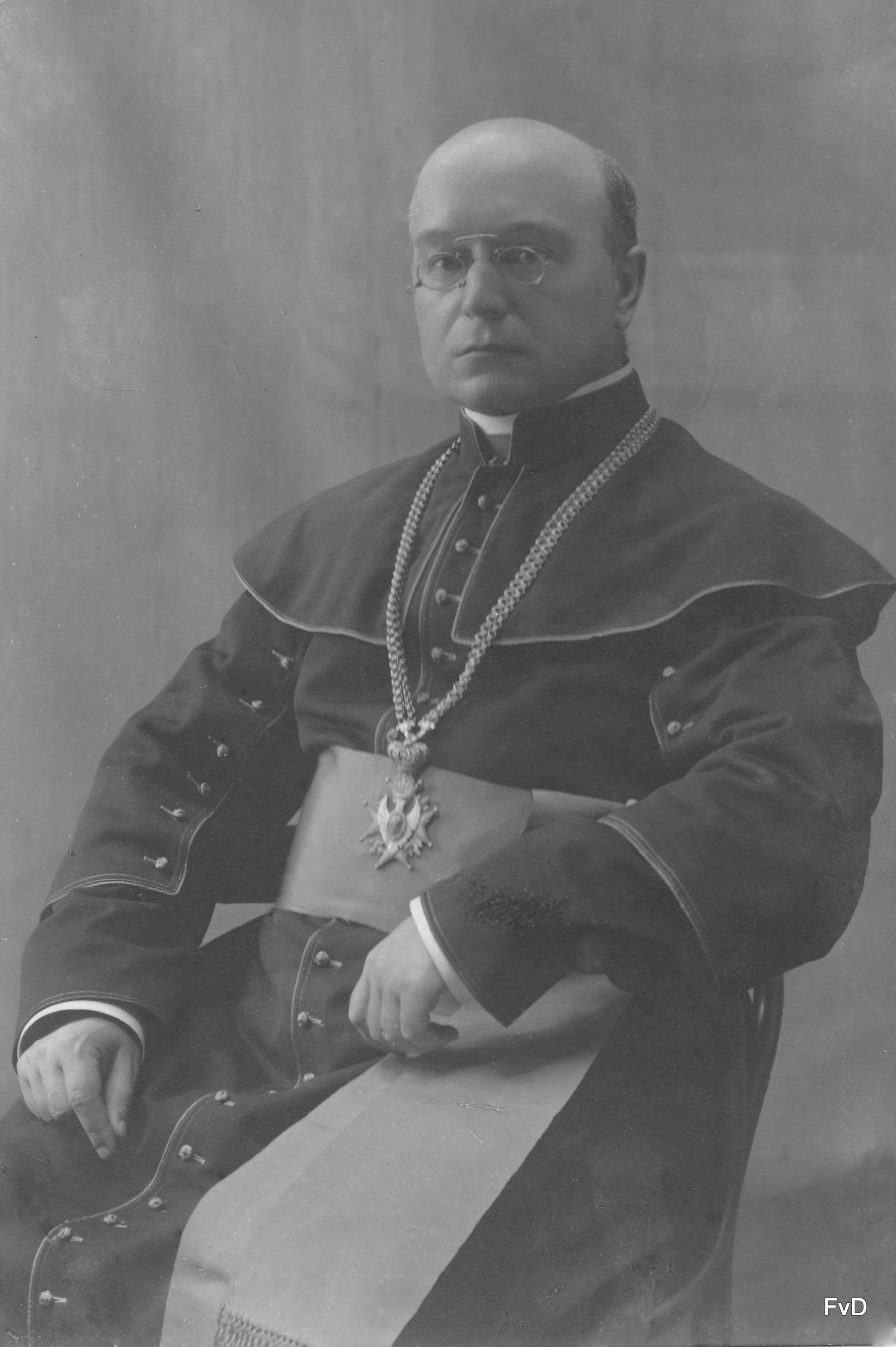

Blessed Antoni Zawistowski (1882–1942) was a Polish priest. He died in a Nazi concentration camp. He is one of the 108 Martyrs of World War II. He was beatified by Pope John Paul II as one of 108 Polish Martyrs of World War II.

== See also ==
- List of Nazi-German concentration camps
- The Holocaust in Poland
- World War II casualties of Poland

== Sources ==
- Prions en Église, n° 258, p. 16 (Éditions Bayard)
