= Stanisław Kubista =

Polish Roman Catholic priest and martyr

Blessed Stanislaw Kubista S.V.D.
- Born: 27 September 1898; Kostuchna, Poland
- Died: 26 April 1940 (aged 41); Sachsenhausen Concentration Camp
- Venerated in: Roman Catholic Church
- Beatified: 13 June 1999, Poland by Pope John Paul II
- Feast: 26 April

Stanislaw Kubista (27 September 1898 – 26 April 1940) was a Society of the Divine Word (SVD) martyr. He was beatified by Pope John Paul II on 13 June 1999 as one of the 108 Polish Martyrs of World War II.

== Life ==
Stanisław Kubista was born on 27 September 1898 in Kostuchna near Mikołów in the present diocese of Katowice to Stanisław and Franciszka Czempska. He was the fifth child out of six sons and three daughters. His father was a forester, who worked a leased farm. His older sister Anna entered a convent in Vienna. Stanislaw was an altar boy at the local parish church. His interested in missions was prompted at an early age by a priest of the Society of the Divine Word from Nysa who was a frequent visitor and brought copies of the "Stadt Gottes" magazine.

Kubista was noted for his eagerness to learn. He attended the primary school in Kostuchno, where the obligatory language was German; at home he learned to read and write in Polish. He was graduated in 1912 and entered the Divine Word minor seminary at Nysa, where he was a quiet and zealous student.

At the outbreak of World War I many of the seminary buildings and rooms were made available for the military. Kubista's eldest brother, Paweł, died on the Belgian front in 1914. In 1917, he was sent to the French Front to serve as a radio and telegraph operator. After the armistice, his garrison was moved to Szczecin, from where he was released in May 1919.

In 1927, after years of gruelling training, and suffering to become a priest, he was ordained. During his schooling in the seminar, he was noted to be a good writer; especially in the Polish language. In 1928, he was appointed sub rector of Gorna Grupa (where later on, fellow martyr Aloysius Liguda would be the main rector). He later realized that life was everywhere, it was all around him. Until 27 October 1940, the priest wrote stage plays and publication, as well as procuring things needed for the community and for the people in the seminary.

On 27 October 1939, the house was captured and was made into an internment camp, which stranded the people until 5 February 1940. On 9 April 1940, Kubista and Ligura parted their ways when Ligura was taken to Dachau concentration camp and Kubista was taken to Sachsenhausen concentration camp. While en route, he caught cold which turned into pneumonia and he also suffered from what was called colitis. Still, he was beaten and starved. On 26 April 1940, the officer in charge of the barracks entered Kubista's cell and said "You have nothing to live for!" The officer then stepped on his chest with one foot and put the other foot on his throat with enough force to break his collarbone. Stanisław Kubista then convulsed and died minutes later. He was buried in an unknown mass grave.
