= Society of the Divine Word =

Catholic missionary religious congregation

- Societas Verbi Divini (Latin)
- Logo

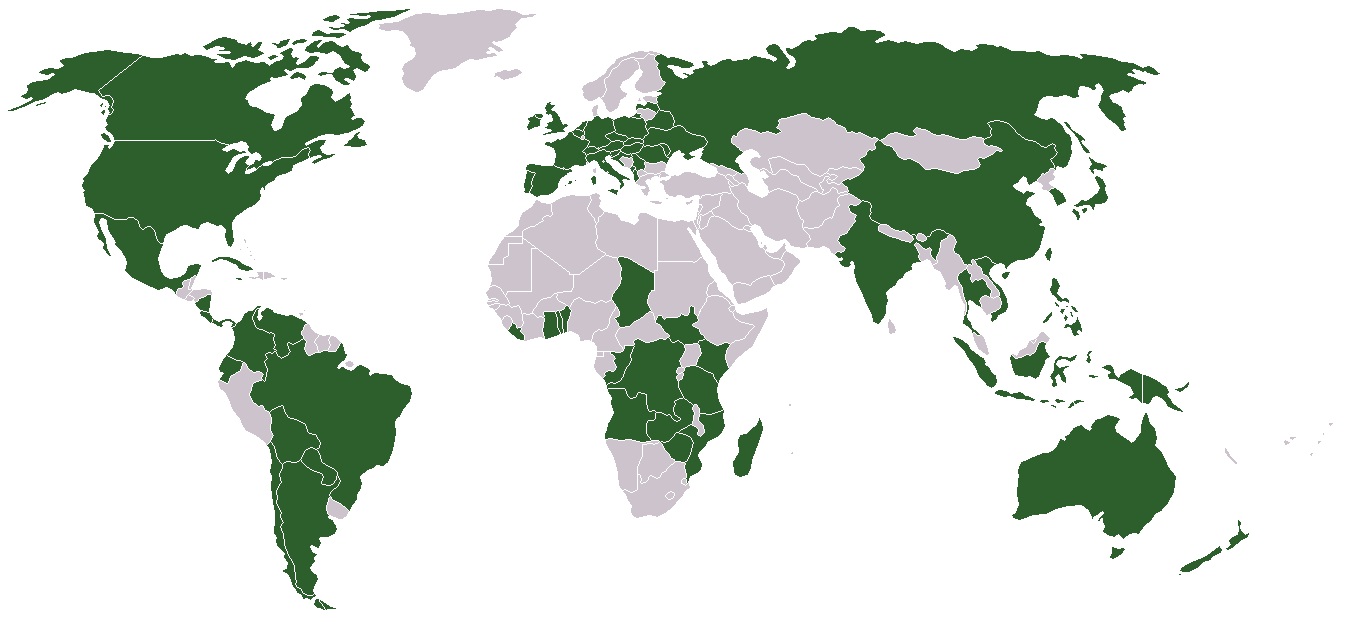
- Location of countries where SVD serves
- Abbreviation: SVD (post-nominal letters)
- Nickname: Verbites
- Formation: September 8, 1875; 151 years ago
- Founder: Arnold Janssen
- Founded at: Steyl, Venlo, Netherlands
- Type: Clerical Religious Congregation of Pontifical Right (for Men)
- Headquarters: General Motherhouse; Via dei Verbiti 1, C.P. 5080, 00154 Rome, Italy
- Members: 5,965 (Male religious, includes 4,120 Priests) as of 2020
- Superior General: Anselmo Ricardo Ribeiro
- Ministry: Educational and missionary works
- Continent served: Asia-Pacific, Africa, Europe, Americas
- Parent organization: Roman Catholic Church
- Website: svdmissions.org

The Society of the Divine Word (Latin: Societas Verbi Divini), popularly called the Verbites or the Divine Word Missionaries, and sometimes the Steyler Missionaries, is a Catholic clerical religious congregation of pontifical right for men. As of 2020, it consisted of 5,965 members composed of priests and religious brothers working in more than 70 countries, now part of VIVAT international. It is one of the largest missionary congregations in the Catholic Church. Its members add the postnominal letters SVD. The superior general is Anselmo Ricardo Ribeiro, who hails from Brazil.

== History ==
The Society was founded in Steyl in the Netherlands in 1875 by Arnold Janssen, a diocesan priest, and drawn mostly from German priests and religious exiles in the Netherlands during the church-state conflict called the Kulturkampf, which had resulted in many religious groups being expelled and seminaries being closed in Germany.

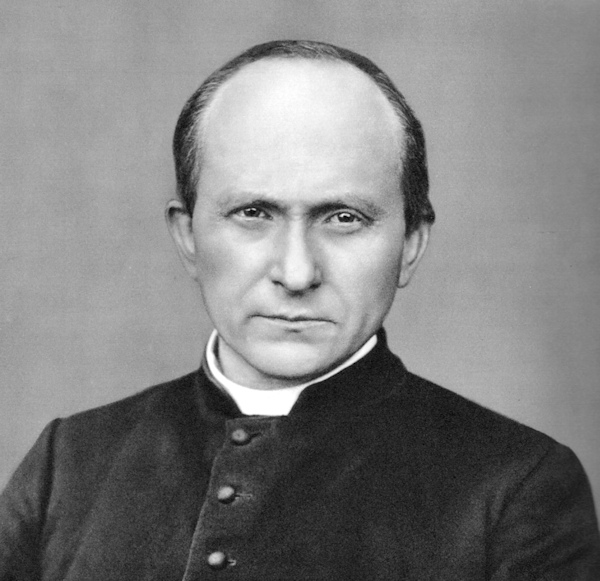
Arnold Janssen (1837–1909), founder of the Society of the Divine Word

In 1882, the Society started sending missionaries into China’s Shandong Province, where their aggressive methods were part of the chain of events that led to the Boxer Uprising in the late 1890s. In 1892, missionaries were sent to Togo, a small country in west Africa. The Togo mission was particularly fruitful, for 15 years later the Holy See had appointed an Apostolic prefect. The Society's third mission was to German New Guinea (the northern half of present-day Papua New Guinea). A mission was also opened in Paraguay.

In the 20th century the Society further expanded, opening communities in Australia, Botswana (Gaborone, Gumare and Ghanzi); Brazil; Canada (Quebec and Ontario); Indonesia; South Africa (Phalaborwa, Polokwane and Pretoria); the United States of America (Appalachia and Illinois); and Zambia (Kabwe, Livingstone, and Lusaka). Additional European communities were established in Austria (Bischofshofen near Salzburg and Vienna); the Netherlands (Tegelen); Rome; the United Kingdom and in the Silesian area in Poland (where Mirosław Piątkowski invented in 1994 a new devotion, the Chaplet of the Holy Spirit and His Seven Gifts).

The Society operates Nanzan University in Nagoya.

== Saints and other titles ==
Saints

- Arnold Janssen (5 November 1837 – 15 January 1909), founder of the Society, canonized on 5 October 2003
- Joseph Freinademetz (15 April 1852 – 28 January 1908), founder of the Society, canonized on 5 October 2003

Blesseds

- Stanislaw Kubista (27 September 1898 – 26 April 1940), priest martyred under the Nazi Occupation of Poland, beatified on 13 June 1999
- Ludwik Mzyk (22 April 1905 – 20 February 1942), priest martyred under the Nazi Occupation of Poland, beatified on 13 June 1999
- Alojzy Liguda (23 January 1898 – 8 December 1942), priest martyred under the Nazi Occupation of Poland, beatified on 13 June 1999
- Grzegorz Bolesław Frąckowiak (18 July 1911 – 5 May 1943), priest martyred under the Nazi Occupation of Poland, beatified on 13 June 1999

Servants of God

- William Finnemann (18 December 1882 – 26 October 1942), Auxiliary Bishop of Manila martyred under the Japanese Occupation of the Philippines, declared as a Servant of God on 7 December 1999
- Gabriel Wilhelmus Manek (18 August 1913 – 30 November 1989), Archbishop of Endeh and founder of the Daughters of Our Lady Queen of the Holy Rosary, declared as a Servant of God in 2023
- Jorge Novak (4 March 1928 - 9 July 2001), Bishop of Quilmes
- Marian Żelazek (30 January 1918 - 30 April 2006), priest, declared as a Servant of God on 30 May 2018

== See also ==
- List of SVD Schools
- Ralph M. Wiltgen
