= Józef Kurzawa =

Polish Roman Catholic priest and martyr

Józef Kurzawa (1910–1940) was a Polish and Roman Catholic priest. He was executed by firing squad. He is one of the 108 Martyrs of World War II who were beatified by Pope John Paul II in 1999.

== See also ==
- The Holocaust in Poland
- World War II casualties of Poland
