= World War II casualties of Poland =

Casualties of Polish citizens during World War II

Around 6 million Polish citizens (of whom 2–3 million were ethnic Poles, 3 million were Jews, and 250,000-500,000 were ethnic Ukrainians) perished during World War II: about one fifth of the entire pre-war population of Poland. Most of them were civilian victims of the war crimes and the crimes against humanity which Nazi Germany and the Soviet Union committed during their occupation of Poland. Approximately half of them were Polish Jews who were killed in the Holocaust. Statistics for Polish casualties during World War II are divergent and contradictory. This article provides a summary of the estimates of Poland's human losses in the war as well as a summary of the causes of them.

According to the Polish government's official report on war damages which was published in 1947, the total number of Poland's war dead was 6,028,000; 3.0 million ethnic Poles and 3.0 million Jews, excluding the losses of Polish citizens who were members of the Ukrainian and Belarusian ethnic groups. When the communist system collapsed, this figure was disputed by the Polish historian Czesław Łuczak who estimated that the total number of losses was 6.0 million; 3.0 million Jews, 2.0 million ethnic Poles, and 1.0 million Polish citizens who were members of the other ethnic groups whose losses were not included in the 1947 report on war damages. In 2009 the Polish government-affiliated Institute of National Remembrance (IPN) published the study "Polska 1939–1945. Straty osobowe i ofiary represji pod dwiema okupacjami" (Poland 1939-1945. Human Losses and Victims of Repression Under the Two Occupations) that estimated Poland's war dead at between 5.6 and 5.8 million Poles and Jews, including 150,000 during the Soviet occupation. Poland's losses by geographic area include about 3.5 million within the borders of present-day Poland, and about two million in the Polish areas annexed by the Soviet Union. Contemporary Russian sources include Poland's losses in the Polish areas annexed by the Soviet Union with Soviet war dead.

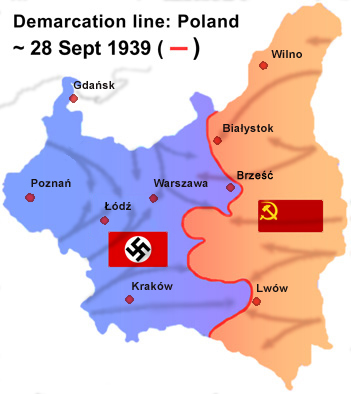
German-Soviet Partition of Poland 1939

== Causes ==
Most Polish citizens who perished in the war were civilian victims of the war crimes and crimes against humanity during the occupation by Nazi Germany and the Soviet Union. The Polish Institute of National Remembrance (IPN) estimates total deaths under the German occupation at 5,470,000 to 5,670,000 Jews and Poles, 2,770,000 Poles, 2.7 to 2.9 million Polish Jews According to IPN research there were also 150,000 victims of Soviet repression.

World War II casualties of Poland

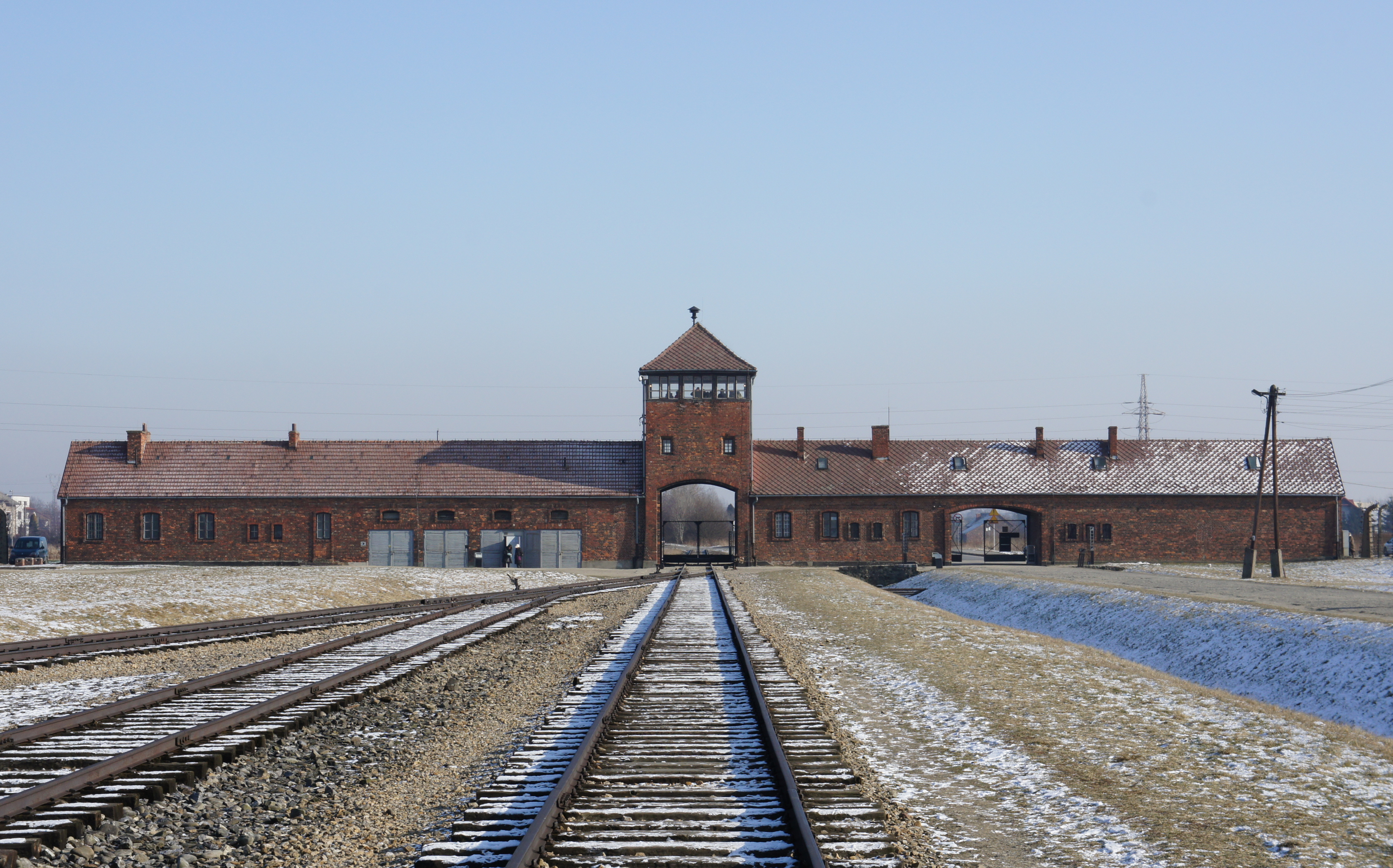
Entrance to Auschwitz-Birkenau

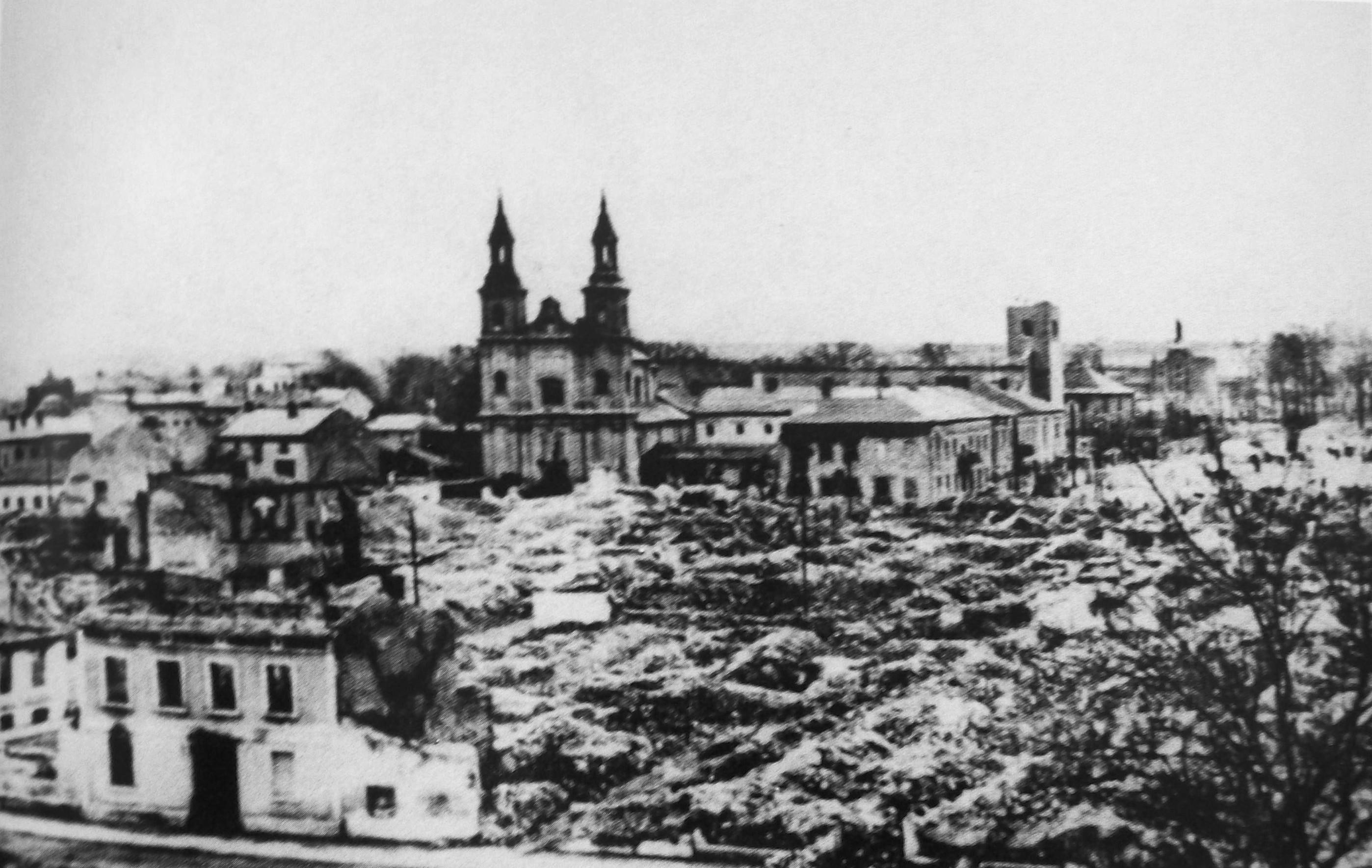
Destruction of Wieluń in 1939

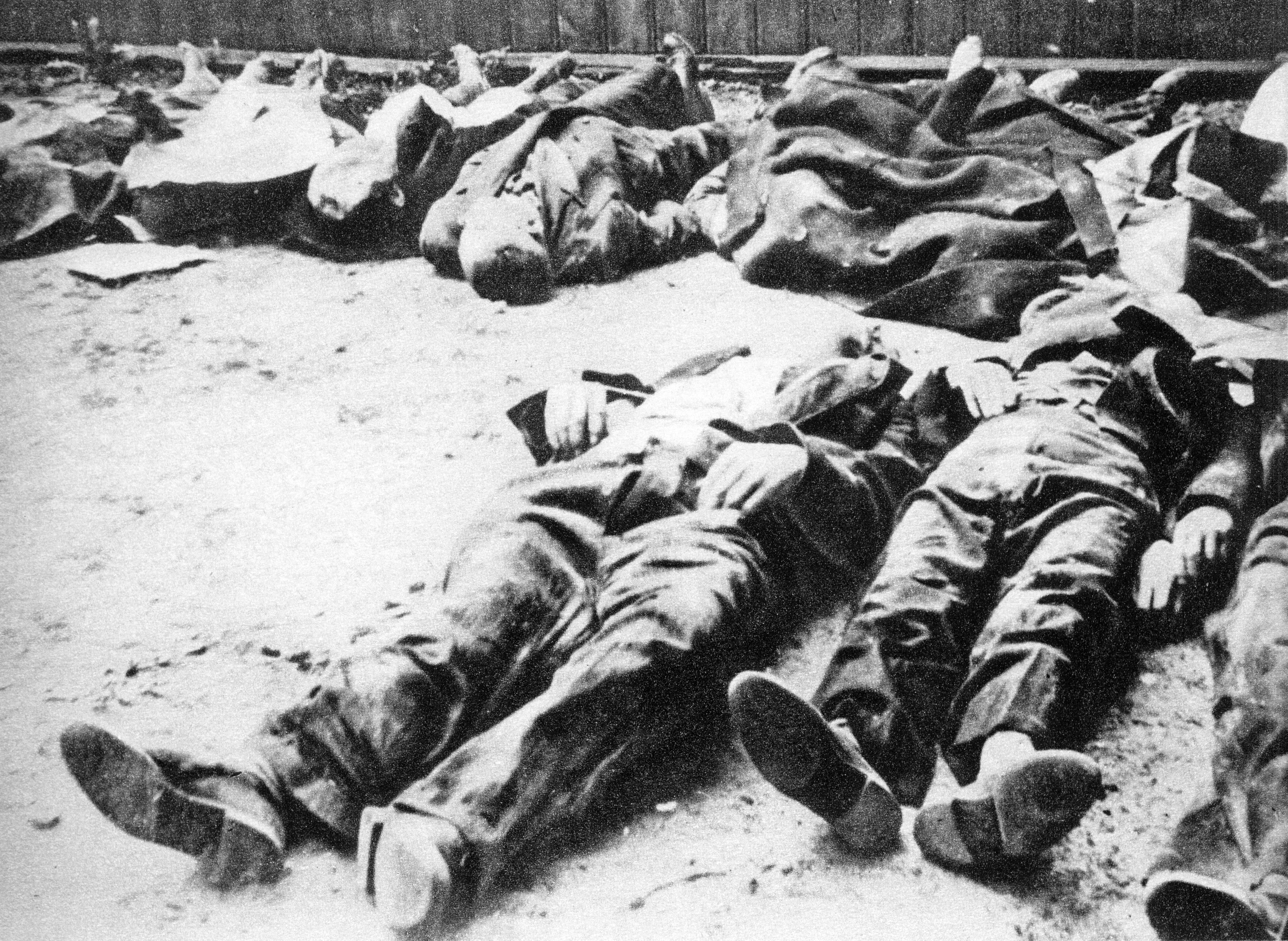
Victims of Wola Massacre

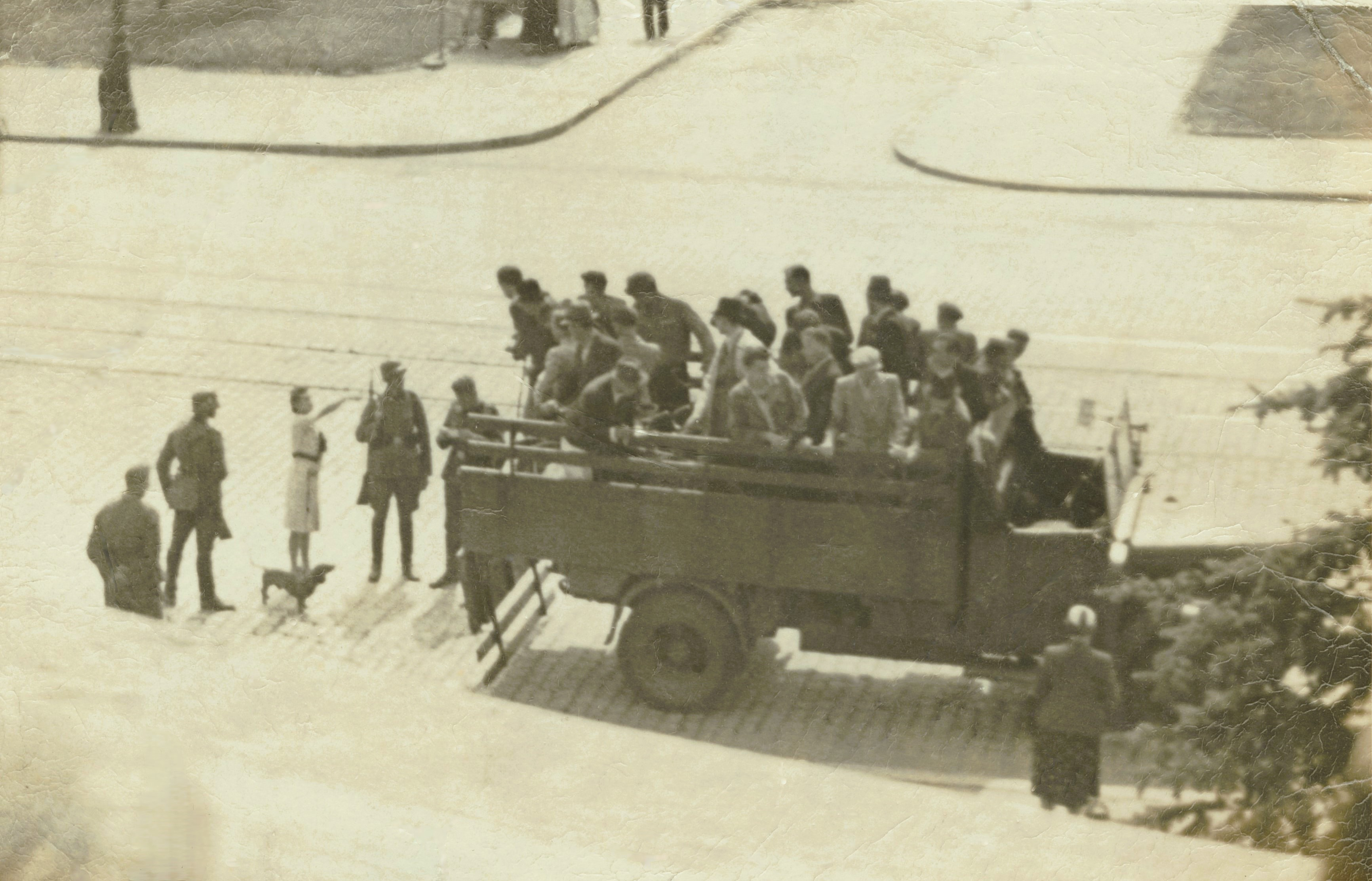
Civilians captured by German police for forced labor (Poland 1941)

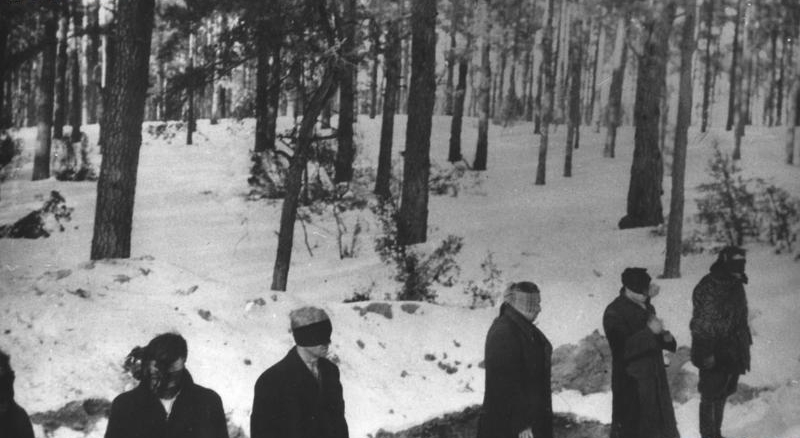
Execution at Palmiry

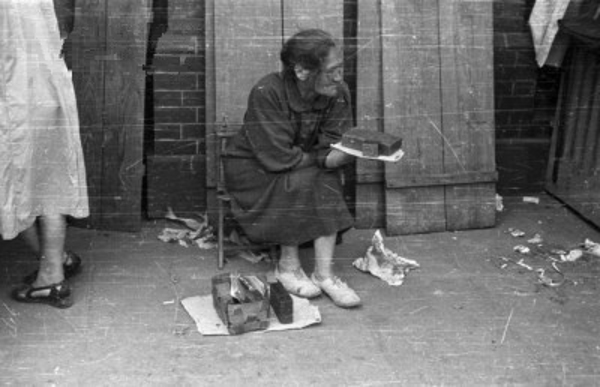
Warsaw 1944

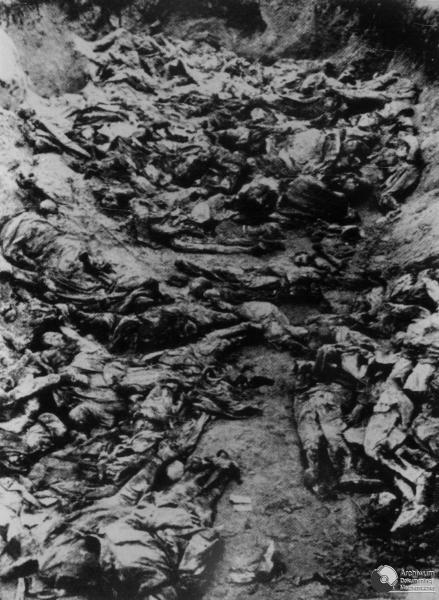
Victims of Katyn Massacre committed by NKWD

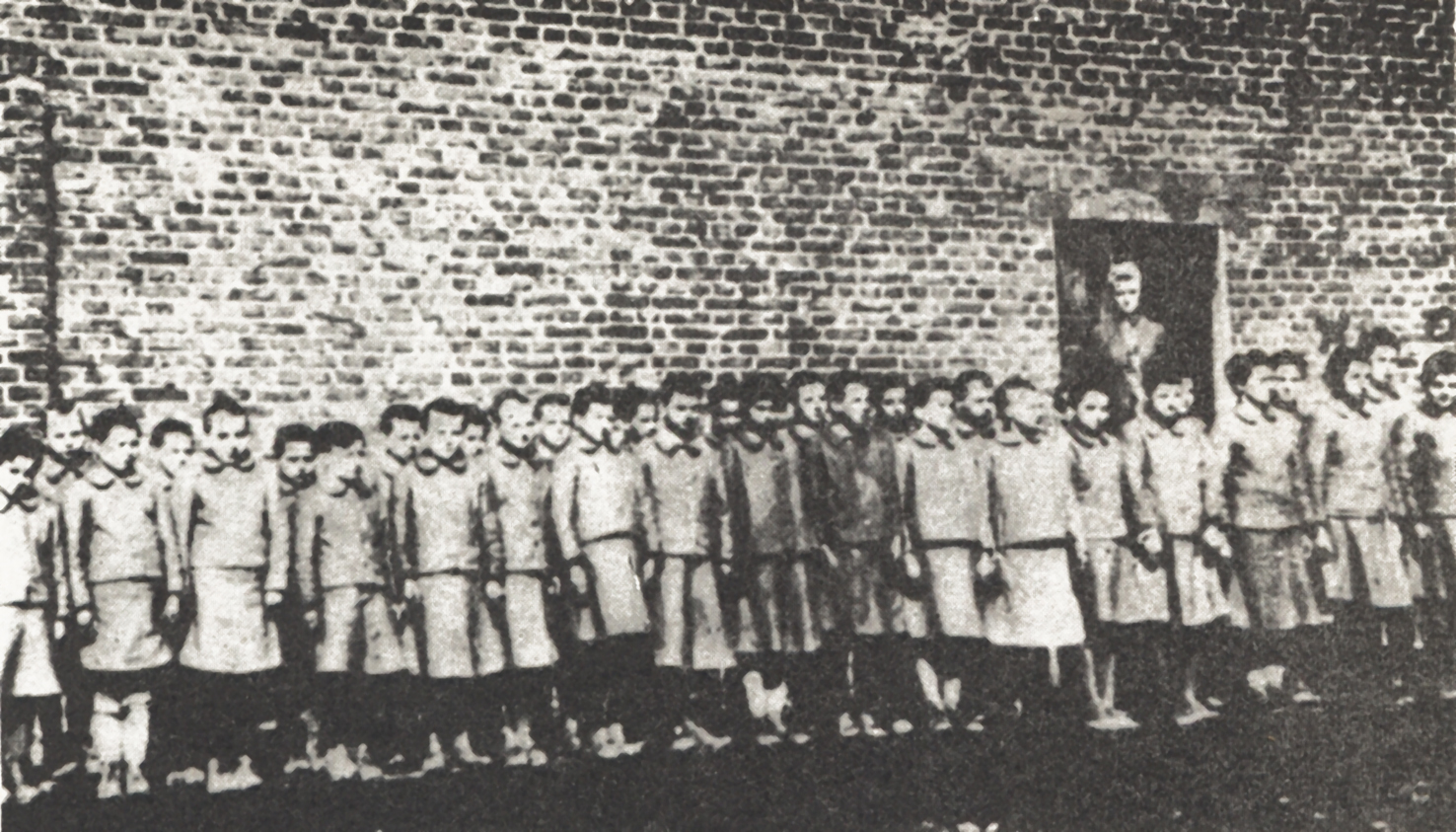
Germanization of Polish children in Nazi-German labor camp in Dzierżązna

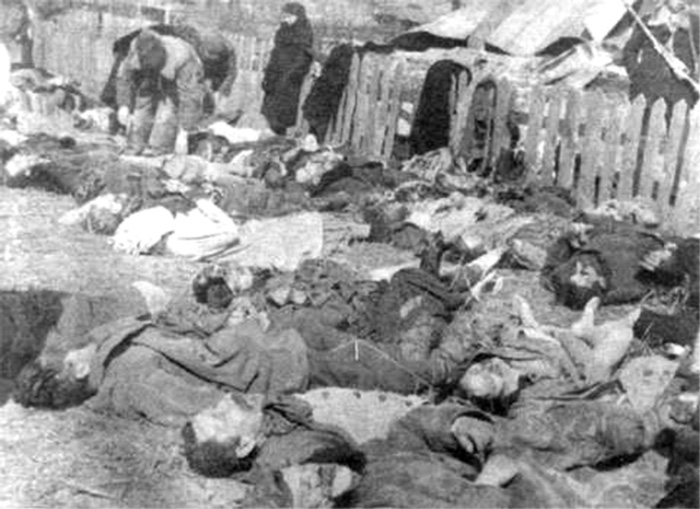
Victims of a massacre committed by the UPA in the village of Lipniki, Poland, 1943

Jewish Holocaust deaths

Approximately three million Polish Jews were victims of the Holocaust. In 2009 the Polish Institute of National Remembrance (IPN) put the total of Jewish deaths at 2.7 to 2.9 million. Polish researchers estimate that 1,860,000 Polish Jews were murdered in the Nazi death camps, the remainder perished inside the Jewish ghettos in German-occupied Poland, aboard Holocaust trains, and in mass shooting actions. The Nazi extermination camp overall death toll is estimated at 2,830,000; including 1,860,000 Polish Jews: 490,000 killed at Belzec; 60,000 at Sobibor; 800,000 at Treblinka; 150,000 at Chełmno; 300,000 at Auschwitz; and 60,000 at Majdanek. An additional 660,000 Jews from other countries, were transported to Auschwitz and murdered. Over a million Jews deported from Western countries to camps and ghettos set up in occupied Poland perished in the Holocaust. The Nazi death camps located in Poland are sometimes incorrectly described as Polish death camps.

Human Losses of the ethnic Polish population

According to the figures published by the Polish government in exile in 1941 the ethnic Polish population was 24,388,000 at the beginning of the war in September 1939. The IPN puts the death toll of ethnic Poles under the German occupation at 2,770,000 and 150,000 due to Soviet repression

The main causes of these losses are as follows.

Acts of War

- 1939 Military Campaign-About 200,000 Polish civilians were killed in the 1939 Military Campaign. Many were killed in the Luftwaffe's terror bombing operations, including the bombing of Frampol and Wieluń, bombing of Sulejów. Massive air raids were conducted on these, and other towns which had no military infrastructure. Civilians were strafed from the air with machine gun fire in what became known as a terror bombing campaign. Columns of fleeing refugees were systematically attacked by the German fighter and dive-bomber aircraft. The Siege of Warsaw (1939) caused a huge toll of civilian casualties. From the very first hours of World War II, Warsaw, the capital of Poland, was a target of an unrestricted aerial bombardment campaign by the German Luftwaffe. Apart from the military facilities such as infantry barracks and the Okęcie airport and aircraft factory, the German pilots also targeted civilian facilities such as water works, hospitals, market places and schools.
- Warsaw Uprising Between 150,000 and 250,000 Polish civilians died in the 1944 Warsaw Uprising, mostly from mass murders such as the Wola massacre.

Murdered in Prisons or Camps, and in mass executions

During the occupation many Non-Jewish ethnic Poles were killed in mass executions, including an estimated 37,000 Poles at the Pawiak prison complex run by the Gestapo. Polish researchers of the Institute of National Remembrance have estimate about roughly 800,000 ethnic Polish victims during the German occupation including 400,000 in prisons, 148,000 killed in executions and 240,000 deaths among those deported to concentration camps, including 70-75,000 at Auschwitz. During the occupation, communities were held collectively responsible for Polish attacks against German troops and mass executions were conducted in reprisal. Many mass executions took place outside prisons and camps such as the Mass murders in Piaśnica. Psychiatric patients were executed in Action T4. Farmers were murdered during pacifications of villages.

Forced Labor in Germany

Non-Jewish ethnic Poles in large cities were targeted by the łapanka policy which the German occupiers utilized to indiscriminately round up civilians off the street to be sent as forced laborers to Germany. In Warsaw, between 1942 and 1944, there were approximately 400 daily victims of łapankas. Poles in rural areas and small towns were also conscripted for forced labor by the German occupiers. According to research by the Institute of National Remembrance between 1939 and 1945, 1,897,000 Polish citizens were taken to Germany as forced laborers under inhuman conditions, which resulted in many deaths. However, Czesław Łuczak put the number of Poles deported to Germany at 2,826,500 Although Germany also used forced laborers from all over Europe, Slavs (and especially Poles and Russians) who were viewed as racially inferior, were subjected to intensified discriminatory measures. They were forced to wear identifying purple tags with "P"s sewn to their clothing, subjected to a curfew, and banned from public transportation. While the treatment of factory workers or farm hands often varied depending on the individual employer, most Polish laborers were compelled to work longer hours for lower wages than Western Europeans. In many cities, they were forced to live in segregated barracks behind barbed wire. Social relations with Germans outside work were forbidden, and sexual relations ("racial defilement") were considered a capital crime punishable by death.

Malnutrition and Disease

Prior to the war the area which became the General Government was not self sufficient in agricultural production and was a net importer of food from other regions of Poland. Despite this food deficit the German occupiers confiscated 27% of the agricultural output in the General Government, thus reducing the food available for the civilian population. This Nazi policy caused a humanitarian crisis in Poland’s urban areas. By 1940, between 20 and 25% of the population within the Government General depended on outside relief aid. Richard C. Lukas points out “To be sure, the Poles would have starved to death if they had to depend on the food rationed to them." To supplement the meager rations allocated by the Germans, Poles depended on the black market in order to survive. During the war 80% of the population’s needs were met by the black market. During the war there was an increase in infectious diseases caused by the general malnutrition among the Polish population. In 1940 the tuberculosis rate among Poles, not including Jews, was 420 per 100,000 compared to 136 per 100,000 prior to the war. During the occupation the natural death rate in the General Government increased to 1.7% per annum compared to the prewar level of 1.4%

Kidnapping of children by Nazi Germany

Part of the Generalplan Ost involved taking children from Poland and moving them to Nazi Germany for the purpose of Germanization, or indoctrination into becoming culturally German. The aim of the project was to acquire and "Germanize" children with purportedly Aryan traits who were considered by Nazi officials to be descendants of German settlers in Poland. The Institute of National Remembrance cited a source published in the People's Republic of Poland in 1960 that put the number of children kidnapped in Poland at 200,000 of whom only 30,000 were eventually returned to Poland, the others remained in post war Germany.

Soviet Repression

In the aftermath of the September 1939 German and Soviet invasion of Poland, the territory of Poland was divided between Nazi Germany and the Soviet Union (USSR). The Soviet occupied territories of Poland, with total population of 13.0 million, was subjected to a reign of terror. According to research published in 2009 by the Institute of National Remembrance about 1.0 million Polish citizens from all ethnic groups were arrested, conscripted or deported by the Soviet occupiers from 1939 to 1941; including about 200,000 Polish military personnel held as prisoners of war; 100,000 Polish citizens were arrested and imprisoned by the Soviets, including civic officials, military personnel and other "enemies of the people" like the clergy and Polish educators; 475,000 Poles who were considered "enemies of the people" were deported to remote regions of the USSR; 76,000 Polish citizens were conscripted into the Soviet Armed forces and 200,000 were conscripted as forced laborers in the interior of the Soviet Union. When the Soviet forces returned to Poland in 1944-1945 there was a new wave of repression of Polish citizens from all ethnic groups including 188,000 deported, 50,000 conscripted as forced labor and 50,000 arrested.

The Institute of National Remembrance puts the confirmed death toll due to the Soviet occupation at 150,000 persons including 22,000 murdered Polish military officers and government officials in the Katyn massacre. They pointed out that Czesław Łuczak estimated the total population loss at 500,000 ethnic Poles in the Soviet occupied regions.

Andrzej Paczkowski puts the number of Polish deaths due to Soviet repression at 90,000–100,000 of the 1.0 million persons deported and 30,000 executed by the Soviets.

According to Zbigniew S. Siemaszko the total of those deported was 1,646,000 of whom 1,450,000 were residents and refugees (excluding POWs).

According to Franciszek Proch the total of those deported was 1,800,000 of whom 1,050,000 perished.

Massacres of Poles in Volhynia and Eastern Galicia

An estimated 50,000 to 100,000 ethnic Poles were killed in an ethnic cleansing operation carried out by the Ukrainian Insurgent Army (UPA) beginning in March 1943 and lasting until the end of 1944 in the Nazi occupied Volhynia and Eastern Galicia. The Institute of National Remembrance maintains that 7,500 ethnic Ukrainians were also killed during this interethnic conflict

Losses of other ethnic minorities

The figure of 5.6 to 5.8 million war dead estimated by the IPN was for only the Jewish and ethnic Polish population. They did not provide figures for the death toll of Polish citizens from the other ethnic minorities.

Ukrainians, Belarusians and Lithuanians

According to the figures published by the Polish government in exile in 1941 there were about 7.0 million Polish citizens from ethnic minorities at the beginning of the war in September 1939, mostly Ukrainians, Belarusians, Polishchuks and Lithuanians living in the eastern regions of Poland annexed by the USSR. The IPN did not estimate the death toll of Polish citizens from these ethnic minorities. The IPN maintains that accurate figures for these losses are not available because of border changes and population transfers, according to their figures 308,000 Polish citizens from the ethnic minorities were deported into the interior of the Soviet Union and were conscripted into the Soviet armed forces. During the German occupation Polish citizens from ethnic minorities were deported to Germany for forced labor.

Ethnic Germans

In prewar Poland about 800,000 persons were identified as ethnic Germans. According to the IPN 5,437 ethnic Germans were killed in the 1939 military campaign. The IPN also puts the number of Polish citizens conscripted into the German armed forces at 250,000 of whom 60,000 were killed in action. Tens of thousands of ethnic Germans were killed during the Nazi evacuation from Poland in 1944 and 1945, and as a result of repression NKVD and Red Army or died in post war internment camps. During the war the Nazi occupiers instituted the Volksliste in the Polish areas annexed by Nazi Germany to register ethnic Germans in Poland. Many Polish citizens were pressured to sign the Volksliste in order to avoid Nazi reprisals. About 1 million persons were on Volksliste groups 1 and 2 that included Polish citizens of German descent; Volksliste groups 3 and 4 included 1.7 Polish citizens that were subject to future Germanisation. In addition 61,000 . ethnic Germans were living in the General Government. During the war 522,149 ethnic Germans from other nations were settled in Poland by the Third Reich. By 1950 670,000 ethnic Germans from prewar Poland had fled or were expelled and about 40,000 remained in Poland; about 200,000 Polish citizens who were on Volksliste groups 1 and 2 during the war were rehabilitated as Polish citizens.

== Summary of estimates ==
In 1947 the communist dominated government in Poland estimated war losses at 6.0 million ethnic Poles and Jews, they did not include the losses of Polish citizens from other minorities - Ukrainians and Belarusians. In 1951 the Polish government made a reassessment of war losses that put actual losses at 5.1 million ethnic Poles and Jews; this study was to remain secret until the communist government collapsed. In a 2009 study by the Polish government affiliated Institute of National Remembrance the total deaths of ethnic Poles and Jews were estimated at 5.6 to 5.8 million persons including 150,000 in Soviet captivity.

The Polish government estimate of war dead in 1947 was based on the results of the 1931 Polish census using the criterion of language spoken to breakout the various ethnic groups. The classification of the ethnic groups in Poland during the Second Polish Republic is a disputed topic, Tadeusz Piotrowski called the 1931 Polish census "unreliable", noting that it had underestimated the number of non-Poles The official figures for nationality from the 1931 Polish census based on the mother tongue put the percentage of ethnic Poles at 68.9%, Jews 8.6% and other minority groups 22.5%., Tadeusz Piotrowski maintains that the adjusted census figures(taking religious affiliation into account) put the percentage of ethnic Poles at 64.7%, Jews 9.8% and other minority groups 25.5% of Poland's population. Based on the analysis by Tadeusz Piotrowski roughly 1.0 million Ukrainians and Belarusians and 400,000 Polish speaking Jews were misclassified as Poles in the official figures for the 1939 population. Polish demographer Piotr Eberhardt maintains that it is commonly agreed that the criterion of declared language to classify ethnic groups led to an overestimation of the number of Poles in pre-war Poland. He notes that in general, the numbers declaring a particular language do not mesh with the numbers declaring the corresponding nationality. Members of ethnic minority groups believe that the language criterion led to an overestimation of Poles.

=== Reports, studies and assessments ===
==== Polish Bureau of War Damages ====
In April 1947 the Polish government Bureau of War Damages (BOW) published an analysis of Poland's war losses. This study was prepared for a conference on war reparations from Germany. Their figure of 6,028,000 Polish war dead has been cited in historical literature since then.

Poland Bureau of War Damages (BOW). Statement on war losses and damages of Poland in 1939–1945.
Total Population of ethnic Poles and Polish Jews (only) in 1939 ^{A.}	27,007,000	
Causes of human losses (% of total)		%
Direct war operations ^{B.}	644,000	10.7%
Murdered in the extermination camps, executions, liquidation of ghettos	3,577,000	59.3%
Prisons, concentration camps, epidemics, extenuation, bad treatment	1,286,000	21.3%
Outside the camps : because of extenuation, wounds, injuries, beatings, hard labour	521,000	8.7%
Total number of war losses ^{C.}	6,028,000	100.0%
Notes provided in the report: A. Population of 27,007,000 includes only ethnic Poles & Jews; Polish citizens of national minorities (Ukrainians, Belarusians) and Germans are not included.: Population of 27,007,000 includes 5,193,000 Poles and Jews in the Polish areas annexed by the Soviet Union.; B. Figure of 644,000 deaths caused by direct war operations includes 123,000 military casualties. C. Total deaths of 6,028,000 includes about 3,000,000 Jews.: In addition to the above losses there was a decrease of 1,215,000 births.; Criticism of 1947 Report of Polish Bureau of War Damages C. Since the fall of communism the Polish historian Czesław Łuczak maintained that the figure 6.0 million war dead is not correct because in January 1947 the communist dominated government in Poland pressured the Bureau of War Damages to come up with a figure of war losses to present at a conference on war reparations from Germany even though they had incomplete information at that time. A subsequent 1951 study by the Polish Ministry of Finance found actual losses to be about 5.1 million persons.Timothy Snyder maintains that the figure of six million Polish war dead was generated in 1946 for domestic political purposes by the Stalinist regime. He believes that a figure 4.8 million "is probably closer to the truth", including non Jewish losses of one million due to German and 100,000 to Soviet repression and one million due to "mistreatment and as casualties of war"

==== Polish Ministry of Finance ====
The Polish government Ministry of Finance in 1951 prepared a study to investigate and detail Poland's war losses in order to document claims for war reparations from Germany. This study was to remain secret and not published until after the collapse of communism in Poland. The Ministry of Finance estimated actual losses at 5,085,000 persons, 943,000 less than the Polish government Bureau of War Damages(BOW) report of 1947. According to Ministry of Finance figures losses were 5,085,000 persons (1,706,700 Poles and 3,378,000) Jews

According to Assessments and Estimates: an Outline by Mateusz Gniazdowski: "This discrepancy was explained by demographers who maintained that the (BOW) included the "missing" category in the total population loss figure, based on the statistics of the end of 1945, while many people believed to have been dead either returned to the country, or remained abroad as emigres. It was not until 1950 that the war – or war related – population migrations were over, in demographic terms."

The 1951 Report by Polish Finance Ministry
Cause of death (Poles & Jews)	Number	%
Acts of War	550,000	10.7%
Murdered intentionally	3,000,700	57.3%
Victims of prisons and concentration camps	1,083,000	21.3%
Victims of forced labor	274,000	5.4%
Exhaustion	168,000	3.3%
Total	5,075,700	100.0%
Source: Wojciech Materski and Tomasz Szarota. Polska 1939–1945. Straty osobowe i ofiary represji pod dwiema okupacjami. Institute of National Remembrance (IPN) Warszawa 2009 ISBN 978-83-7629-067-6 Page 15 (There was no explanation given for the difference of 9,300 between this schedule and the total losses of 5,085,000 persons in the description of the Ministry of Finance Report, see above)

==== Kazimierz Piesowicz ====
In 1987 the Polish Academy of Sciences journal Studia Demograficzne published an article by Kazimierz Piesowicz that analyzed the demographic balance from Poland from 1939-1950.

Poland's Population Balance (1939–1950)

Description	Total	Poles	Jews	Germans	Others (Ukrainians /Belarusians)
Population 1939 (by Nationality) ^{A.}	35,000,000	24,300,000	3,200,000	800,000	6,700,000
Natural Increase 1939–1945 ^{B.}	1,300,000	1,000,000			300,000
Total Human Losses ^{C.}	(6,000,000)	(3,100,000)	(2,800,000)		(100,000)
War Emigration ^{D.}	(1,500,000)	(500,000)	(200,000)	(600,000)	(200,000)
Border Changes USSR ^{E.}	(6,700,000)	(700,000)			(6,000,000)
Population gain Recovered Territories ^{F.}	1,100,000	1,100,000	0	0	0
Re-Immigration 1946–50 ^{G.}	200,000	200,000	0	0	0
Deportations to USSR 1944-1947 ^{H.}	(500,000)		0	0	(500,000)
Natural Increase 1946–1950 ^{I.}	2,100,000	2,100,000	0	0	0
Population 1950 ^{J.}	25,000,000	24,400,000	200,000	200,000	200,000
Note: The number in parentheses indicates a negative amount (a negative balance); Source of figures: Kazimierz Piesowicz, Demograficzne skutki II wojny swiatowej Studia Demograficzne, No. 1/87, 1987. 103-36 pp. Warsaw Legend: A. Population as of 1939. – In this analysis the nationality of the population is by the primary language spoken, not by religion. Most Jews spoke Yiddish, however included with the Poles are about 200,000 Polish speaking Jews who are classified with the Polish group. Included with the Poles are 1,300,000 Eastern Orthodox & Greek Catholic adherents who are sometimes classified with the Ukrainian and Belarusian groups B. Natural Increase October 1939-December 1945 -After the war Polish demographers calculated the estimated natural population growth that occurred during the war. This figure is the net total of actual births less the total of deaths by natural causes from October 1939-December 1945. C. Kazimierz Piesowicz put the total war dead at 6.0 million. He also notes that all the figures are approximated. D. War Emigration Polish citizens who remained abroad after the war. E. Border Changes USSR The number of Polish citizens who remained in the USSR after the war estimated by Kazimierz Piesowicz. F. Population gain Recovered Territories Germans remaining in Poland after the war in the Recovered Territories. This group included 1,100,000 German nationals who declared their allegiance to Poland. G. Re-immigration 1946-50 Poles resident in western Europe before the war, primarily in Germany and France, who returned to Poland after the war H. Deportations to USSR 1944-1947-Forced resettlement of Ukrainians and Belarusians to the USSR. I. Natural Increase 1946-1950 This is the official Polish government data for births and natural deaths from January 1946 until the census of December 1950. J. Population December 1950 Per Census The total population per the December 1950 census was 25 million.

==== Franciszek Proch ====
Franciszek Proch was a Polish lawyer and journalist. During the war he was imprisoned at the Dachau concentration camp. In the post war era he resided in Germany and the United States. Proch published Poland's Way of the Cross in 1987 in which he estimated Poland's war dead. The estimates of Franciszek Proch were cited by Tadeusz Piotrowski in his book Poland's Holocaust

Description	Population (Poles&Jews)	Military Losses	Civilian Losses (Non-Jewish)	Civilian Losses (Jewish)	Total Losses	% Population
Poland	28,400,000					
Under German Occupation		295,000	2,345,000	2,400,000	5,040,000	17.7%
Under Soviet Occupation		65,000	885,000	100,000	1,050,000	3.7%
Total Losses		360,000	3,320,000	2,500,000	6,090,000	21.4%
Source of figures: Franciszek Proch, Poland's Way of the Cross, New York 1987 Pages 143-144 Details provided by Franciszek Proch: Population includes 25.0 million Poles and 3.4 million Jews.; Jewish Losses- 2.4 million victims of Nazis and 100,000 of Soviet Terror. 32,000 Jews died in Polish military.; Victims of Soviet Terror- 1,800,000 deported and 750,000 released; 1,050,000 dead (15,000 Katyn; 565,000 in Labor camps; 220,000 Missing; 150,000 Died since 1955; 100,000 unaccounted for)

==== Czesław Łuczak ====
Czesław Łuczak was a Polish historian, and Rector of the Adam Mickiewicz University from 1965 to 1972, from 1969 to 1981 and from 1987 to 1991; director the University's Institute of History. He was a member of the Polish United Workers' Party in communist Poland.

Łuczak authored Polska i Polacy w drugiej wojnie światowej (Poland and Poles in the Second World War). In a section on the demographic losses he presented estimated losses with some brief observations. The figures are Łuczak's estimates.

Estimated total losses by Czesław Łuczak	Number of casualties
During German Occupation of Poland	5,100,000
Direct War Operations (not including Warsaw Uprising)	450,000
Subtotal	5,500,000
Outside Polish Territory	500,000
Other Countries	2,000
Total	6,000,000
Sourced from: Wojciech Materski and Tomasz Szarota. Polska 1939–1945. Straty osobowe i ofiary represji pod dwiema okupacjami.: Losses during the German occupation of Polish territory were 5.1 million persons.; Losses due to direct war operations, not including Warsaw Uprising were 450,000 persons.; Losses outside Polish territory were 500,000 persons. This figure includes forced labor in Germany as well as in the USSR. Losses in the USSR included mass executions and the deaths of those persons deported and resettled in the USSR.; Total Polish War losses were 6 million persons.

Czesław Łuczak also authored an article in the Polish academic journal Dzieje Najnowsze Rocznik, titled Szanse i trudnosci bilansu demograficznego Polski w latach 1939–1945 (Possibilities and Difficulties of the Demographic Balance in Poland 1939-1945), pages 9–14:

Estimated losses by Czesław Łuczak	Number of casualties by ethnic group
Ethnic Polish Victims During German Occupation	1,500,000
Ethnic Polish victims in Polish areas annexed by the Soviet Union	500,000
Jewish Victims During German Occupation	2,900,000
Losses of Other Ethnic Groups	1,000,000
Total	5,900,000 to 6,000,000
Source: Wojciech Materski and Tomasz Szarota. Polska 1939–1945. Straty osobowe i ofiary represji pod dwiema okupacjami.: A summary of the main points in Łuczak's article are as follows.; The 1947 Report of the Polish Bureau of War Damages considered only Poles and Jews in the 1939 population, other minorities were not included with the losses.; The Polish Bureau of War Damages report of 1947 put Jewish losses at 3.4 million; in a subsequent report to the United Nations this figure was 3.2 million Jewish dead, thus reducing the total to 5.8 million.; Actual losses of Ethnic Poles in the Polish areas annexed by the Soviet Union was about 500-800,000 persons. Reports published in the west estimating these losses at 1.5 million Poles in Soviet hands is not based on reliable evidence.; Losses of Ethnic Poles in the Massacres of Poles in Volhynia and Eastern Galicia range from a few thousand up to several hundred thousand persons, occasionally 200,000. The figure of 500,000 deaths mentioned by Lech Wałęsa is not based on reliable evidence.; The estimates for losses of the Jewish population in the Holocaust range from 2.7 million to 3.4 million persons.; Łuczak estimated total losses at 6.0-5.9 million Polish citizens, not less than the report of the Polish Bureau of War Damages. This figure includes 2.9 million Jews, 2.0 million Ethnic Poles and 1.0 million from national minorities the Ukrainian and Belarusian ethnic groups which were not included in the 1947 Polish government figure of 6.0 million war dead. Total losses in the Polish areas annexed by the Soviet Union were 2.0 million persons including 500,000 Ethnic Poles.; Łuczak estimated total losses of Ethnic Poles due to the German occupation at 1.5 million persons; 1.3 million in occupied Poland and 200,000 as forced laborers in Germany. Łuczak maintains the demographic evidence points to overall losses of 1.5 million Ethnic Poles under the German occupation.; Łuczak maintains total overall losses of Ethnic Poles and Jews at about 5.0 million persons, 1.0 million less than the 1947 report of the Polish Bureau of War Damages.

==== Tadeusz Piotrowski ====
Thaddeus Piotrowski is a Polish-American sociologist. He is a Professor of Sociology in the Social Science Division of the University of New Hampshire at Manchester. Piotrowski's assessment in 1998 of Polish war losses is that "Jewish wartime losses in Poland are estimated to be in the 2.7-2.9 million range. (Many Polish Jews found refuge in the Soviet Union and other countries.) Ethnic Polish losses are currently estimated in the range of 2 million. (The number is probably higher if we add all those who died at the hands of the Ukrainian Nationalists.)"

Comparative Poland's War Dead estimated by Tadeusz Piotrowski in 2005 presented on the Project in Posterum website,

Description	Total population	War Dead
Ethnic Poles	22,700,000	2,000,000
Jews	3,400,000	3,100,000
Other Minorities	9,000,000	500,000
Total	35,100,000	5,600,000

Causes of Poland's War Dead estimated by Tadeusz Piotrowski in 2005 on Project in Posterum website,

Causes of War Dead	Estimated number
German Occupation	5,100,000
Soviet Occupation	350,000
Massacres of Poles in Volhynia and Eastern Galicia	100,000
Total	5,600,000

==== Kazimierz Bajer ====
An analysis of Poland's war losses by Kazimierz Bajer was published in the journal of the veterans of the Armia Krajowa. Bajer calculated the estimated population losses of the 12 million ethnic Poles over the age of 15 who were capable of resistance during the German and Soviet occupation. Bajer's figures were used by Polish government affiliated Institute of National Remembrance (IPN) to estimate the war dead of the ethnic Polish population.

Calculation of Population Capable of Resistance
Total Population September 1939 ^{A.}	35,339,000
Less population Not Ethnic Polish ^{B.}	10,951,000
Ethnic Polish Population ^{C.}	24,388,000
Less losses 1939 Campaign ^{D.}	849,000
Less population Not Capable of Resistance ^{E.}	11,526,000
Population Capable of Resistance-October 1939	12,013,000
Source of figures: Bajer, Kazimierz Zakres udziału Polaków w walce o niepodległość na obszarze państwa polskiego w latach 1939–1945, "Zeszyty Historyczne Stowarzyszenia Żołnierzy Armii Krajowej", (Kraków) 1996 Pages 10–13 A. Population of 35.339 million includes about 240,000 in Polish annexed Trans-Olza area around Český Těšín. B. Population not ethnic Polish includes 2,916,000 Jews. C. Ethnic Polish population includes 435,000 Polish speaking Jews. D. Population Losses 1939 Campaign- Bajer estimated that 69% of the 1,230,000 human losses in Sept. 1939 were Poles. (Total 849,000: Killed 296,000; Prisoners of War 449,000; emigrated from Poland (Sept./Oct 1939) 104,000). The IPN put the 1939 war dead at 360,000. E. Population Not Capable of Resistance(100% ages 1–14; 50% ages 15–19; 30% women 20-39; 100% over 70 years and 632,000 disabled)

Losses of Ethnic Polish Population Capable of Resistance
Population Capable of Resistance Oct 1939	12,013,000
Less war Dead 1944–1945 ^{C.}	170,000
Add return of Wounded soldiers	70,000
Less deported to USSR	663,000
Less conscripted in Soviet Armed Forces	76,000
Less conscripted in German Armed Forces	200,000
Less conscripted for Work USSR	250,000
Less Forced Labor in Germany	1,897,000
Less entered on Volksliste ^{D.}	815,000
Less arrested in USSR	150,000
Less prisoners in Concentration Camps	138,000
Less murdered ^{A./B.}	506,000
Less deaths In Prisons & Camps ^{A./B.}	1,146,000
Less deaths Outside of Prisons & Camps ^{A./B.}	473,000
Less murdered in Eastern Regions ^{B.}	100,000
Less invalids	530,000
Subtotal of net losses	7,044,000
Total population Capable of Resistance-May 1945	4,969,000

Source of figures: Bajer, Kazimierz Zakres udziału Polaków w walce o niepodległość na obszarze państwa polskiego w latach 1939–1945, "Zeszyty Historyczne Stowarzyszenia Żołnierzy Armii Krajowej", (Kraków) 1996 Page 14

A. Bajer uses the 1947 Bureau of War Damages figures as the base to compute his estimate of ethnic Polish war dead.

B. Figure included by IPN in total ethnic Polish war dead of 2,770,000

C. The IPN put the war dead in 1944/45 at 183,000.

D. According to Bajer's calculations the number of Polish citizens on the Volksliste was 2,224,000. (200,000 were conscripted into the German Armed Forces, 937,000 were ethnic Germans, 272,000 were Poles involved in the Polish resistance and 815,000 were not involved in the resistance movement.)

==== Institute of National Remembrance ====
The Polish government affiliated Institute of National Remembrance (IPN) in 2009 estimated total war dead at between 5,620,000 and 5,820,000 persons. They did not provide a detailed population balance showing how the figures were derived. They did however breakout the figures of the total war dead.

Description	Human Losses
Ethnic Poles Deaths -German Occupation	2,770,000
Polish Jews	2,700,000 to 2,900,000
Victims of Soviet Repression	150,000
Total War Dead	5,620,000 to 5,820,000
Source: Wojciech Materski and Tomasz Szarota. Polska 1939–1945. Straty osobowe i ofiary represji pod dwiema okupacjami. Institute of National Remembrance (IPN), Warszawa 2009, ISBN 978-83-7629-067-6. Page 9

Losses of Ethnic Poles during German occupation per year.

Description Losses	1939/40	1940/41	1941/42	1942/43	1943/44	1944/45	Total
Direct War Losses	360,000					183,000	543,000
Murdered	75,000	100,000	116,000	133,000	82,000		506,000
Deaths In Prisons & Camps	69,000	210,000	220,000	266,000	381,000		1,146,000
Deaths Outside of Prisons & Camps		42,000	71,000	142,000	218,000		473,000
Murdered in Eastern Regions						100,000	100,000
Deaths other countries							2,000
Total	504,000	352,000	407,000	541,000	681,000	270,000	2,770,000
Source: Wojciech Materski and Tomasz Szarota. Polska 1939–1945. Straty osobowe i ofiary represji pod dwiema okupacjami. Institute of National Remembrance (IPN), Warszawa 2009, ISBN 978-83-7629-067-6. Page 30: The Institute of National Remembrance (IPN) figures are taken from the study by Kazimierz Bajer Zakres udziału Polaków w walce o niepodległość na obszarze państwa polskiego w latach 1939–1945, which is detailed above. The IPN noted that Bajers study was an attempt to calculate the overall losses of ethnic Poles. The authors of the (IPN) report point out that the figure of 2,770,000 deaths during the German occupation should be treated with caution. They maintain that it is difficult to obtain accurate information on the exact number and causes of Poland's losses. They hope that ongoing projects in Poland will be able to provide more accurate information in the future.; Figure of 2,770,000 Poles does not include 100,000 victims of massacres in Volhynia and Eastern Galicia.; The Institute of National Remembrance (IPN) puts the confirmed death toll due to the Soviet occupation at 150,000, they pointed out that Czesław Łuczak based on a population balance estimated the total population loss at 500,000 ethnic Poles in the Soviet occupied regions.; By June 2009 the Institute of National Remembrance (IPN) was able to confirm the information regarding 1.5 million of the total estimated 5.8 million war dead. In 2012 the Institute of National Remembrance was able to identify 3,474,449 victims and those persons persecuted under the German occupation

==== United States Holocaust Memorial Museum ====
The United States Holocaust Memorial Museum believes that "The Nazi terror was, in scholar Norman Davies's words, "much fiercer and more protracted in Poland than anywhere in Europe." Reliable statistics for the total number of Poles who died as a result of Nazi German policies do not exist. Many other Poles were victims of the 1939-1941 Soviet occupation of eastern Poland and the deportations of Poles to Central Asia and Siberia. Records are incomplete, and after the war, Soviet control of Poland and the concealment of Soviet archives impeded independent scholarship for 50 years. The changing borders and the ethnic composition of Poland as well as the vast movements of populations both during and after the war also complicated the task of calculating losses In the past, many estimates of losses were based on a Polish report dated 1947 in which reparations were requested from the Germans; this often cited document tallied population losses of 6 million for all Polish "nationals" (Poles, Jews, and other minorities). Subtracting 3 million Polish Jewish victims, the report claimed 3 million non-Jewish victims of the Nazi terror, including civilian and military casualties of war. According to the USHMM, "Documentation remains fragmentary, but today scholars of independent Poland believe that 1.8 to 1.9 million Polish civilians (non-Jews) were victims of German Occupation policies and the war."

== Military casualties ==
Poland lost a total of about 140,000 regular soldiers killed and missing. The Polish resistance movement lost an additional 100,000 fighters during the war.

The official Historical Journal of the Polish military has published statistics on Polish military casualties. The following schedule details these losses. The Polish contribution to World War II included the Polish Armed Forces in the West, and the 1st and 2nd Polish Army fighting under Soviet command.

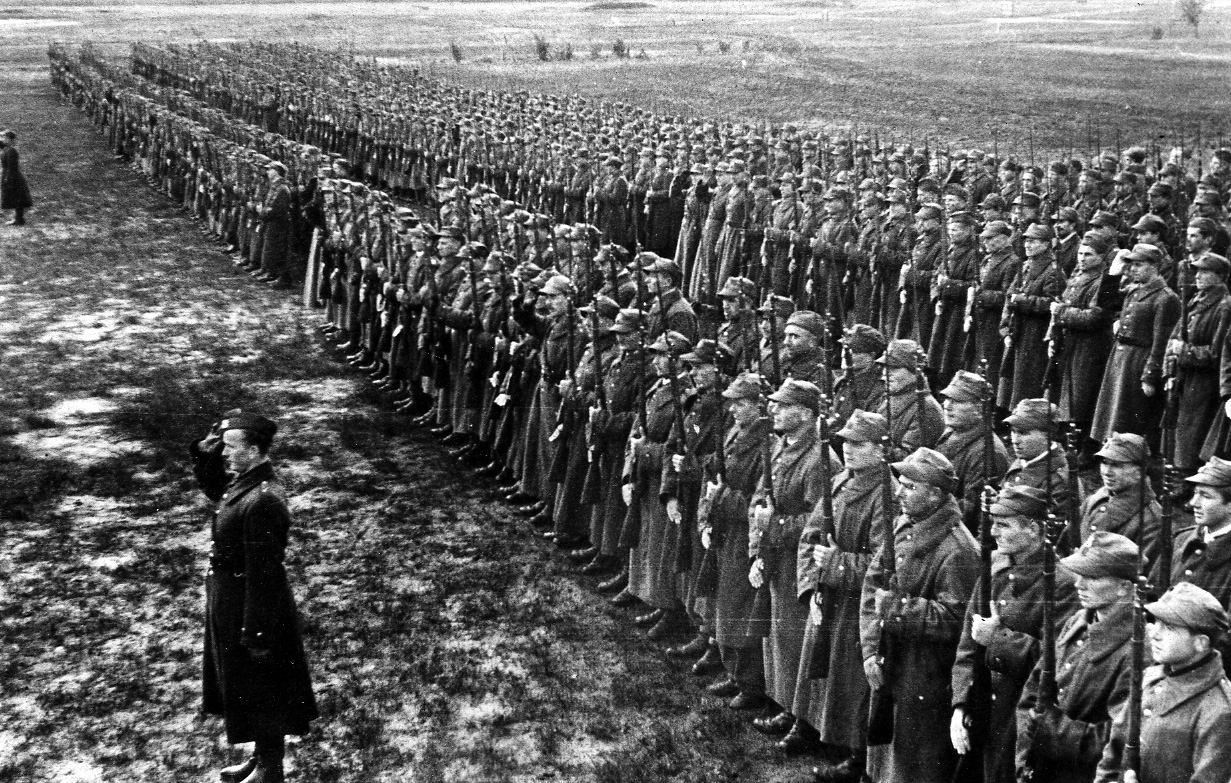
Forces of Polish Anders Army in Russia 1942

Description	Killed	Wounded	Missing	Prisoners of War	Total
Campaign Poland 1939	95-97,000	130,000		650,000	876,000
Free Polish Forces	33,256	42,666	8,548	29,385	113,855
Warsaw Uprising (Resistance forces)	18,000	25,000			60,443
Total	146,256 to 148,256	197,666	8,548	697,500	1,050,298

Wojciech Materski and Tomasz Szarota. Polska 1939–1945. Straty osobowe i ofiary represji pod dwiema okupacjami. Institute of National Remembrance (IPN), Warszawa 2009, ISBN 978-83-7629-067-6. Page 20

T. Panecki, Wysiłek zbrojny Polski w II wojnie światowej, pl:Wojskowy Przegląd Historyczny 1995, nr 1-2, s. 13,18.

- The figure of 95-97,000 killed in the 1939 campaign includes 17-19,000 in Soviet hands as POW.
- The Armia Krajowa resistance movement which had a strength of about 400,000 fighters in 1944 lost 100,000 killed in the struggle against the German occupation and 50,000 imprisoned by the Soviet Union at the end of the war.

== Polish casualties in English language sources ==
Estimated figures for World War II casualties are divergent and contradictory. The authors of the Oxford Companion to World War II maintain that "casualty statistics are notoriously unreliable". The following is a list of published statistics for Polish casualties in World War II.

- Encyclopedia Britannica article "World Wars" (2010) Military-killed, died of wounds or in prison-123,718; wounded-236,606; prisoners or missing 420,760; civilian deaths due to war 5,675,000. Estimated total deaths 5,800,000.
- I. C. B. Dear, Oxford Companion to World War II (2005) Military losses- 123,000 Civilian losses- 4,000,000 Total losses- 4,123,000.
- World War II Desk Reference (2004). Military losses-123,000 estimated. Civilians killed 6,000,000.
- Spencer C. Tucker, Encyclopedia of World War Two (2004) Battle deaths 320,000; wounded 530,000; missing in action 420,760. Civilians dead 3,000,00.
- Clodfelter, Micheal. Warfare and Armed Conflicts – A Statistical Reference (2002) Total military dead all causes 597,320 including battle deaths of 123,178; wounded 766,606. Civilian deaths 5,675,000 including 3,000,000 Jews
- John Keegan, Atlas of the Second World War (1997)-Military dead 850,000 (169,822 as allies); civilian dead 5,778,000.
- World War Two: Nation by Nation (1995) Military dead approx. 480,000 including (125,000 killed in battle, 30,000 POW in Soviet hands and 200,000 in German hands, 80,000 Polish resistance and 35,000 in German armed forces.) Civilian dead 5,300,000 including 2,900,000 Jews.
- John Ellis, World War II: A Statistical Survey (1993) 1939– 66,300 killed & 133,700 wounded, W. Europe 4,500 killed & 13,000 wounded, with Russians at least 40,000 killed & wounded Civilians 4,800,000 killed in camps plus c. 500,000 other dead
- Alan Bullock (1992) – Military dead 123,000 and 6,000,000 civilian dead (including 2,900,000 Jews).
- Rudolph Rummel (1997)- Military dead 320,000. Democide 5,788,000 including:Nazi Democide- 5,400,000 (2,365,000 Poles, 3,000,000 Jews and 35,000 Gypsies.) Soviet Democide 1939-1945 328,000. Democide by Ukrainian nationalists 60,000.
- Wars and War-Related Deaths 1700-1987 (1987)- Total deaths 6,600,000 -military 600,000; civilians 6,000,000,
- Melvin Small and J. David Singer (1982), Military dead 320,000.
- Quincy Wright (1965), Deaths (military 64,000; civilians 2,064,000).
