= Polish–Czech Forum =

Polish–Czech Forum / Czech–Polish Forum (Polish: Forum Polsko-Czeskie / Czesko-Polskie Forum; Czech: Polsko-české forum / Česko-polské forum) – a bilateral instrument of public diplomacy, established in 2009 to strength co-operation between Poland and the Czech Republic.

== Creation ==
It was created on the basis of a memorandum signed in 2008 in Prague by foreign ministers Karel Schwarzenberg and Radoslaw Sikorski. They pledged to spend 100,000 euros (each) annually to support non-governmental initiatives in Polish-Czech relations. In 2009 the councils of the forum were established and the first grants were awarded. In May 2010 the work of the forum was extended for an indefinite period.

== Format ==
Every year, the Polish Foreign Minister announces a grant competition in which non-governmental organizations, associations, foundations, universities, research institutes and non-profit organizations - in collaboration with partner institutions from the Czech Republic - can apply for funding initiatives and projects designed to stimulate the further development and strengthening of the Polish-Czech relations. The Ministry of Foreign Affairs of the Czech Republic announces an equivalent grant competition.

In Poland, the council of the forum, appointed by the foreign minister for a 2-year term, gives its opinions on applications. The first chairman of the Polish council was Eugeniusz Smolar. In November 2013 he was succeeded by Mateusz Gniazdowski, deputy director of the Centre for Eastern Studies. In parallel, the Council of the Czech-Polish Forum, appointed by the Czech Minister of Foreign Affairs, operates in the Czech Republic. Professor Josef Jařab has been the chairman of the Czech council since 2009. Both councils meet once a year at a joint meeting.

== Historical background ==
The Forum continues the tradition of cooperation between independent dissident groups in non-democratic times before the changeover of 1989, which culminated in the activities of the Polish–Czech–Slovak Solidarity movement.
