= Mirosław Jasiński =

Polish diplomat

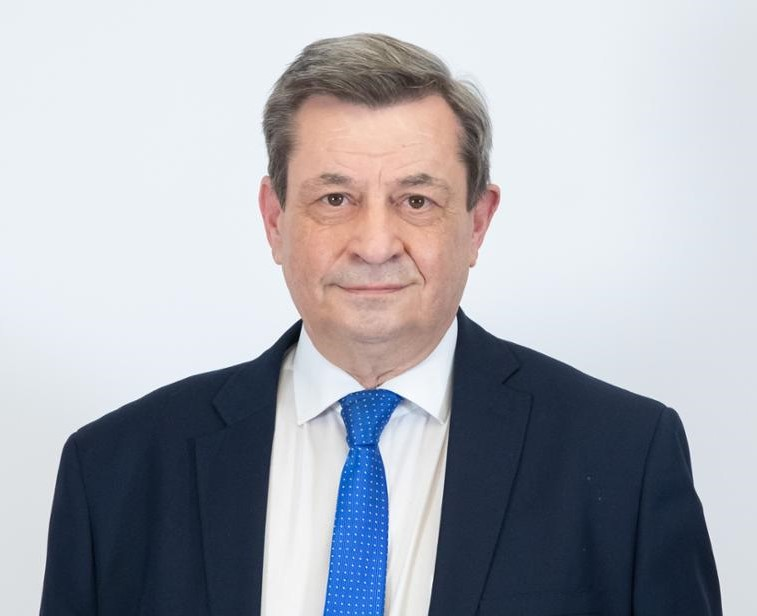

8th Poland Ambassador to the Czech Republic
- In office 30 November 2021 – 31 January 2022
- Preceded by: Barbara Ćwioro
- Succeeded by: Mateusz Gniazdowski

Personal details
- Born: 12 November 1960 (age 66) Bolesławiec, Poland
- Spouse: Dorota Jasińska
- Education: University of Wrocław
- Profession: official, diplomat, screenwriter, film director

Mirosław Stanisław Jasiński (born 12 November 1960 in Bolesławiec) is a Polish film director, screenwriter, official, and diplomat, who between 2021 and 2022 served as the Polish ambassador to the Czech Republic.

== Life ==
In 1986, Jasiński graduated from Polish Studies and History of Art at the University of Wrocław. He was co-founder of the Independent Students' Association at the University. He was hiding after declaring of the martial law in Poland in December 1981. He was core member of the Polish-Czechoslovak Solidarity (later – Polish-Czech-Slovak Solidarity).

After the fall of socialism in Poland, from 1990 to January 1991 he was head of the Political Unit at the Embassy of Poland in Prague. In 1991, firstly, he took post of the deputy voivode of the Wrocław Voivodeship, and, secondly, of the voivode. He ended his term in 1992. Until 1994, he was lecturer at the Wrocław University of Science and Technology.

Between 2001 and 2005, he was Director of the Polish Institute in Prague. Later, he was working for private companies such as PKN Orlen and Unipetrol as advisor and head of international cooperation. In 2012, he became director of the Mińsk Gallery in Wrocław. On 11 October 2021 he was nominated Poland ambassador to the Czech Republic. He took his post on 30 November 2021, and presented his credentials on 20 December 2021. He ended his term on 31 January 2022.

Jasiński has been also active as a screenwriter and film director, mostly documentaries, such as: Kaman (1995), Wygrani przegrani (1996), Polski dom (1998), Wojna z wodą (1998), Magdalena Abakanowicz (2000), Bełz. Rok 1951 (2001), Prawdziwy koniec wojny (2001).

Between 1991 and 2001 he was member of the Centre Agreement, Ruch dla Rzeczypospolitej, Ruch Stu, Solidarity Electoral Action.

He is married to Dorota Jasińska. Besides Polish, Jasiński speaks Czech and English languages.

== Honours ==
- Bronze Cross of Merit, Poland, 2005
- Officer's Cross of the Order of Polonia Restituta, Poland, 2007
- USTR Prize for Freedom, Democracy and Human Rights, Czech Republic, 2014
- Medal of Merit for Diplomacy of the Czech Republic, Czech Republic, 2019
- Cross of Freedom and Solidarity, Poland, 2020
- Bene Merito honorary badge, Poland, 2020
