= Grażyna Bernatowicz =

Polish diplomat

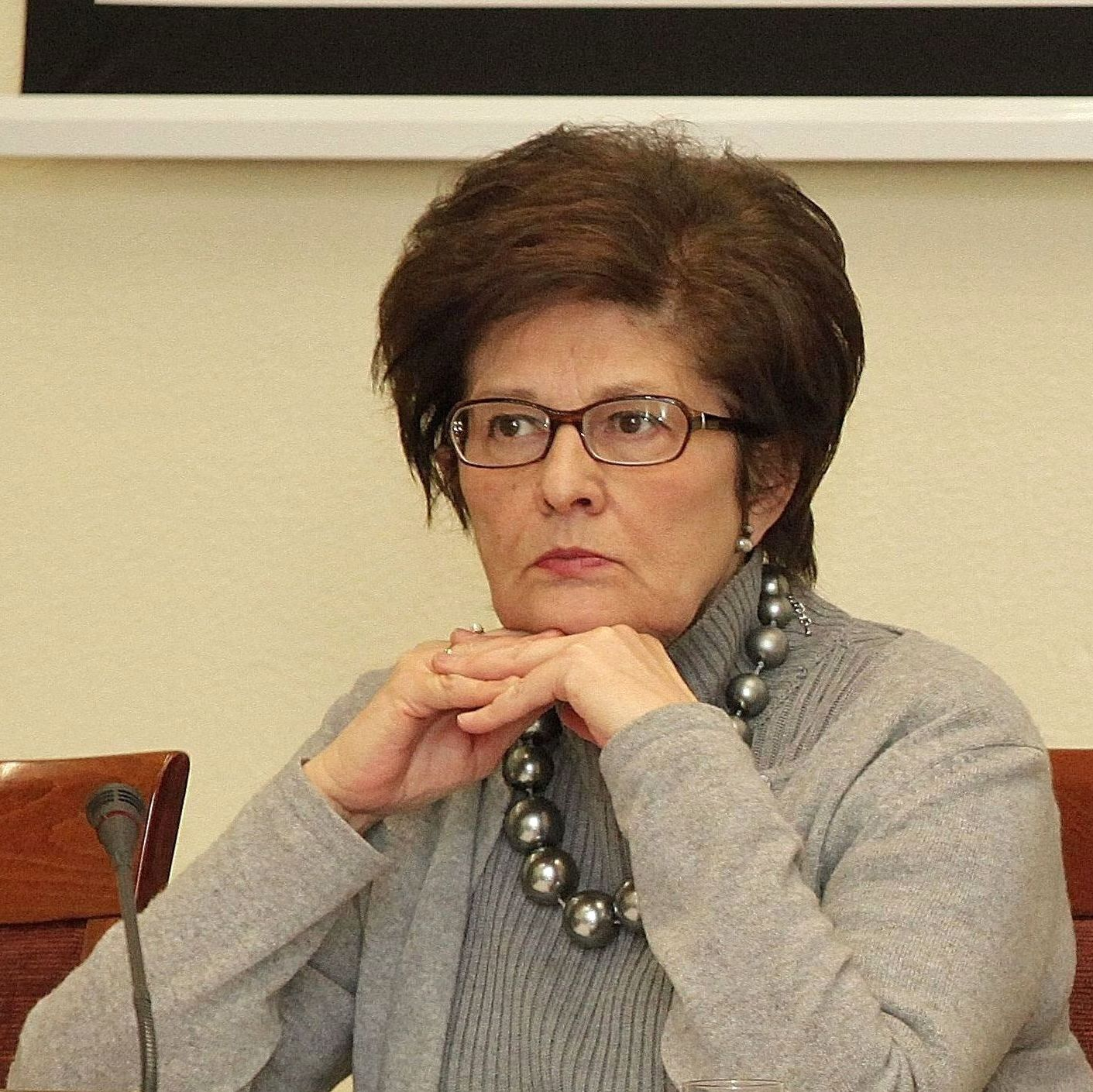
- Grażyna Bernatowicz (2013)

Poland ambassador to the Czech Republic
- In office 2013–2017
- Preceded by: Jan Pastwa (pl)
- Succeeded by: Barbara Ćwioro

Undersecretary of State at the Polish Ministry of Foreign Affairs
- In office 2007–2013

Poland Ambassador to Spain
- In office 2002–2007
- Preceded by: Jerzy Maria Nowak (pl)
- Succeeded by: Ryszard Schnepf

Undersecretary of State at the Polish Ministry of Foreign Affairs
- In office 2000–2002

Personal details
- Born: 12 March 1946 (age 80) Warsaw, Poland
- Occupation: Diplomat

Grażyna Maria Bernatowicz (born 12 March 1946 in Warsaw) is a Polish diplomat and political scientist. She was the Undersecretary of State at the Ministry of Foreign Affairs of Poland from 2000 to 2002, and again from 2007 to 2013. She has been the Polish ambassador to Spain and Andorra (2002–2007), and to the Czech Republic (2013–2017).

== Life and career ==
In 1968, Bernatowicz graduated from the Faculty of Law at the University of Warsaw. In 1975 she obtained a doctoral degree in law there, with a doctoral dissertation entitled Wewnętrznych i zewnętrznych uwarunkowań polityki zagranicznej Hiszpanii (Internal and external determinants of Spanish foreign policy). In 1992, she was awarded a Habilitation in humanities with a specialization in political science.

After obtaining her doctoral dissertation, Bernatowicz became a professor in the Faculty of Law of the Polish Institute of International Affairs. In 1995, she became a professor at the Helena Chodkowska University (pl).

Beginning in 1993, Bernatowicz joined the Polish Ministry of Foreign Affairs. There she first worked as an advisor to the minister and deputy director of the Strategic Research Department, and in 1998 became a coordinator of issues related to European integration. From 2000 to 2002, she was the Undersecretary of State in the Ministry of Foreign Affairs.

In April 2002, Bernatowicz was appointed by the President of Poland to be Ambassador to Spain and Andorra. She served in this role until 2007, when she was re-appointed to the office of the Undersecretary of State at the Ministry of Foreign Affairs.

In 2013, Bernatowicz was appointed Poland's ambassador to the Czech Republic, and retired in 2017.

== Selected Awards and Honours ==
- Portuguese Order of Merit, 2008
- Order of Merit of the Republic of Hungary, 2009
- Maltese Order of Merit, 2010
- Commandeur of the Order of Saint-Charles, Monaco, 2012
- Royal Norwegian Order of Merit, 2012
- Officer of the Order of the Rebirth of Poland, 2013
