= Barbara Ćwioro =

Polish diplomat

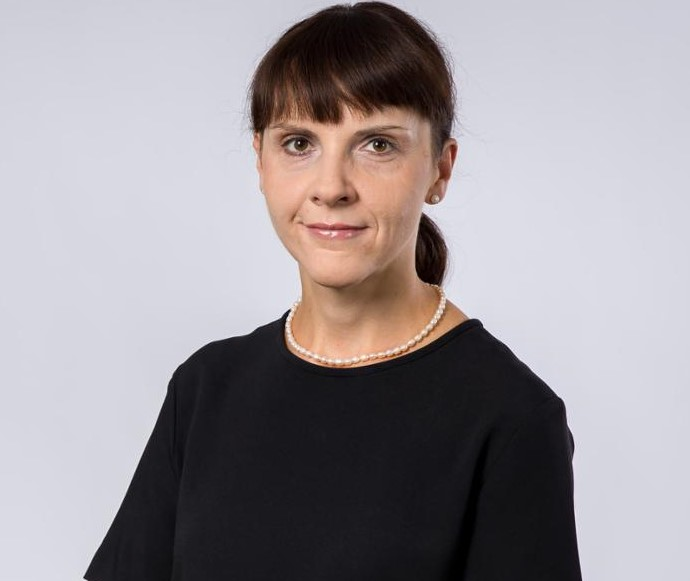

Poland Ambassador to the Czech Republic
- In office 11 September 2018 – 30 June 2020
- Preceded by: Grażyna Bernatowicz
- Succeeded by: Mirosław Jasiński

Personal details
- Education: Jagiellonian University
- Profession: Diplomat

Barbara Anna Ćwioro is a Polish diplomat, an ambassador to the Czech Republic (2018–2020).

== Life ==
Ćwioro graduated from Iranistics at the Jagiellonian University (2001).

In 2004, she began her career in diplomacy, joining the Ministry of Foreign Affairs. Following her service at the embassy in Tehran and consulate general in Lyon, she was responsible for relations with Iran at the Department of Africa and the Middle East. Between 2005 and 2008 she was working as an assistant of Witold Waszczykowski, then Undersecretary of the Ministry. In 2007, she was an intern at the embassy in Washington, D.C. From 2008 to 2012 she was in charge of relations with European Union, especially Political and Security Committee. From August 2014 she was deputy head of the embassy in Brussels. In 2015, she was accepted by the Sejm Foreign Affairs Committee as an ambassador to Iran, but she did not take the post. Between 2016 and 2018 she was deputy director and then director of the European Policy Department. On 28 August 2018 she was nominated Poland ambassador to the Czech Republic, presenting her letter of credence following month. She ended her term on 30 June 2020 after bullying and harassment accusations.

Besides Polish and Persian, Ćwioro speaks English, French, and Italian languages.
