= BBC News Polska =

Former branch of the BBC World Service

The BBC News Polska (since 2025), BBC Polish Section (1939-2005) (Polish: Sekcja polska BBC) is one of the foreign-language services of the BBC World Service and BBC News.

== History ==
=== BBC Polish Section ===
A decision to establish the BBC Polish Section was made on 3 September 1939, after Great Britain declared war on Germany. The first programme was broadcast on 7 September 1939.

Programmes consisted of news, press reviews, commentaries, reports and interviews, and were also used for transmitting coded messages and orders to the Polish Underground using prearranged selection of songs and code phrases.

The BBC Polish Section was required to support the Soviet Union, per the official British government agenda, and was prohibited from reporting on anything that could show the Soviet Union in a negative light – namely, the issues surrounding the Polish-Soviet border, the Polish population transfers in 1944–1946, the political repression of members of the Home Army, or the Katyn massacre.

After V-E Day, a decision was made to continue broadcasting in Polish. Like other broadcasts from behind the Iron Curtain, BBC Polish-language programmes were jammed and, in the 1950s, listeners on occasion would be persecuted as enemies of the people. Jamming stopped in the 1970s but was reintroduced in 1981 as the authorities clamped down on political freedom (see martial law in Poland). Jamming finally ended in 1988. During the post-war period, while still concentrating on impartial and uncensored news, programming was expanded to culture, technology, social matters, British life and daily English language lessons.

In 1996, the office in Warsaw was opened.

On 25 October 2005, it was announced that 10 foreign-language services, including Polish, will be closed to free resources needed to start a new Arabic-language television service. The last broadcast in Polish took place on 23 December 2005.

=== BBC News Polska ===
In May 2025, the BBC announced a new Polish service, BBC News Polska, to be launched on 24 June. Apart from its website, it publishes content on Facebook and Instagram. The BBC said that BBC News Polska was intended to "help counter a wave of disinformation in the region". It uses artificial intelligence to translate existing content, and also publishes original content by Polish-speaking journalists.

In the first four months it a growing weekly audience of over 250,000 users across its digital platforms. In October a partnership was announced with Onet.pl

== Key personnel ==
=== Heads of Polish Section ===
- Robin Campbell (1939–?)
- Michael Winch (?–1942)
- Gregory MacDonald (1942–1945)
- Evelyn Zasio (1945–1953)
- Józef Zarański (1953–1960)
- Stanisław Faecher (1960–1966)
- Zbigniew Błażyński (1966–1973)
- Jan Krok-Paszkowski (1973–1980)
- Krzysztof Pszenicki (1980–1988)
- Eugeniusz Smolar (1988–1998)
- Marek Cajzner (1998–2005)

=== Heads of Warsaw Office ===
- Robert Kozak
- Leszek Jarosz

=== BBC News Polska ===
==== Presenters ====
- Kasia Madera, Chief Presenter
- Tomasz Schafernaker

==== Reporters ====
- Magda Miś
- Adam Easton – Warsaw Correspondent, BBC News English
