= Eugeniusz Smolar =

Polish journalist

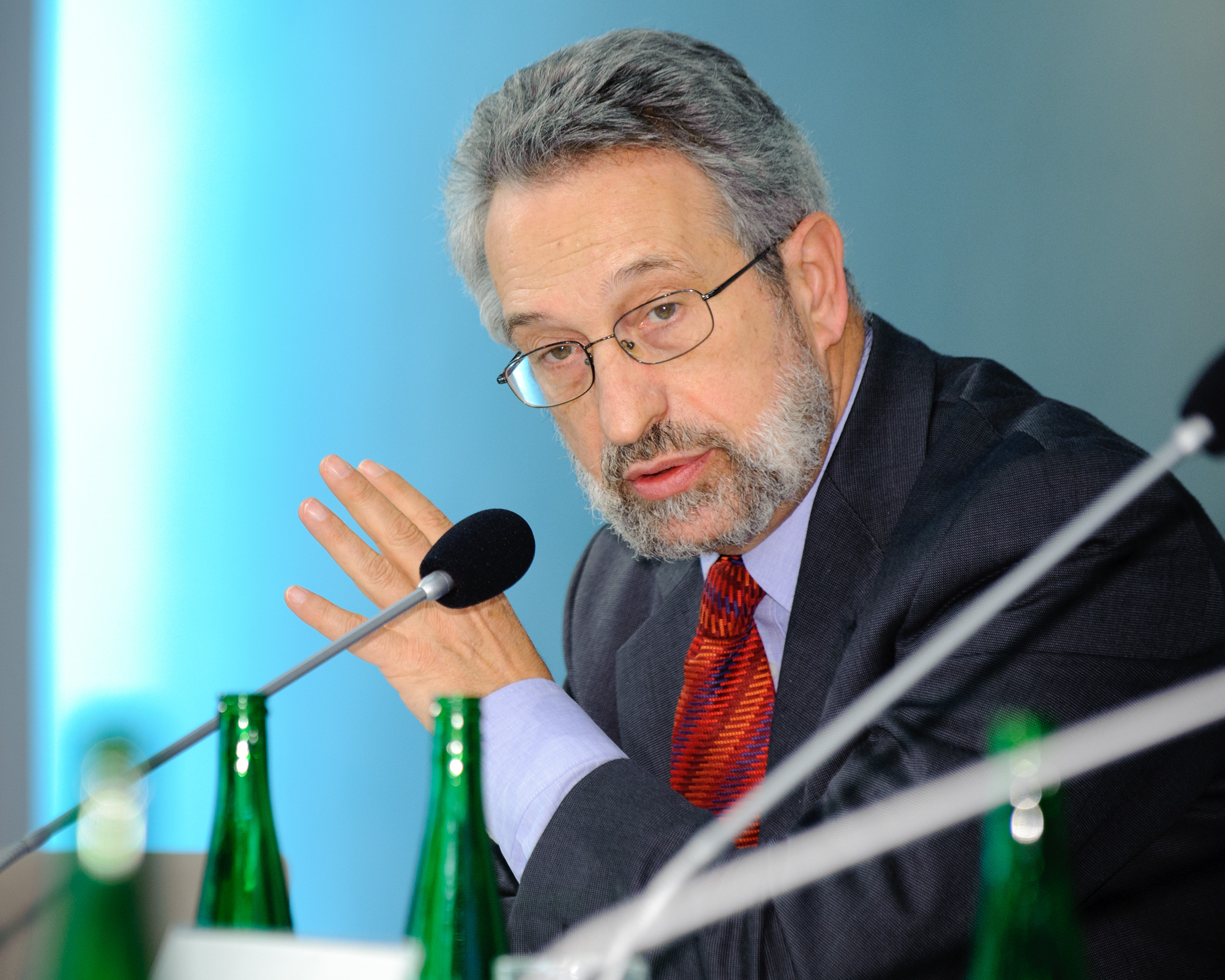
Eugeniusz Smolar, 2010

Eugeniusz Smolar (born December 31, 1945) is a Polish journalist and member of the opposition movement during the People's Republic of Poland. He is the brother of Aleksander Smolar who is the head of the Stefan Batory Foundation in Warsaw, established in 1988 by American financier and philanthropist George Soros. He is son of prominent communist activist Grzegorz Smolar.

== Biography ==
Under socialist Poland Smolar was a member of the opposition movement. He was imprisoned during his university studies in 1968 and 1969 for participating in student demonstrations protesting the Warsaw Pact invasion of Czechoslovakia. In 1970, Smolar emigrated from Poland to Sweden and was involved in creating and publishing a political quarterly, Aneks. He was involved in organizing aid for the Polish opposition and the Solidarity (Polish trade union) movement.

He later became a journalist for the BBC and was the director of the BBC Polish Section between 1988 and 1997. After returning to Poland in 1997 he became a member of the board of Polish Radio. Between 2005 and 2009 he was the President of the Centre of International Relations in Warsaw. He is also a member of the editorial board of New Eastern Europe.
