= Mateusz Gniazdowski =

Polish political scientist

Mateusz Gniazdowski Ph.D.
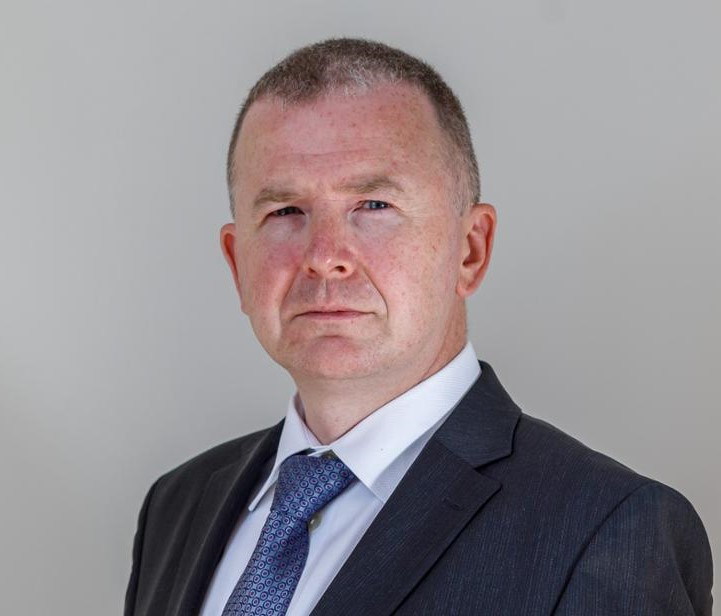

9th Poland Ambassador to the Czech Republic
- In office 16 September 2022 – 31 July 2024
- Preceded by: Mirosław Jasiński

Personal details
- Born: 1974 (age 51–52) Warsaw, Poland
- Children: 2
- Education: University of Warsaw
- Profession: political scientist

Mateusz Gniazdowski (born 1974 in Warsaw) is a Polish political scientist, expert on Central European issues. Ambassador of the Republic of Poland to the Czech Republic, heading the Polish diplomatic mission in Prague during the period: 16 September 2022 – 31 July 2024.

== Life ==
In 2000, Gniazdowski graduated with honours from Political Science at the University of Warsaw. He previously graduated from the Secondary Technical Aviation School in Warsaw (1994) and also studied at the Faculty of Power and Aeronautical Engineering at the Warsaw University of Technology (1994–95). He received his doctoral degree from the Slovak Academy of Sciences. From 2004 to 2010 he worked at the Polish Institute of International Affairs (PISM). He was deputy head of the PISM Research Office and coordinator of the programme for bilateral relations in Europe. In 2010, he joined the Centre for Eastern Studies (OSW). He was head of the Central European Department. Between 15 February 2016 and September 2022 he was Deputy Director there. On 22 August 2022 he was nominated as Polish ambassador to the Czech Republic. He took his post on 16 September 2022, and presented his credentials to President Miloš Zeman on 21 September 2022. He concluded his tenure as head of the Polish Embassy in Prague on July 31 and was recalled to the headquarters in Warsaw. President of Poland Andrzej Duda, as in the case of other ambassadors, did not agree to his dismissal.

In his work as an analyst, he specialized in the internal and foreign policy and regional cooperation of the Central European countries, especially the Visegrad Group; public diplomacy; historical issues in foreign policy. During his work at the Centre for Eastern Studies (OSW), he launched a research project focused on the role of connectivity in Central and Eastern Europe. In his academic work, he primarily focused on the history of Polish-Czech and Polish-Slovak relations in the 20th century. He is a co-author or editor of several book publications and has written numerous scholarly articles.

He was chairman of the Policy Board of the Czech-Polish Forum (2013-2022), appointed by the Minister of Foreign Affairs, Radosław Sikorski. He has been a member of the Polish-Slovak Commission for the Humanities at the Ministry of Science and Higher Education of Poland, and at the Ministry of Education, Science, Research and Sport of Slovakia since 2014, and as of 1 October 2025, he serves as the Commission’s co-chair. He was a member of the Editorial Committee of the Polish Diplomatic Review [Polski Przegląd Dypomatyczny], and co-coordinator of the Polish part of the Think Visegrad – V4 Think Tank Platform.

He is married with two daughters.

== Honours ==
- Bene Merito honorary badge, Poland, 2022
