= Czesław Łuczak =

Polish historian

Czesław Łuczak (born 19 February 1922 in Kruszwica – 10 August 2002 in Poznań) was a Polish historian focusing on World War II. He served as rector of the Adam Mickiewicz University in Poznań from 1965 to 1972; and, from 1969 to 1981 and from 1987 to 1991, as director of the university's Institute of History. He was a member of the Polish United Workers' Party in communist Poland.

As scholar, he specialized in the modern economic history of Poland, Germany and Polish-German relations. He published over 50 books and hundreds of articles.

== Selected publications ==
- "Kraj Warty" 1939-1945. Studium historyczno-gospodarcze okupacji hitlerowskiej (1972)
- Polscy robotnicy przymusowi w Trzeciej Rzeszy podczas II wojny światowej (1974)
- Polityka ludnościowa i ekonomiczna hitlerowskich Niemiec w okupowanej Polsce, Wyd. Poznańskie, Poznań 1979 ISBN 83-210-0010-X
- Polityka ekonomiczna III Rzeszy w latach drugiej wojny światowej (1982)
- Dzieje gospodarcze Niemiec 1871–1945 (1984)
- Dzieje gospodarcze Wielkopolski w okresie zaborów 1815-1918 (1988)
- Od Bismarcka do Hitlera : polsko-niemieckie stosunki gospodarcze (1988)
- Zagłada (1989)
- Dzień po dniu w okupowanym Poznaniu (1989)
- Dzień po dniu w okupowanej Wielkopolsce i na Ziemi Łódzkiej (Kraj Warty) (1989)
- Praca przymusowa Polaków w III Rzeszy (1989)
- Polska i Polacy w drugiej wojnie światowej (1993)
- Dzieje Mogilna (1998)
- Historia gospodarcza Niemiec lat 1871-1990 (2002)
