= Saint symbolism: Saints (A–H) =

Attribute identifying a saint in artworks

Saint symbolism has been used from the very beginnings of the religion. Each saint is said to have led an exemplary life and symbols have been used to tell these stories throughout the history of the Church. A number of Christian saints are traditionally represented by a symbol or iconic motif associated with their life, termed an attribute or emblem, in order to identify them. The study of these forms part of iconography in art history. They were particularly used so that the illiterate could recognize a scene, and to give each of the Saints something of a personality in art. They are often carried in the hand by the Saint.

Attributes often vary with either time or geography, especially between Eastern Christianity and the West. Orthodox images more often contained inscriptions with the names of saints, so the Eastern repertoire of attributes is generally smaller than the Western.^{[c]} Many of the most prominent saints, like Saint Peter and Saint John the Evangelist can also be recognised by a distinctive facial type. Some attributes are general, such as the martyr's palm. The use of a symbol in a work of art depicting a Saint reminds people who is being shown and of their story. The following is a list of some of these attributes.

== Saints listed by name ==
Saints (I–P)

Saints (Q–Z)

=== A ===
A
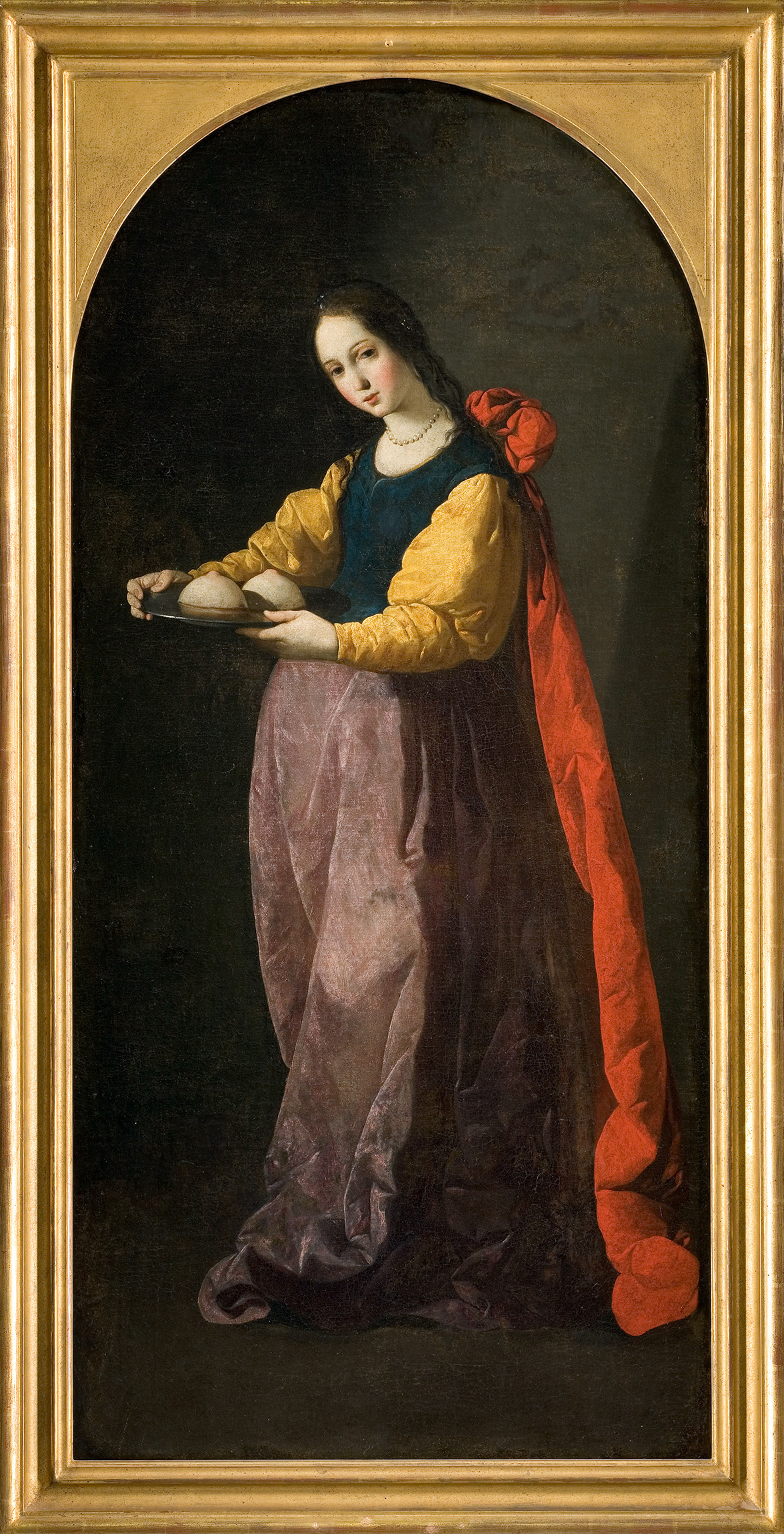
St. Agatha with her breasts on a plate

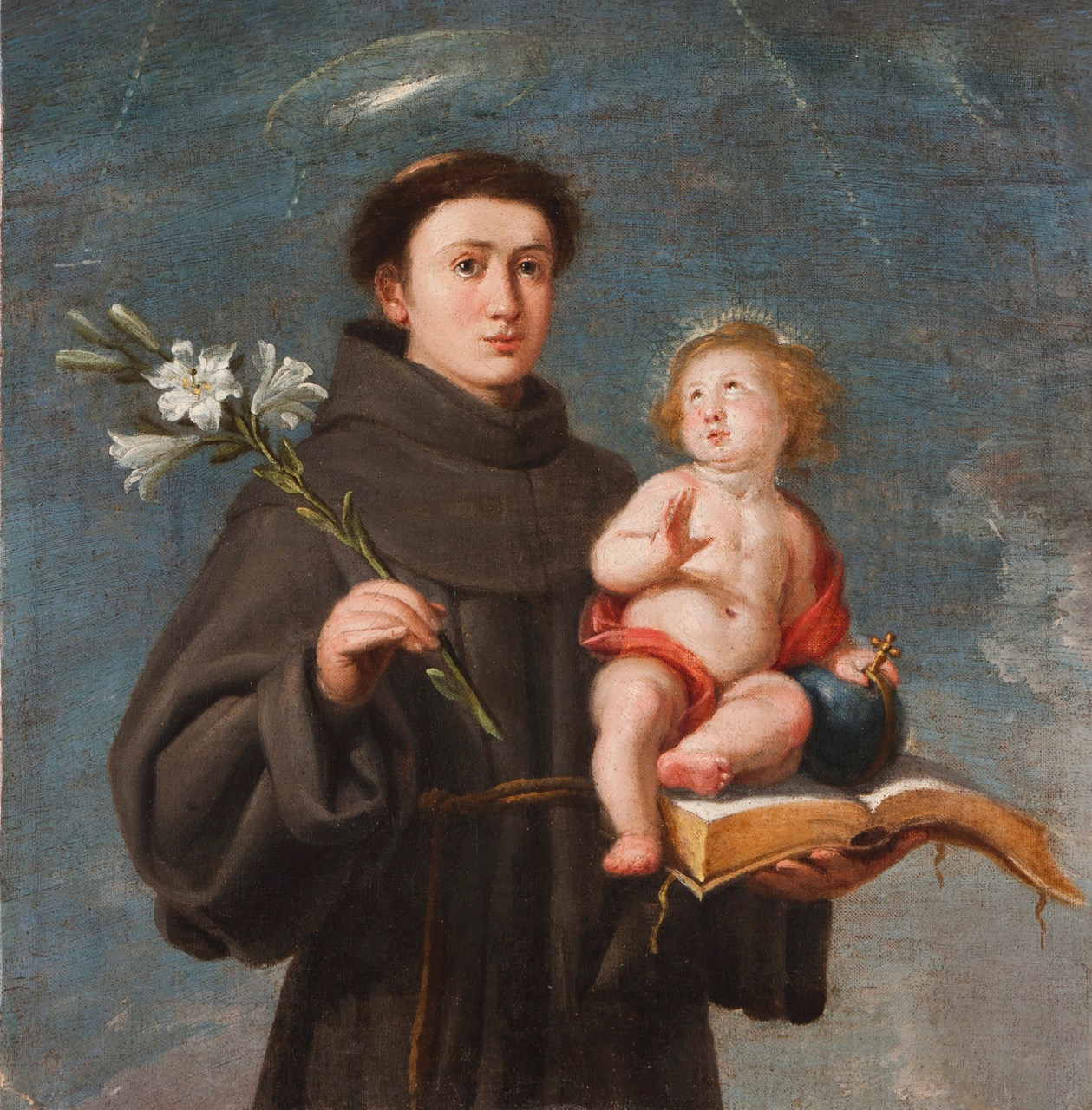
Anthony of Padua with the Christ Child, a book, and a white lily

Saint	Symbol
Abanoub	kneeling in prayer while angels bring wreaths of flowers
Abdon and Sennen	in fur tunics
Abercius of Hieropolis	crosier brought to him by an angel
Abraham of Arbela	sword near him^{[d]}
Abraham the Poor	an old hermit clothed in skins and sporting a blowing beard; in his cell with his niece Mary in an adjoining cell
Abundius	bishop with a stag, raising a dead child to life
Acathius of Melitene	crown of thorns^{[a]}
Acisclus	with Saint Victoria, his sister, crowned with roses
Accursius	Franciscan with a sword in his breast^{[d]}
Adalard of Corbie	Bishop giving alms^{[d]}
Adalbero of Würzburg	Holding a church in his hand
Adalbert	spears, bishop clothes, book, paddle, Rarely even scales or Paladium of Bohemia
Adèle de Batz de Trenquelléon	Religious habit of the Marianist Sisters
Adjutor	throwing his chains into whirlpool^{[d]}
Adolph Kolping	cassock with black zucchetto
Adrian of Batanea	lion by his side^{[d]}
Adrian and Natalia of Nicomedia	in armor, holding a hammer and anvil
Ælfheah of Canterbury	axe^{[a]}
Aelred of Rievaulx	crozier of an abbot, holding a book
Aemilian of Cogolla	habit of a monk, on horseback
Æthelred and Æthelberht	in royal attire, sometimes with swords
Æthelthryth	holding a model of Ely Cathedral
Afra	being burned at the stake
Agatha of Sicily	tongs or shears, veil, bells, two breasts on a plate^{[a]}
Agathius	martyr's palm, soldier's attire with a bunch of thorns, in armor with standard and shield, with Theodore of Amasea
Agnello of Naples	Habit of a Basilian monk
Agnes of Montepulciano	Lily and a lamb
Agnes of Rome	lamb^{[a]}, martyr's palm, sword
Agostina Livia Pietrantoni	Religious habit of a Sister of Divine Charity
Agricola of Avignon	stork
Agrippina of Mineo	martyr's palm
Aichardus	Angel touching monks with a staff
Aidan of Lindisfarne	giving his horse to a poor man^{[d]}
Aignan of Orleans	praying on the top of the walls of Orléans
Aimée-Adèle Le Bouteiller	Religious habit of the Sisters of Marie Madeleine Postel
Aimone Taparelli	Dominican habit
Alban	tall cross and a sword^{[d]}
Alban of Mainz	holding his own head in his hands^{[d]}
Albert Chmielowski	priest's attire
Albert of Louvain	Cardinal seated with three swords on the ground before him^{[d]}
Albert of Trapani	Carmelite habit, lily, book, devil, with Angelus of Jerusalem,
Alberto da Bergamo	Dominican habit, dove
Alberto Hurtado	Jesuit habit, an old green van
Albertus Magnus	Dominican habit, books and scrolls, writing with a quill
Alcide-Vital Lataste	Dominican habit
Aldebrandus	episcopal robes, holding a cathedral
Alexander of Bergamo	soldier, military standard, bearing white lily
Alexandra of Rome	crown
Alexius of Rome	man lying beneath a staircase
Alexius, Metropolitan of Kiev	Vested wearing bishop's omophorion and patriarch's koukoulion. Sometimes holding a Gospel Book with his right hand raised in blessing
Alfie Lambe	rosary, vexillium legionis
Alfonsa Clerici	Religious habit of a Sister of the Most Precious Blood
Alfonso Maria Fusco	cassock
Alfred the Great	codex, crown, orb/scepter^{[a]}
Alojs Andritzki	cassock
Alonso de Orozco Mena	Augustinian habit, crucifix
Aloysius Gonzaga	crucifix, lily
Aloysius Schwartz	cassock, rosary
Alphonsa of the Immaculate Conception	rosary, bible in hands
Álvaro of Córdoba (Dominican)	Dominican habit
Alypius the Stylite	clothed in his monastic habit, standing atop a pillar
Amabilis of Riom	bishop listening to an angel playing music
Amalberga of Maubeuge	holding an open book and with a crown on her head
Amalberga of Temse	sturgeon
Amandus	holding a church building
Amaro	pilgrim's staff
Amato Ronconi	Franciscan habit, staff
Amator	bishop with axe and tree
Ambrose of Optina	clothed as a monk, sometimes holding a scroll
Ambrose	bees, beehive, dove, ox, pen^{[a]}
Amphibalus	cloak
Maria Berenice Hencker	Religious habit of the Little Sisters of the Annunciation, crucifix
Ana Monteagudo Ponce de Leon	Dominican habit
Ana Petra Pérez Florido	Religious habit
Anastasia of Sirmium	palm branch, martyr's cross, medicine pot
Anatolius of Constantinople	Vested as a bishop with omophorion, holding a Gospel Book
Andeolus	holding a book and palm of martyrdom, head pierced by a wooden knife
André Abellon	Dominican habit
Andrea Bertoni	Servite habit
Andrea Caccioli	Franciscan habit
Andrea dei Conti	Franciscan habit, purple stole
André-Hubert Fournet	priest's attire
Andrei Rublev	clothed as an Orthodox monk, often shown holding an icon
Andrés Hibernón Real	Franciscan habit
Andrés Manjón	priest's cassock
Andrew of Crete	as a bishop, holding a gospel book or scroll, with his right hand raised in blessing, with a full head of grey hair and a long, tapering grey beard
Andrew of Montereale	Augustinian habit, bible, stole
Andrew Stratelates	soldier holding a pilum
Andrew the Apostle	a saltire
Andrew the Scot	curing a paralytic girl; sometimes shown appearing to a sleeping priest; Irish Wolfhound
Andrew Zorard	walnuts, eagle, chain, axe, rocks
Andrey Bogolyubsky	clothed as a Russian Grand Prince, holding a three-bar cross in his right hand
Andronicus of Pannonia	laurel wreath as a symbol of martyrdom
Andronicus, Probus, and Tarachus	Andronicus elderly, in the robes of a Roman citizen, with a spear, the companions with martyrs' crosses or spears
Angadrisma	her face scarred by leprosy
Angel of Portugal	Archangel carrying the Portuguese Shield
Ángela Ginard Martí	Religious habit, martyr's palm
Angela Merici	cloak, ladder
Angela of Foligno	Religious habit
Angelo Agostini Mazzinghi	flowers, wreath, rosary, crucifix, Carmelite habit
Angelo Carletti di Chivasso	Franciscan habit
Angelo da Foligno	Augustinian habit
Angelo da Furci	Augustinian habit, crucifix
Angelo Paoli	Carmelite habit
Angelus of Jerusalem	Carmelite habit, sword through chest, book, palm, three crowns, lilies, roses
Anna Kolesárová	Martyr's palm, Lily flower, Rosary
Anna Maria Adorni Botti	Religious habit, crucifix
Anna Maria Janer Anglarill	Religious habit
Anna Maria Rubatto	Religious habit
Anna Maria Taigi	sun, bright globe, Triniatrian scapular
Anne, grandmother of Jesus	door, book^{[a]}, with the Virgin Mary reading, red robe and green mantle
Anne Catherine Emmerich	bedridden with bandaged head and holding a crucifix
Anne de Guigné	lily flower, rosary
Anne of Saint Bartholomew	Religious habit
Anne-Marie Rivier	Religious habit
Annibale Maria di Francia	Religious habit of the Rogationist Fathers
Annunciata Astoria Cocchetti	Religious habit of the Sisters of Saint Dorothy of Cemmo
Ansanus	holding a cluster of dates, a heart with IHS or liver, martyr's palm, being boiled in oil or beheaded; banner bearing the arms of Siena; baptismal cup; fountain
Ansovinus	bishop with a barn near him; fruit and garden produce
Anthelm of Belley	holding a lamp lit by a divine hand
Anthony Baldinucci	with a miraculous Refugium Peccatorum image of the Virgin Mary
Anthony Mary Claret	bishop's robe, crozier, an open book, catechism, 2 students beside him at his side and having his bent arm pointing to the sky
Anthony of Kiev	Religious habit, abbot's paterissa
Anthony of Padua	Christ Child, bread, book, white lily^{[a]}
Anthony the Great	bell, pig, T-shaped cross^{[a]}; Tau cross with bell pendant
Anthony Zaccaria	cassock, lily, cross, chalice, Eucharist
Antiochus of Sulcis	martyr's palm
Antipas of Pergamum	martyr's palm
Antoine Chevrier	cassock, crucifix
Anton Maria Schwartz	cassock
Antonia Luzmila Rivas López	religious habit of the Sisters of the Good Shepherd, martyr's palm
Antonia Maria Verna	religious habit of the Sisters of Charity of the Immaculate Conception,
Antonia Mesina	martyr's palm, lily, rosary
Maria Ludovica De Angelis	religious habit of the Daughters of Our Lady of Mercy
Antoninus of Sorrento	Benedictine habit, holding a standard and the city wall
Antonio da Stroncone	Habit of the Order of Friars Minor
Antonio della Chiesa	Dominican habit
Antonio Franco (blessed)	bishop's attire and insignia
Antonio Grassi	cassock, rosary
Antonio Maria Pucci	cassock
Antonio Patrizi	Augustinian habit
Antonio Pavoni	Dominican habit, martyr's palm
Antonio Pietro Cortinovis	Franciscan habit
Antonio Provolo	cassock
Anysia of Salonika	veil, martyr's cross
Aphrodisius	holding his own head
Apollinaris of Ravenna	sword
Apollonia	tongs (sometimes with a tooth in them), holding a martyr's cross or martyr's palm or crown
Aquilinus of Milan	sword through his neck
Arcadius of Mauretania	club in his hand, lighted taper or on a rack, limbs chopped off
Arcangelo Tadini	book of hours, cassock
Archangela Girlani	Religious habit
Arialdo	deacon's vestments, holding the palm of martyrdom
Arnold of Arnoldsweiler	harp
Arnold of Soissons	bishop's attire, with a mash rake
Arnulf of Metz	rake in his hand
Asaph	as a bishop with the gospel, or a monk carrying hot coals
Arsenio da Trigolo	Franciscan habit
Artémides Zatti	Pharmacist's lab coat
Assunta Marchetti	Religious habit
Athanasios Parios	long white beard, vested as a priest, holding the gospel book.
Athanasius of Alexandria	bishop arguing with a pagan, bishop holding an open book, bishop standing over a defeated heretic^{[a]}
Auditus of Braga	episcopal vestments or as a hermit
Augusta of Treviso	sword, funeral pyre, wheel in the act of her father killing her
Augustine of Hippo	dove, child, shell, pen, book^{[a]}, heart with a flame
Aurea of Ostia	thrown into the sea with a millstone around her neck
Austrebertha	Religious habit, wolf
Austregisilus	knight on horseback, sometimes with religious habit over his armor; with a man falling from a horse in front of him
Avvakum	cassock, holding the two-fingered sign of the cross
Awtel	monk's or hermit's habit

=== B ===
B
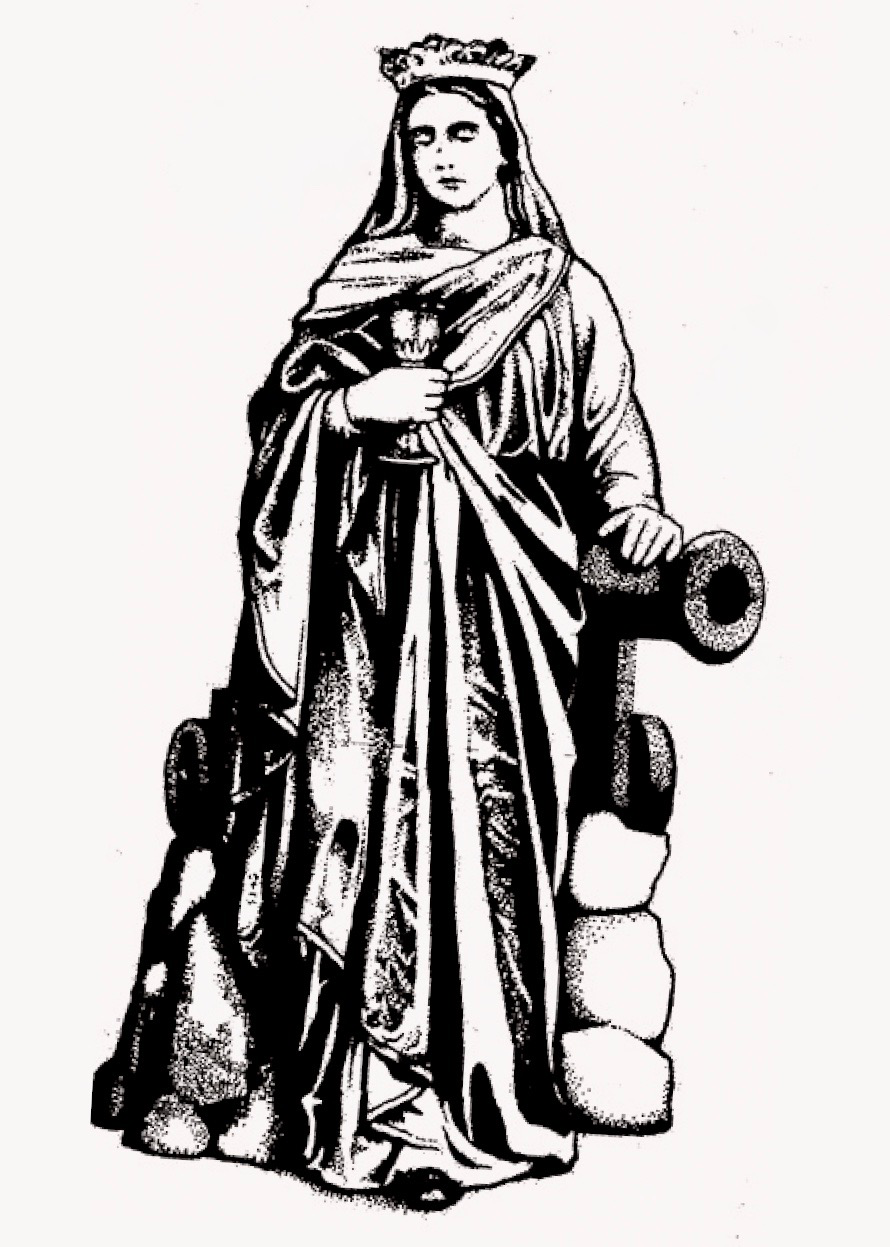
Saint Barbara with chalice and cannon

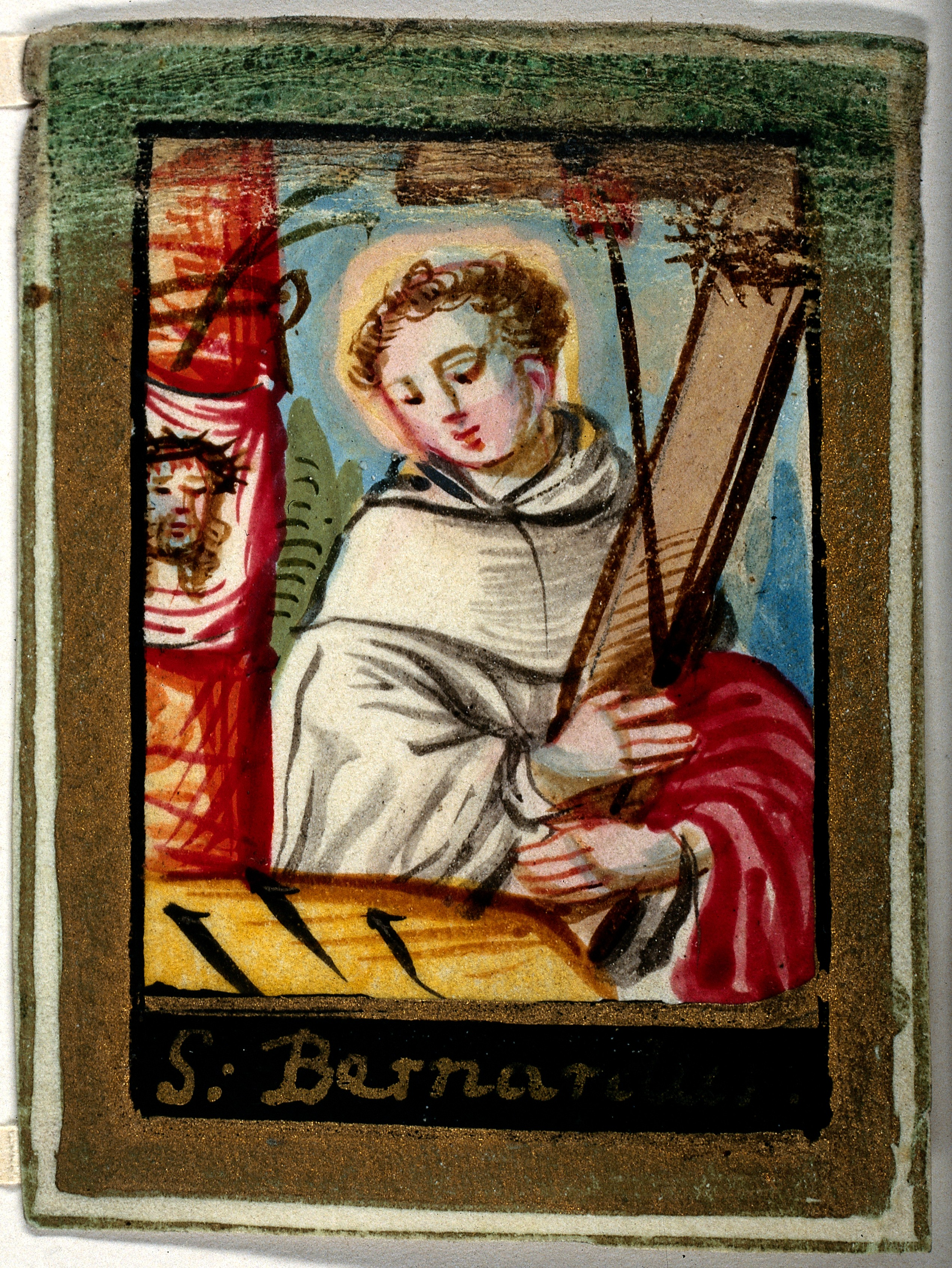
Saint Bernard of Clairvaux with the instruments of the Passion

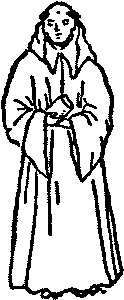
Benedictine religious habit

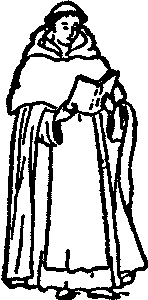
Dominican religious habit

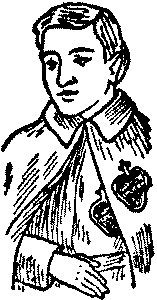
Passionist habit

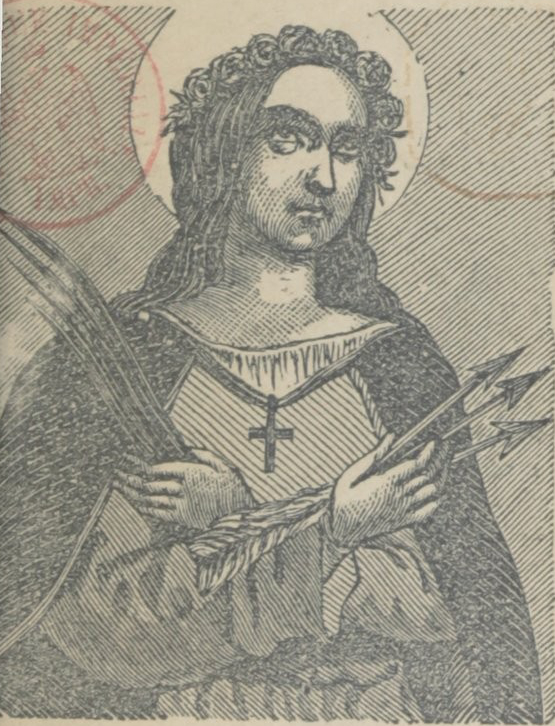
Blandina with a martyr's crown

Saint	Symbol
Babylas of Antioch	bishop with three small boys
Balthazar	bearded black magus offering a covered cup to the Infant Jesus
Barachiel	a white rose
Barbara	tower (often with three windows), chalice, ciborium, cannon^{[a]}
Barbatus of Benevento	ordering a tree cut down
Barnabas	pilgrim's staff, olive branch^{[a]}
Basil of Ancyra	with a lioness at his side
Basil of Caesarea (Basil the Great)	dove perched on his arm
Baudolino	bishop preaching to geese, deer, and other animals
Bavo of Ghent	sword, sceptre, hooded hawk
Béchara Abou Mrad	prayer rope
Bede	a monk holding a pen
Bega	bracelet
Belina (virgin)	sword
Benedetta Cambiagio Frassinello	Religious habit
Benedict	broken cup, raven, bell, crosier, bush, a bound bundle of sticks
Benedict XI	Papal vestments, Papal tiara, Dominican habit
Benedict XIII	Papal vestments, Papal tiara, Dominican habit
Benedict Biscop	bishop holding crosier in one hand and open book in the other
Benedict Joseph Labre	beggar sharing alms with other poor
Benedict Menni	Priest's cassock, Crucifix
Benvenuta Bojani	Dominican habit, rope
Bénézet	portrayed as a boy carrying a large stone on his shoulder
Beniamino Filon	Franciscan habit
Benigna Cardoso da Silva	Martyr's palm, lily flower, rosary, book, pot jar, (occasionally) a knife
Benignus of Dijon	dog, key
Benildus Romançon	Man of Sacrifice to God
Benincasa da Montepulciano	Servite habit
Benno of Meissen	fish with keys in its mouth, book^{[a]}
Berlinda of Meerbeke	nun's habit, with a cow and either a pruning hook or branch, sometimes portrayed with Saints Nona and Celsa
Bernard Łubieński	Priest's cassock
Bernard Mary of Jesus	Passionist habit
Bernard of Clairvaux	pen, bees, instruments of the Passion^{[a]}
Bernard of Corleone	Franciscan habit
Bernard of Menthon	with the devil in chains at or under his feet
Bernard of Offida	Franciscan habit, skull
Bernarda Heimgartner	Religious habit
Bernardine of Feltre	Holding three green hills symbolic of monti di pietà
Bernardino of Siena	tablet or sun inscribed with IHS, three mitres^{[a]}
Bernardino Realino	Priest's cassock
Bernardo Francisco de Hoyos de Seña	Priest's cassock
Bernardo Scammacca	Dominican habit
Bernardo Tolomei	Benedictine habit
Bernardyna Maria Jabłońska	Religious habit
Bernward of Hildesheim	Bishop vestments, small cross, hammer, chalice
Bertha of Artois	a nun kneeling before an altar with her daughter
Bertharius of Monte Cassino	palm of martyrdom
Berthold of Garsten	in a monk's habit with a fish.
Bessus	an ostrich feather
Beuno	Monastic habit, insignia of an abbot
Bibiana	bound to a pillar; dagger and palm
Billfrith	Goldsmith
Blaise	two crossed and lit candles, iron comb^{[a]}
Blandina	bull, tied to a pillar with a lion and bear near her
Blessed Martyrs of Drina	Dove, Martyr's palm, Religious habit
Bogumilus	Bishop holding a fish
Boisil	Abbot
Bolesława Lament	Religious habit
Bonaventura Tornielli	Servite habit, Banner, cross
Bonaventure	communion, ciborium, cardinal's hat^{[a]}
Boniface	oak, axe, book, fox, scourge, fountain, raven, sword^{[a]}
Boniface of Tarsus	in a cauldron of boiling oil
Bonifacia Rodríguez y Castro	Co-foundress of the Servants of St. Joseph
Bononio	monastic habit, insignia of an abbot
Boris and Gleb	garments of a prince, holding swords or spears, or martyrs' crosses
Brendan the Navigator	whale; priest celebrating Mass on board a ship while fish gather to listen; one of a group of monks in a small boat ^{[a]}
Bridget of Sweden	book, pilgrim's staff, habit of the Bridgettines ^{[a]}
Brigid of Kildare	cow, crosier, Brigid's cross^{[a]}
Brigida Morello Zancano	Religious habit, crucifix
Bronisław Markiewicz	Priest's cassock
Bruna Pellesi	Religious habit
Bruno Marchesini	Priest's cassock
Bruno of Cologne	seated with mitre and crosier at his feet, an olive branch in his hand
Brynach	Monk or abbot with cuckoo and/or the Nevern Cross
Bystrík	sword, boat, episcopal attributes

=== C ===
C
The college shield of St Catharine's College, Cambridge, prominently depicting a Catherine wheel.

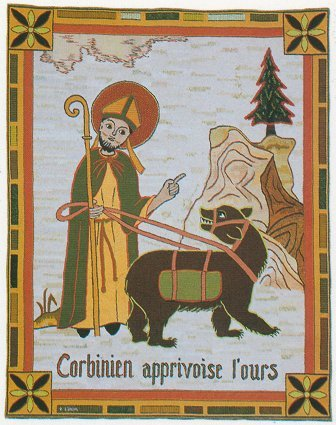
Corbinian Icon of Saint Corbinian and the bear

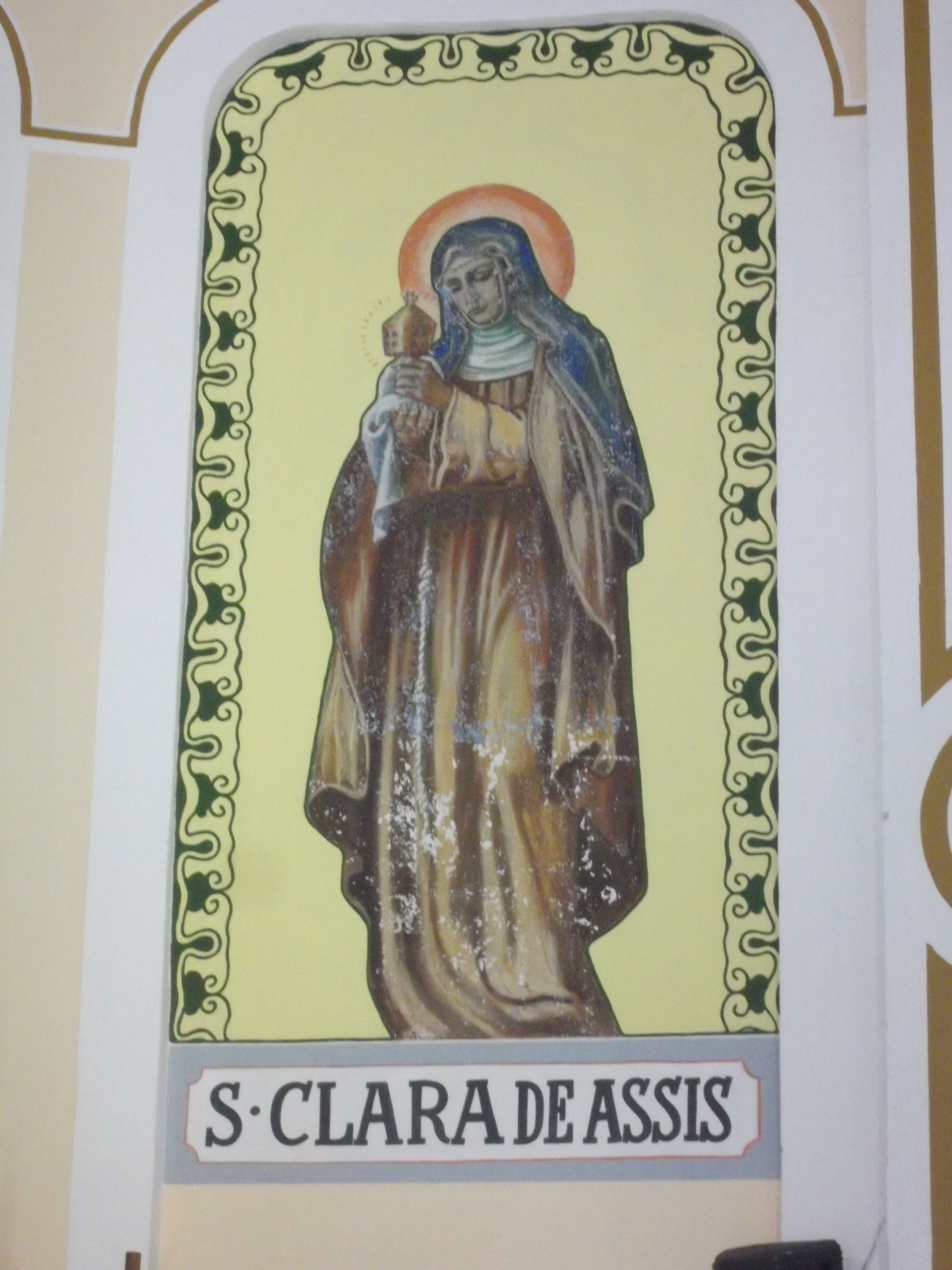
Saint Clare of Assisi holding a ciborium

Saint	Symbol
Cadoc	Bishop throwing a spear, crown at feet, sometimes accompanied by a stag, a pig or a mouse
Cajetan	Priest's cassock^{[b]}
Camillus de Lellis	ministering to the sick
Candidus	Military attire
Cantius, Cantianus, and Cantianilla	Cantius and Cantianus are depicted as two youths; Cantianilla as a girl; Protus as a tutor with a staff and faggot; sword; the group fleeing in a chariot; beheaded before an idol; palms and sword; Protus is sometimes depicted as a bishop
Canute Lavard	knight with a wreath, lance, and ciborium
Caradoc	in chain mail, church in one hand, spear in the other
Caraunus	Priest carrying his head
Carmen Salles y Barangueras	Religious habit
Carolina Santocanale	Religious habit
Carpophorus, Exanthus, Cassius, Severinus, Secundus, and Licinius	Military attire
Casilda of Toledo	Roses in her basket or dress
Castulus	spade
Casimir of Poland and Lithuania	royal attire of crown and red robe lined with ermine, white lily, cross, rosary; sometimes two right hands^{[a]}
Caterina Dominici	Nun's habit, Book, Crucifix
Caterina Moriggi	crucifix, rosary, Religious habit
Caterina Sordini	Religious habit, Heart, With the Blessed Sacrament
Caterina Volpicelli	Rosary
Catherine Aurelia Caouette	Religious habit
Catherine Labouré	Daughters of Charity habit, Miraculous Medal
Catherine of Alexandria	breaking wheel; sword; with a crown at her feet; hailstones; bridal veil and ring; dove; surrounded by angels, scourge; book; woman arguing with pagan philosophers^{[a]}
Catherine of Bologna	carrying the Infant Jesus
Catherine of Genoa	Widow
Catherine of Palma	habit and rochet as used by Augustinian Canonesses
Catherine of Racconigi	Religious habit
Catherine of Ricci	ring, crown, crucifix^{[a]}
Catherine of Siena	stigmata, cross, ring, lily, habit of the Dominican order^{[a]}
Catherine of Vadstena	A hind at her side
Cecilia	organ or other musical instrument, martyr's palm, roses, sword^{[a]}
Cecília Schelingová	Religious habit
Celine Borzecka	Religious habit
Cerbonius	geese, bear licking his feet^{[a]}
Charalambos	Vested as either a priest or bishop, holding a Gospel Book, with right hand raised in blessing.
Charbel Makhlouf	Religious habit, prayer rope
Charles Borromeo	cardinal's robes, the Eucharist^{[a]}
Charles de Foucauld	White religious habit with a heart, crowned with a cross
Charles I of Austria	Imperial attire, Medals
Charles of Mount Argus	Passionist habit, Crucifix, Breviary, Biretta
Charles of Sezze	Franciscan habit
Charles Steeb	Medal, Book, Priest's cassock
Christopher	giant crudely dressed, torrent, tree, branch or large staff, carrying the Christ Child on shoulder^{[a]}
Chiaffredo	military attire; sword; standard of red Mauritian cross on white field; elm tree; horse
Chiara Corbella Petrillo	Wedding gown, Tau cross, Rosary
Chiara Gambacorti	Dominican habit, Crucifix
Child Martyrs of Tlaxcala	Palm, Cross
Christina of Bolsena	pierced by three arrows
Christina of Persia	Martyr's palm, martyr's cross
Christina von Stommeln	Religious habit
Christopher	tree, branch, as a giant or ogre, carrying the Christ child, spear, shield, as a dog-headed man
Chrysanthus and Daria	martyrs' crosses
Chrysogonus	Bearded young man dressed as a Roman military officer
Chrysostomos of Smyrna	Episcopal vestments, usually holding a staff or a Gospel.
Clara Fey	Religious habit
Clare of Assisi	monstrance or ciborium, habit of the Poor Clares^{[a]}, crozier of an abbess
Clare of Montefalco	cross^{[a]}
Claudine Thévenet	Religious habit
Claudio Granzotto	Franciscan habit
Clelia Merloni	Religious habit
Clement of Ohrid	Glagolitic alphabet, Cyrillic script
Clemente da Osimo	Augustinian habit
Clemente Marchisio	Sun, Stole, Cassock
Clement	anchor, fish,^{[a]} Mariner's Cross^{[b]}
Clodoald	A Benedictine abbot giving his hood to a poor man as a halo emanates from his head; with royal insignia at his feet, or instructing the poor
Clotilde Micheli	Religious habit
Clotilde of France	Crown, Rosary, Imperial attire
Clotilde	as a praying queen and as a nun, with a crown on her head or beside her.
Clovis I	suit-of-armour; upright sword; fleur-de-lis; three frogs (his attributed arms)
Coloman of Stockerau	pilgrim monk with a rope in his hand, being hanged on a gibbet, tongs and rod, with a book and maniple.
Colomba Gabriel	Religious habit
Columba of Cornwall	Female carrying a palm branch and a sword, a dove hovering above
Columba of Rieti	Dominican tertiary receiving the Eucharist from a hand reaching down from heaven; Dominican tertiary with a dove, lily, and book, or a wreath of roses, cross, lily, and a rosary
Columba of Sens	she-bear, crowned maiden in chains, with a dog or bear on a chain, holding a book and a peacock's feather, with an angel on a funeral pyre, or beheaded
Columba	Monk's robes, Celtic tonsure and crosier
Conrad of Constance	represented as a bishop holding a chalice with a spider in it or over it.
Constantin Brâncoveanu	with other Wallachian saints, all of them wearing golden cloaks
Constantine IV	Imperial attire
Constantine of Murom	Clothed as Grand Prince, holding a three-bar cross in his right hand
Constantius (Theban Legion)	soldier's attire, bearing a banner with the Mauritian Cross and the palm of martyrdom; spade
Constantius of Perugia	episcopal attire
Contardo of Este	clothed as a pilgrim heading to Santiago of Compostella, sometimes with a scepter and crown at his feet.
Corbinian	Bear; bishop making a bear carry his luggage because it has eaten his mule; bishop with a bear and mule in the background; bishop with Duke Grimoald at his feet, bear with a packsaddle
Corentin of Quimper	fish; episcopal attire
Cornelius the Centurion	Roman military garb
Cosma Spessotto	Franciscan habit
Cosmas of Maiuma	Vested as a bishop, or as a monk, holding a scroll with the words of one of his hymns
Cosmas and Damian	beheaded,, or with medical emblems (phials, box of ointment^{[a]})
Costanza Starace	Nun's habit, Heart
Crescentinus	Military attire, slaying a dragon
Saints Crispin and Crispinian	holding shoes, millstones^{[a]}
Crispin of Viterbo	Franciscan habit
Cristóbal Magallanes Jara	Cassock, sacerdotal vestments, Bible, rosary, and palm of martyrdom
Cucuphas	being beheaded or having his throat cut
Cunigunde of Luxembourg	An empress in imperial robes, sometimes holding a church.
Cuthbert	Bishop holding a second crowned head in his hands; sometimes accompanied by seabirds and animals
Cuthmann of Steyning	wheelbarrow
Cyriacus	deacon's vestments, book of exorcism, with Artemia
Cyricus and Julitta	as a naked child riding on a wild boar
Cyril and Methodius	bishops' vestments, holding a church model, holding an icon of the Last Judgment. Often, Cyril is depicted wearing a monastic habit and Methodius vested as a bishop with omophorion.
Cyril Lucaris	Eastern episcopal vestments, holding a Gospel Book or a crosier, big white beard
Cyril of Constantinople	Carmelite habit
Cyrus and John	monastic habit, John is wearing court robes, holding martyrs' crosses or medicine boxes and medicine spoons which terminate in crosses

=== D ===
D
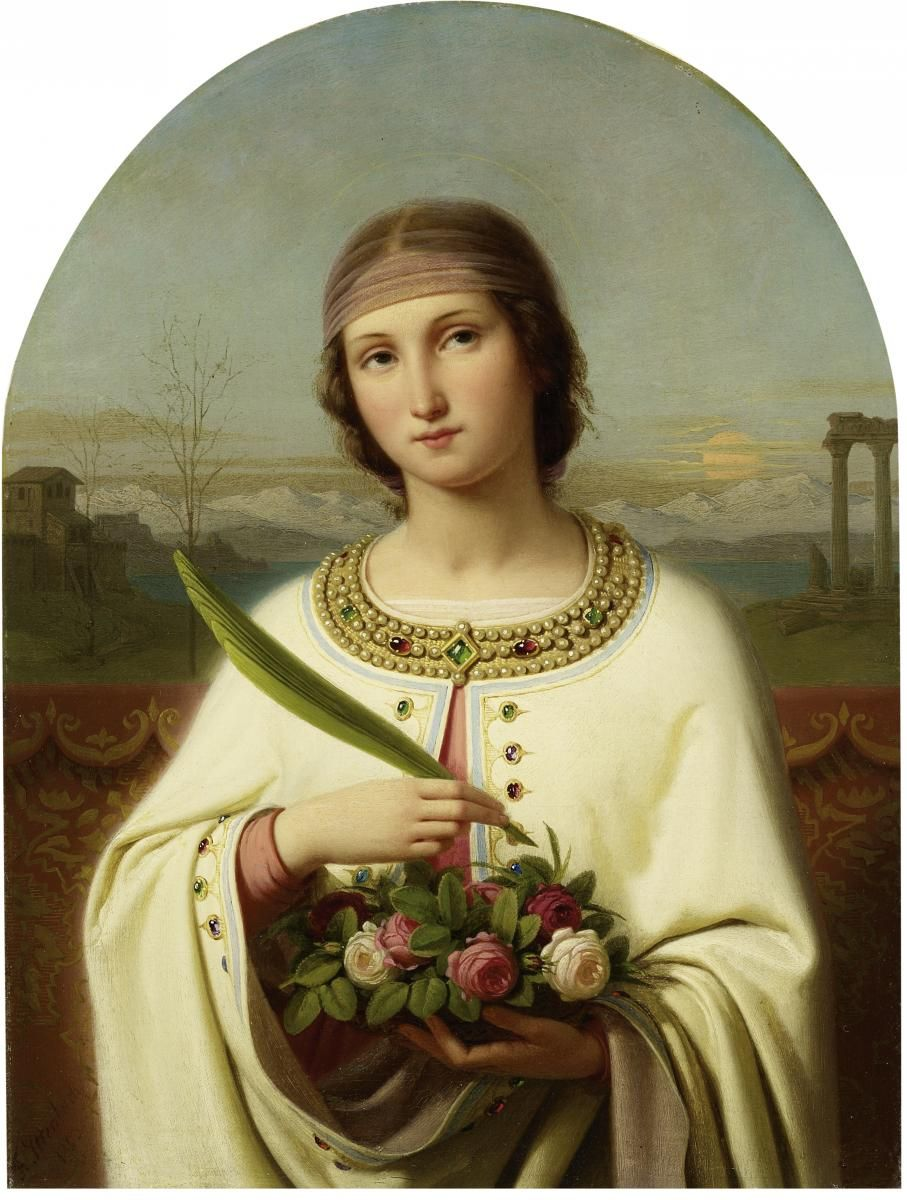
Daniel in the lions' den

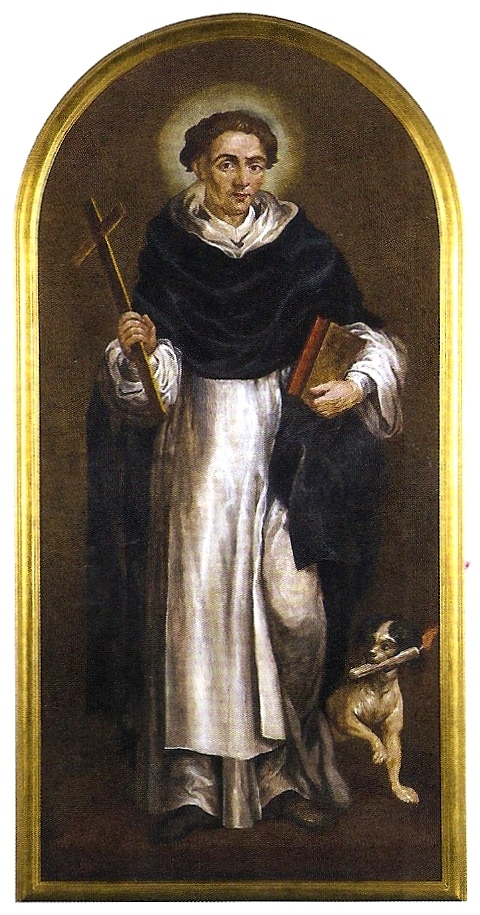
Saint Dominic with dog and torch

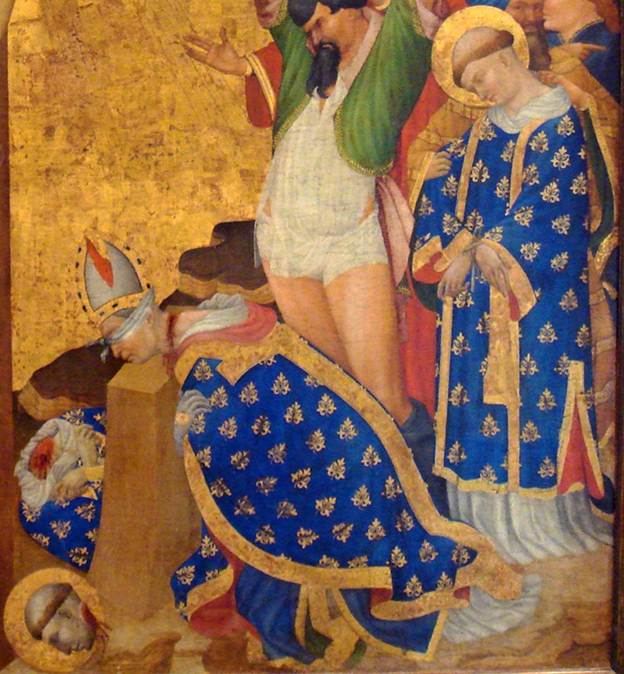
the martyrdom of Saint Denis

Article title	Attributes
Dagobert II	King with a nail in his hand
Daniel	Often in the lions' den^{[a]}
Daniel of Padua	deacon's vestments, holding a towel and laver
Dathus	Dove
David	Psalms, Harp, Head of Goliath
David/Dewi	Bishop with a dove,^{[a]} usually on his shoulder, sometimes standing, on a raised hillock
David of Scotland	king with sword or sceptre^{[a]}
David of Munktorp	Abbot's staff, book, biretta
Defendens	military attire
Deicolus	as a hermit, a wild boar hunted by King Clothaire takes refuge at his feet
Demetrius of Sirmium	deacon's vestments, martyr's palm, crucifix, with a scorpion next to him
Demetrius of Thessaloniki	armour of a Roman soldier, spear, seated on a red horse^{[a]}
Demiana	garments of a Christian virgin, martyr's palm, martyr's cross, with 40 other virgins
Denis of the Nativity	Discalced Carmelite habit
Denis of Paris	Christian Martyrdom, carrying his severed head in his hands; a bishop's mitre; city
Denise, Dativa, Leontia, Tertius, Emilianus, Boniface, Majoricus, and Servus	Martyr's palm, Crown of martyrdom
Deodatus of Nevers	with hand stretching to thunder clouds or exorcising a woman
Devasahayam Pillai	Tied up in chains Praying on knees before execution
Devota	crown of roses, dove, boat, coat-of-arms of the Principality of Monaco; dead maiden in a boat on the sea with a dove flying ahead of it
Didacus of Alcalá	tunic full of roses
Dimitry of Rostov	Vested as a bishop, right hand raised in blessing
Dina Bosatta	Crucifix
Dionysius the Areopagite	Vested as a bishop, holding a Gospel Book
Dmitry Donskoy	sword and helmet
Dom Justo Takayama	Sword|Crucifix, Samurai robes, Martyr's palm
Domenico Lentini	Crucifix, Book of Hours, Priest's attire
Domenico Mazzarella	Franciscan habit
Domenico Spadafora	Dominican habit
Domingo Iturrate Zubero	Trinitarian habit
Dominic	rosary,^{[a]} lily in his hand, star over his head
Dominic Barberi	Passionist Habit and Sign
Dominic de la Calzada	hen and rooster, habit of a hermit, prayer beads, shepherd's crook^{[b]}
Dominic Loricatus	his coat of mail lying on the ground
Dominic of Silos	abbot surrounded by the Seven Virtues; mitred abbot enthroned with a book, a veil tied to his crozier, as proper to an abbot
Domitian of Carantania	with: sword, crown, idol in hands
Domnius	bishop holding the city of Split or the Cathedral of Saint Domnius
Domninus of Fidenza	dog, cup, martyr's palm; soldier's attire
Donatus of Arezzo	episcopal dress, chalice, sword, fighting a dragon
Donatus of Fiesole	bishop's attire with an Irish wolfhound at his feet, pointing out a church to his deacon Andrew the Scot
Donatus of Muenstereifel	Roman armor; lightning bolt; martyr's palm; grapevine
Donizetti Tavares de Lima	Priest's cassock
Đorđe Bogić	Vested as a protopresbyter
Doroteo Hernández Vera	Priest's cassock
Dorothea of Caesarea	basket with flowers or fruits
Dorotheus of Tyre	traditionally credited with an Acts of the Seventy Apostles
Drogo	Benedictine habit, sheep, shepherd
Dubricius	holding two crosiers and an archiepiscopal cross
Dulce de Souza Lopes Pontes	Religious habit of the Missionary Sisters of the Immaculate Conception of the Mother of God
Duns Scotus	Books, a vision of the Blessed Virgin Mary, the moon on the chest of a Franciscan friar
Dunstan	hammer, tongs^{[a]}
Dymphna	crown, sword, lily, lamp, princess with a fettered devil at her feet^{[a]}

=== E ===
E
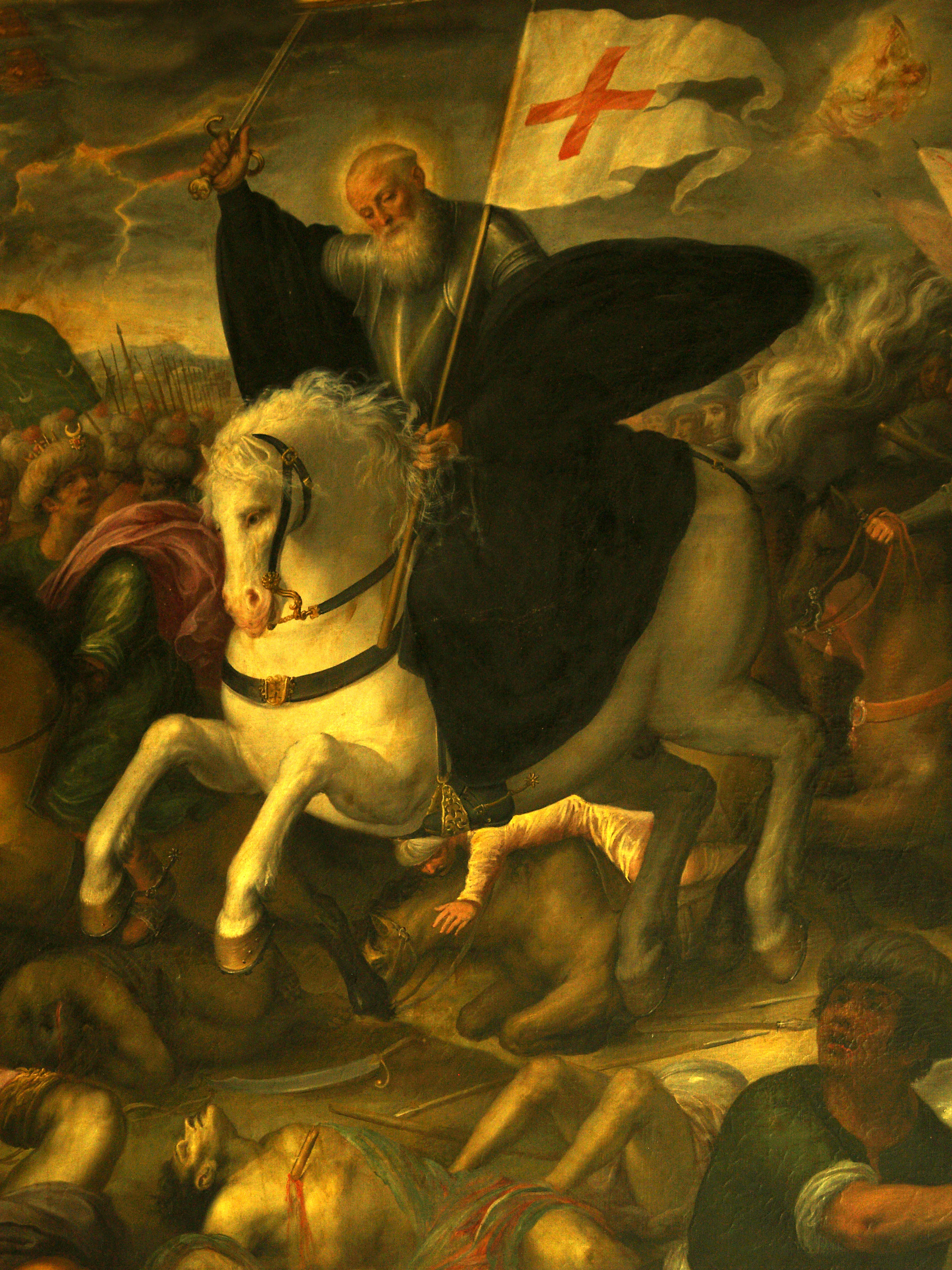
Emilian of Cogolla in the Battle of Simancas

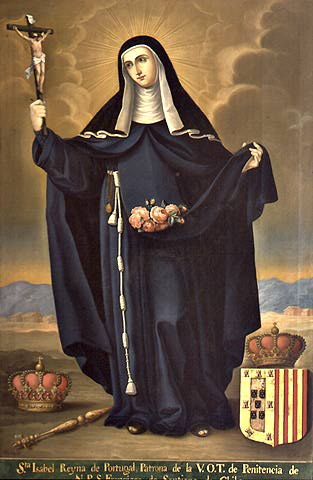
Elisabeth of Portugal in the habit of the Third order of Saint Francis, raising a cross and holding a bunch of roses in her scapular. Two crowns, a sceptre, and a coat of arms are beneath her feet.

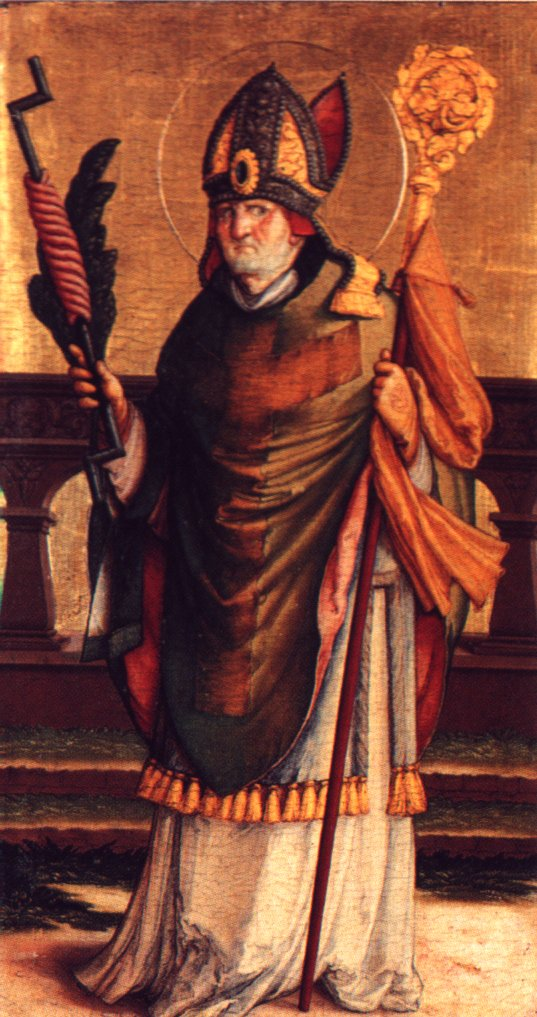
Erasmus holding a windlass

Saint	Symbol
Eanswith	crown, staff, book and sometimes a fish
Earconwald	bishop travelling in a chariot^{[a]}
Edmund Campion	Knife in chest, noose around neck
Edmund Ignatius Rice	Irish Christian Brothers' Black Habit
Edmund the Martyr	quiver of arrows^{[a]}
Edward the Confessor	king crowned with a nimbus and holding a sceptre^{[a]}
Egwin of Evesham	bishop holding a fish and a key
Elena Guerra	Religious habit, Crucifix
Elena Spirgevičiūtė	Martyr's palm, Lily flower, Rosary
Elena Valentinis	Augustinian habit
Eleutherius and Antia	Martyr's palm
Eligius	bishop portrayed with a crosier in his right hand, on the open palm of his left a miniature church of chased gold; with a hammer, anvil, and horseshoe; or with a horse^{[a]}
Elijah	habit and mantle of the Carmelites, cave, scroll, chariot of fire^{[a]}
Eliphius	Bishop's attire, with his head in his hands
Elisa Angela Meneguzzi	Religious habit
Élisabeth Bruyère	Religious habit
Élisabeth Eppinger	Religious habit
Élisabeth Leseur	Rosary
Elisabetta Maria Satellico	Poor Clare habit
Elisabetta Picenardi	Servite habit, Lilies
Elisabetta Sanna	Rosary
Elisabetta Vendramini	Religious habit
Eliswa Vakayil	Carmelite habit, hands folded in prayer
Elisabeth of Hungary	alms, flowers, bread, poor people, pitcher^{[a]}
Elisabeth of Portugal	crowns, roses, habit of a Third order Franciscan sister, crucifix^{[a]}
Elizabeth of the Trinity	Religious habit
Elpidius the Cappadocian	vine in leaf in winter
Elvira Moragas Cantarero	Discalced Carmelite habit, Crucifix, Palm, Mortar and pestle
Elzéar of Sabran	knotted cord and lily; coronet at his feet
Emerentiana	young woman with stones in her lap and lilies in her hand; young lady being stoned to death
Emeric	Boar, Lily Stem, Sword
Emeterius and Celedonius	soldier's attire
Emil Kapaun	Chaplain cross, combat boots, Mass vestments Rosary
Emil Szramek	martyr's palm, rosary
Emilia Bicchieri	Dominican habit
Émilie de Villeneuve	Religious habit
Émilie d'Oultremont	Religious habit
Emilianus	riding into battle in the robe of a hermit^{[a]}
Euthymia Üffing (Blessed)	Religious habit of the Sisters of Charity of the Blessed Virgin and Our Lady of Sorrows
Emmelia of Caesarea	Mother of Saints
Emmeram of Regensburg	a ladder
Emygdius	episcopal robes; palm; supporting a crumbling wall or building
Engelbert II of Berg	a crosier in one hand, with an upraised sword, in the other, piercing a crescent moon
Engelmar Unzeitig	Cassock
Engelmund of Velsen	a pilgrim abbot with a fountain springing under his staff.
Engratia	martyr's palm, crown; noble attire being flagellated
Enrichetta Alfieri	Religious habit
Enrico Rebuschini	Priest's cassock
Enrique de Ossó i Cervelló	Priest's cassock
Enzo Boschetti	Priest's cassock
Epaphras	Christian Martyrdom
Epiphanius of Salamis	Vested as a bishop in omophorion, sometimes holding a scroll
Ephrem the Syriac	Vine and scroll, deacon's vestments and thurible; with Saint Basil the Great; composing hymns with a lyre
Equitius	holds the model of a monastery
Erasmus of Formia	represented with his entrails wound on a windlass, or as a vested bishop holding a winch or windlass^{[a]}
Eric of Sweden	king being martyred at Mass^{[a]}
Escrava Anastacia	African woman, blue eyes, facemask
Eskil	episcopal attire; three stones
Etchen	farming
Eugenia Maria Ravasco	Religious habit
Eugénie Joubert	Religious habit
Eugenio Reffo	Priest's cassock
Eulalia of Barcelona	X-shaped cross
Eulalia of Mérida	martyr's cross, stake, and dove
Euphemia	Clothed as a pious woman with her head covered, surrounded by one or a few lions, often holding a wheel or a martyr's cross
Euphrasia Eluvathingal	Religious habit
Euphrasius of Illiturgis	episcopal attire
Eusebia Palomino Yenes	Religious habit
Eusebius of Esztergom	Priest's attire
Eustace	hunting clothes, shining cross or crucifix between the antlers of a stag, bull, horn, oven^{[a]}
Eustochia Smeralda Calafato	Poor Clare nun holding a cross
Evasius	Crozier and Mitre
Expeditus	attire of a Roman centurion, martyr's palm, raising a cross with the word hodie ("today") on it in his right hand, with his left foot stepping on a crow, which is speaking the word cras ("tomorrow").
Exuperantius of Cingoli	banner, book
Exuperius (Theban Legion)	military attire

=== F ===
F
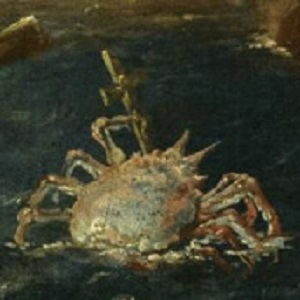
Crab with crucifix as an attribute of Saint Francis Xavier

Cross of Saint Florian

Saint	Symbol
Faith	martyr's cross, gridiron, rods, sword^{[a]}
Faustinus and Jovita	an angel saving them from drowning
Febronia of Nisibis	martyr's palm and the shears used to cut off her breasts
Felician of Foligno	old bishop with holes bored through his feet and hands
Felicitas of Rome	sword and seven sons
Felix of Burgundy	anchor^{[a]}
Felix of Cantalice	Capuchin holding the Baby Jesus
Felix of Valois	white stag with cross between its horns
Fiacre	spade, basket of vegetables^{[a]}
Fidelis of Como	Military attire
Fidelis of Sigmaringen	sword; palm of martyrdom; heretics; the Morning Star; trampling on the word "heresy"; with a club set with spikes; with a whirlbat; with an angel carrying a palm of martyrdom; with Saint Joseph of Leonessa
Filippo Rinaldi	Priest's attire
Filippo Smaldone	cassock
Fina	violets
Fiorina Cecchin	Religious habit
Firmina	martyr's palm
Florian	Cross of Saint Florian; Armour of a Roman soldier; pitcher of water; pouring water over fire
Florinus of Remüs	bottle, glass of wine^{[a]}
Foillan	Represented with a crown at his feet to show that he despised the honors of the world
Fortunatus of Casei	Military attire, bishop's vestments
Fourteen Holy Helpers	Saints Acacius, Barbara, Blaise, Christopher, Cyriacus, Catherine of Alexandria, Denis, Erasmus of Formiae, Eustace, George, Giles, Margaret of Antioch, Pantaleon, and Vitus, shown as a group.^{[b]}
Francesco Convertini	Priest's cassock
Francesco Gattola	Priest's cassockZucchetto
Francesco Lippi	Carmelite habit, Rosary, Ball and Chain
Francesco Maria da Camporosso	Capuchin habit
Francesco Maria di Francia	Priest's cassock
Francesco Maria Greco	Cassock
Francesco Marinoni	Priest's cassock, Crucifix, Theatine habit
Francesco Mottola	Priest's cassock, Crucifix
Francesco Paleari	Priest's cassock
Francesco Pianzola	Priest's cassock
Francesco Spinelli	Priest's cassock
Francesco Zirano	Franciscan habit
Francinaina Cirer Carbonell	Religious habit, Crucifix
Francis Borgia	Skull crowned with an emperor's diadem
Francis de Sales	Heart of Jesus, Crown of Thorns
Francis Mary of the Cross Jordan	Priest's cassock
Francis of Assisi	habit of the Franciscans, wolf, birds, fish, skull, stigmata^{[a]}
Francis of Fabriano	Franciscan habit
Francis Regis Clet	Priest's cassock Crucifix; Palm branch
Francis Solanus	Franciscan habit
Francis Xavier	crucifix, bell, vessel, crab with a crucifix^{[a]}
Francisco Blanco (martyr)	Franciscan habit, crossed spears
Francisco Coll Guitart	Dominican habit
Francisco de Paula Victor	Priest's cassock
Francisco Gárate Aranguren	Rosary
Francisco Martín Fernández de Posadas	Dominican habit
Franciszka Siedliska	Religious habit
Françoise d'Amboise	Carmelite habit, Crucifix, Crown
François-Léon Clergue	Franciscan habit
Frank Duff	Rosary, Vexillium Legionis
Franz Alexander Kern	Premonstratensian habit
Fridianus	rake, hoe
Frithuswith	pastoral staff; a fountain; the ox
Fructuosus of Braga	Monk with a stag
Fulton J. Sheen	Ferraiolo, zucchetto, bishop's cassock
Fursey	with two oxen at his feet, beholding a vision of angels, gazing at the flames of purgatory and hell
Fyodor Ushakov	Admiral attire, telescope, scroll, medals

=== G ===
G
Saint George and the Dragon

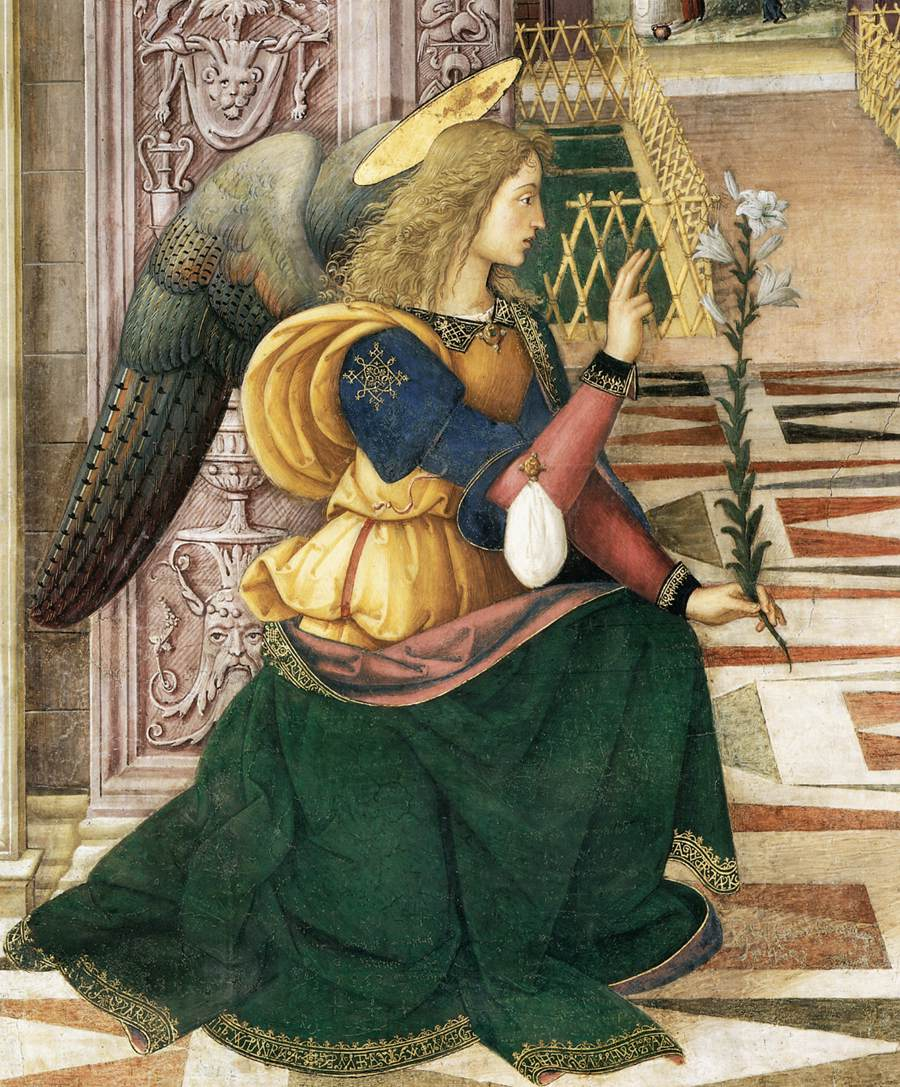
White lily as an attribute of Saint Gabriel the Archangel

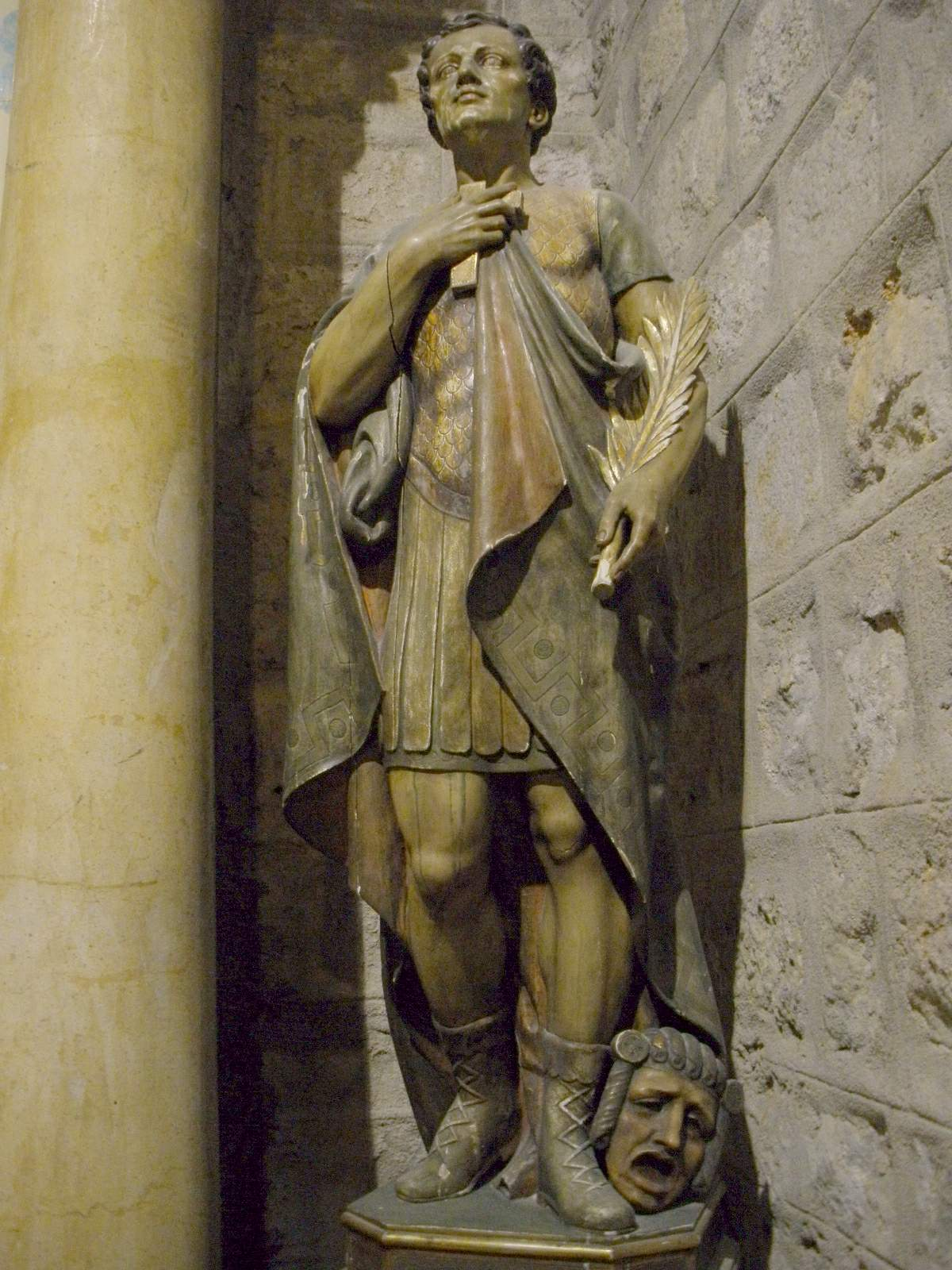
Saint Genesius with theatrical mask

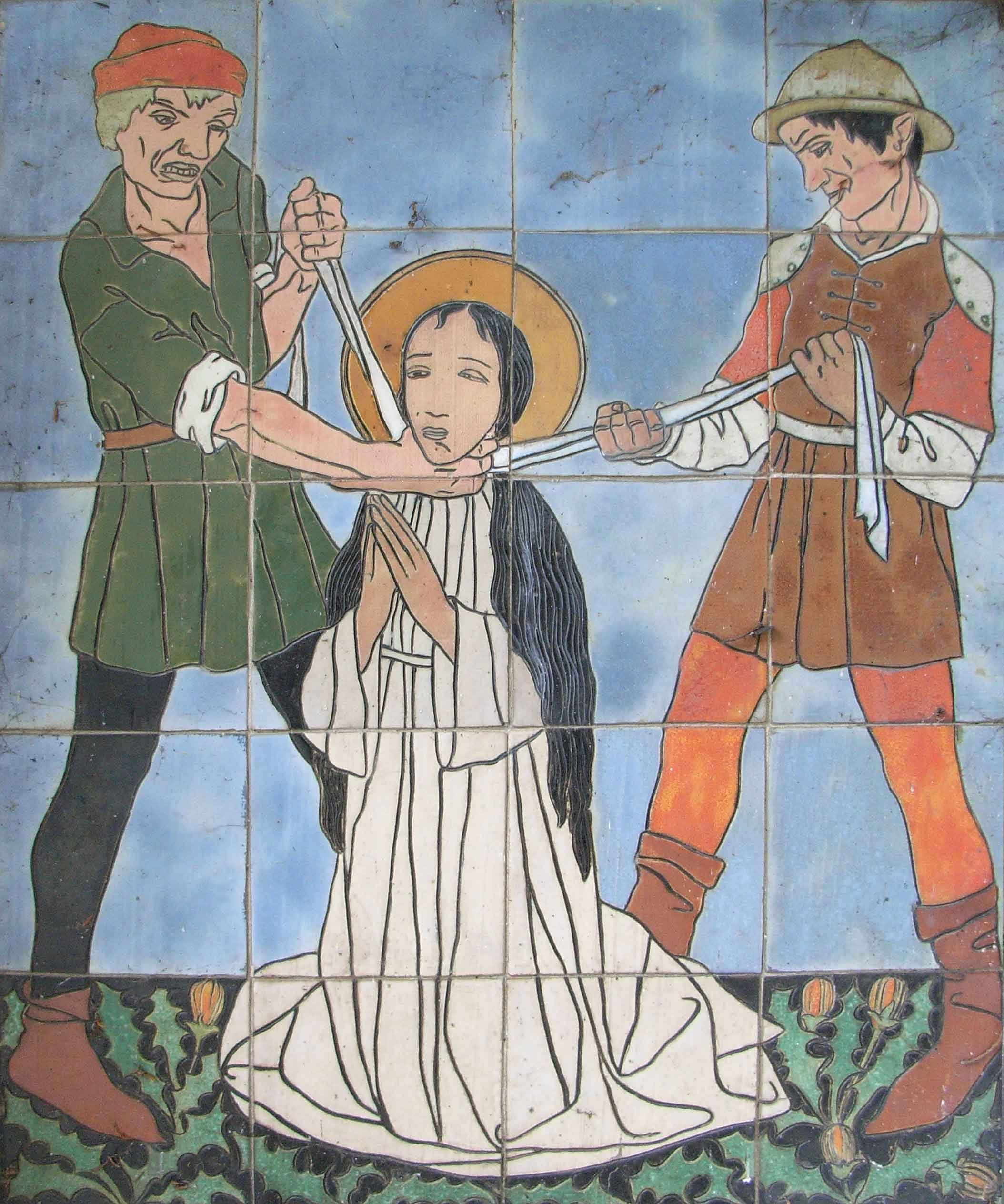
Strangulation of Godelieve

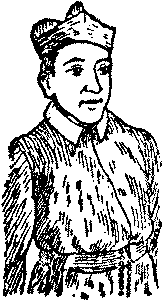
Redemptorist habit

Cross portate

Saint	Symbol
Gabriel	Archangel; Clothed in blue or white garments, carrying a white lily, a trumpet, a shining lantern, a branch from Paradise, a scroll, and a scepter scroll stating "Ave Maria Gratia Plena"^{[a]}
Gall	Portrayed as an abbot blessing a bear that brings him a log of wood; may be shown holding a hermit's tau staff with the bear or carrying a loaf and a pilgrim's staff.
Gallicanus	hanging his armor on a cross
Gangulphus	Pictured as a Burgundian knight with a fountain springing under his sword. He holds a shield with a cross. He may also hold the spear with which he was murdered
Gauchito Gil	Gaucho standing in front of a red cross, holding a bola or a red cross, red bandana, blue poncho, Prosopis caldenia
Gaudentius of Novara	Bishop holding a model of a church
Gaugericus	bishop, mitre on head, without his crosier, right hand lifted in a gesture of benediction and left folded upon his breast.
Gebhard of Constance	bishop giving his staff to a lame man
Geltrude Comensoli	holding a Monstrance, Genuflecting or Kneeling to the Blessed Sacrament
Geminianus	a bishop holding a model of the town of Modena
Gemma Galgani	Passionist robe, flowers (lilies and roses), crucifix, stigmata, heavenward gaze, passionist sign
Genesius of Arles	a secretary throwing down his tablets
Genesius	theatre mask^{[a]}
Genevieve	lit candle, bread, keys, herd, cattle^{[a]}
Gennaro Maria Sarnelli	Priest's cassock, crucifix
Genoveva Torres Morales	Religious habit, Scapular
George	Clothed as a crusader in plate armour or mail, often bearing a lance tipped by a cross, riding a white horse, often slaying a dragon. In the Greek East and Latin West he is shown with St George's Cross emblazoned on his armour, or shield or banner.^{[a]}
George Preca	Priest's attire
Georgia of Clermont	a flock of doves accompanying her corpse
Gerard Majella	Young man in a Redemptorist habit, skull
Gerard of Csanád	Bishop being killed by a spear^{[a]}
Gerard of Villamagna	Franciscan habit, Habit of the Order of St. John, Maltese cross, staff, rosary, cherries
Gerardo Cagnoli	Franciscan habit
Gerardo dei Tintori	Stick with cherries, bowl with spoon
Gerebern	Palm and lance
Gereon	attire of a knight or Roman legionary
Gerhard Hirschfelder	Priest's attire
Gerlach	garments of a hermit, praying near his hermitage in a tree, with a donkey near him, thorn in his foot
Gertrude of Nivelles	A nun with a crosier and rats (now sometimes cats)
Gertrude Prosperi	Benedictine habit, Crucifix
Gertrude the Great	crown, lily, taper
Gervasius and Protasius	the scourge, the club and the sword^{[b]}
Ghébrē-Michael	Palm branch
Ghislain	represented with a bear or bear's cub beside him, sometimes portrayed holding a church
Giacomo Bianconi	Dominican habit
Giacomo Cusmano	Priest's cassock
Gilbert Nicolas	Franciscan habit, staff, Crucifix
Gilbert of Sempringham	cross portate
Gildas	Monk holding a Celtic bell or writing in a book
Giles	arrow, crosier, hermitage, hind^{[a]}
Ginepro Cocchi	Capuchin habit
Gioacchino La Lomia	Franciscan habit
Giocondo Pio Lorgna	Dominican habit
Giovanna da Orvieto	Dominican habit, Flowers
Giovanna Francesca Michelotti	Nun's habit, Heart
Giovanna Maria Bonomo	Religious habit
Giovanna Scopelli	Carmelite habit
Giovannangelo Porro	Servite habit
Giovanni Battista de' Rossi	Priest's attire, Crucifix
Giovanni Battista Mazzucconi	Cassock, Crucifix
Giovanni Battista Piamarta	Rosary, Christogram, Crucifix
Giovanni Battista Quilici	Priest's cassock
Giovanni Calabria	Priest's attire
Giovanni da Penna	Franciscan habit
Giovanni Fornasini	Priest's cassock, Palm branch
Giovanni Liccio	Dominican habit, crucifix
Giovanni Maria Boccardo	Priest's cassock, Stole
Giovanni Merlini	Priest's habit
Giovanni Pelingotto	Franciscan habit, staff, rosary
Giovanni Schiavo	Priest's attire
Giovannina Franchi	Religious habit
Giuditta Vannini	Religious habit
Giulia Crostarosa	Religious habit, Pendant of Jesus
Giulia della Rena	Augustinian habit, Flowers
Giulia Salzano	Religious habit, heart
Giulia Valle	Religious habit, Crucifix, Rosary
Giuliana Puricelli	Religious habit
Giuseppa Scandola	Religious habit of the Comboni Missionary Sisters
Giuseppe Allamano	cassock
Giuseppe Baldo (priest)	cassock
Giuseppe Beschin	Franciscan habit
Giuseppe Castagnetti	Sandals, sash
Giuseppe Giaccardo	Priest's cassock
Giuseppe Girotti	Dominican habit
Giuseppe Marchetti	Priest's cassock
Giuseppe Marcinò	Capuchin habit, Rosary, crucifix
Giuseppe Moscati	White coat, stethoscope, cross
Giuseppe Nascimbeni	Cassock, crucifix
Giuseppe Oddi	Capuchin habit
Giuseppina Catanea	Discalced Carmelite habit
Giuseppina Gabriella Bonino	Religious habit
Giuseppina Nicoli	Religious habit
Giustino Russolillo	Priest's cassock
Goar of Aquitaine	Hermit being given milk by three hinds; holding a pitcher; with the devil on his shoulder or under his feet; holding the church of Saint Goar am Rhein; hanging his hat on a sunbeam
Godelieve	crown, well, being strangled^{[b]}
Godric of Finchale	Hermit
Gomidas Keumurdjian	Martyr's palm, Priest attire, book
Gondulph of Maastricht	with Monulph, both holding miniature churches
Gotthard of Hildesheim	dragon; model of a church
Govan	Celtic Rite
Gratus of Aosta	episcopal garb; head of Saint John the Baptist; bunch of grapes; bishop with lightning flashing near him
Gregorio Celli	Augustinian habit, Franciscan habit, crucifix, iron ring around the waist
Gregory the Great	papal tiara, crosier, dove (often portrayed at his ear)^{[a]}
Gregory of Nazianzus	balding with a bushy white beard, bishop's vestments, wearing an omophorion; holding a Gospel Book or scroll
Gregory Palamas	long, tapering dark beard, bishop's vestments, holding a Gospel Book or scroll, right hand raised in benediction
Gregory Thaumaturgus	bishop's vestments, driving demons out of a temple, presenting a bishop's mitre to Saint Alexander the Charcoal Burner
Grimoaldo of the Purification	Passionist habit
Gudula	lantern, which the devil tries to blow it out
Gundisalvus of Amarante	Dominican habit, Holding a ball, Light shining on him
Guy of Anderlecht	A peasant praying with an angel plowing a nearby field; a pilgrim with a book or with a hat, staff, rosary, and an ox at his feet
Guy Pierre de Fontgalland	Rosary
Gwynllyw	crowned warrior, carrying spear sometimes accompanied by an ox

=== H ===
H
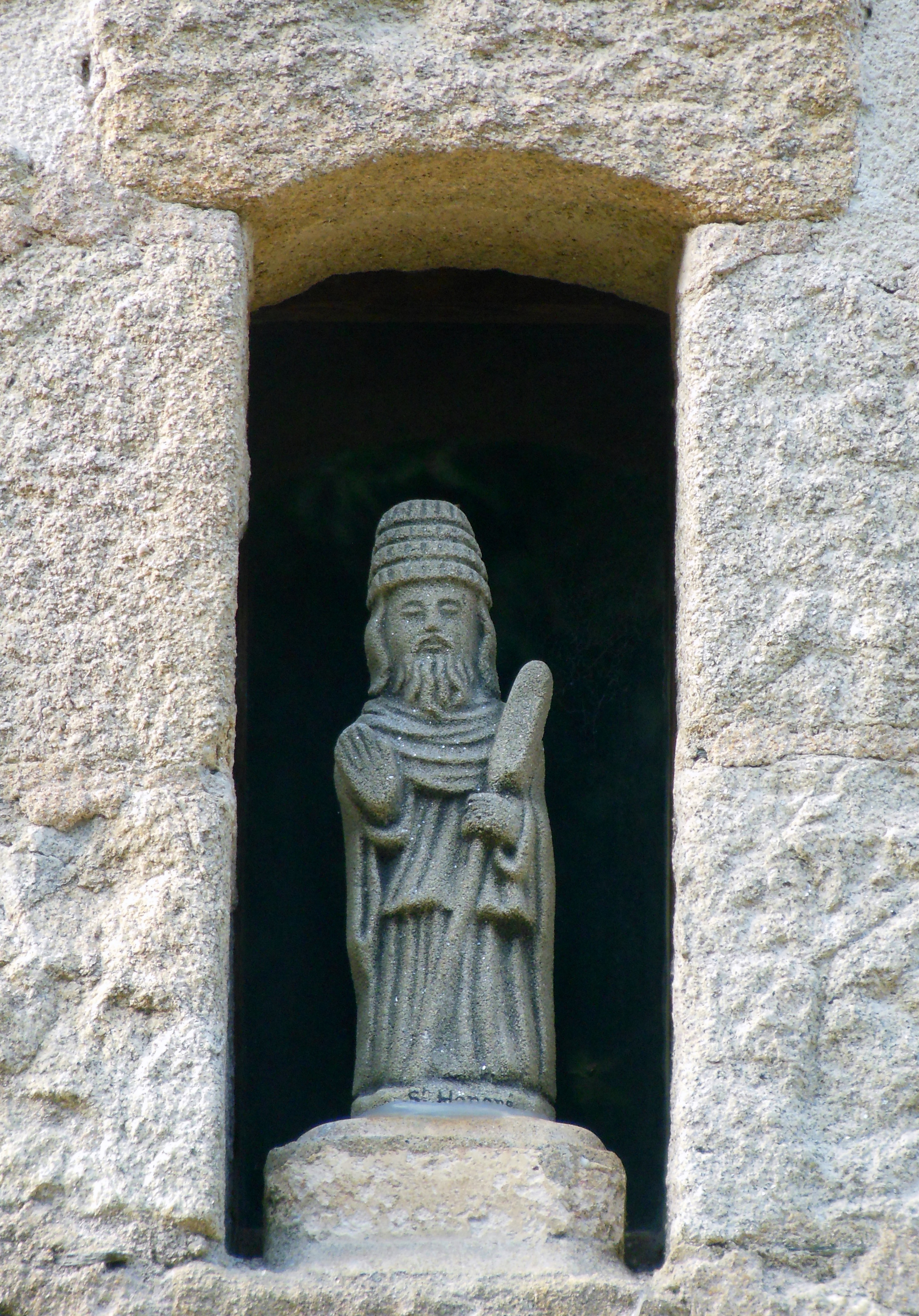
Honoratus of Amiens with a baker's peel

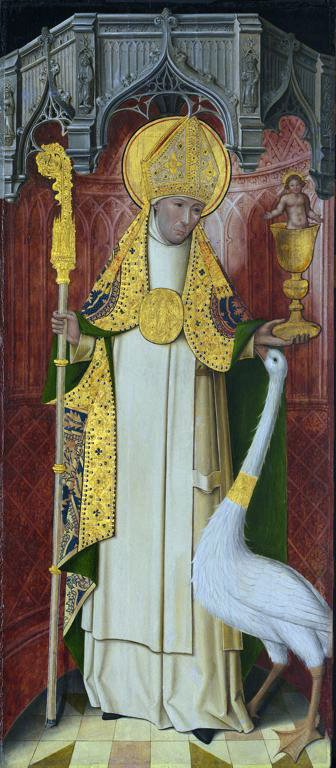
Saint Hugh of Lincoln with his attributes, among them the swan

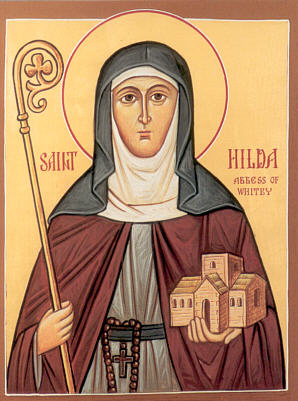
Saint Hilda holding a model of Whitby Abbey

Saint	Symbol
Habakkuk	a bowl of bread and potage (Daniel 14:33-49)^{[b]}
Hedwig of Silesia	holding a church or a pair of shoes in her hands
Helena	wearing a royal crown while supporting the True Cross^{[a]}
Helladius of Toledo	carrying straw or firewood to an oven
Henry II, Holy Roman Emperor	armor and mantle, sceptre and sword
Hermagoras of Aquileia	bishop's vestments^{[b]}
Hermann Joseph	kneeling before a statue of the Virgin and Child and offering an apple^{[a]}
Hermenegild	axe, crown, sword, and martyr's cross^{[b]}
Hermínio Pinzetta	Franciscan habit
Hermógenes López Coarchita	Priest's attire
Hermogius	Benedictine habit
Hervé	Blind abbot being led by a wolf^{[a]}
Hilary of Poitiers	episcopal vestments, crozier, beard, usually white and often long^{[b]}
Hilda of Whitby	with a pastoral staff and carrying an abbey church.
Hildegard of Bingen	habit of a Benedictine nun, crozier, with flames above her head, writing in her Liber Scivias, sitting in a hermitage ^{[b]}
Hiltrude of Liessies	lamp, candle
Himelin	pilgrim's attire, with a staff, or ill in bed
Himerius of Bosto	pilgrim's cloak and staff, being stabbed
Hippolytus of Rome	papal tiara^{[a]}
Hippolytus the soldier	military garb, horse's harness^{[a]}
Homobonus	Bag of money, merchant's robes
Honorat Koźmiński	Franciscan habit
Honoratus	represented as a bishop over the island of Lérins with a phoenix below, or drawing water from a rock with his mitre near him
Honoratus of Amiens	baker's peel or shovel; bishop with a large Host; bishop with three Hosts on a baker's shovel; loaves^{[a]}
Honorina	palm of martyrdom
Hospitius	in the garb of a hermit or monk
Hosea	bearded, raising his hand in benediction, holding a scroll with the words "Ex Egipto vocavi filium meum"
Hripsime	Martyr's palm, martyr's crown, martyr's cross
Hubertus	knight with a banner showing the stag's head and crucifix; stag; stag with a crucifix over its head; young courtier with two hounds
Hugh of Châteauneuf	wearing a cowl over his episcopal vestments
Hugh of Lincoln	episcopal vestments, crozier, swan^{[a]}
Humbert of Maroilles	A star on his forehead; a bear carrying Humbert's baggage; with an angel making a cross on Humbert's brow; with an angel showing Humbert the Cross
Humility	habit of the Vallombrosians^{[a]}
Hunegund of France	Sometimes represented kneeling at the feet of the pope
Hyacinth of Poland	Holding a statue of the Blessed Virgin Mary along with a monstrance or ciborium^{[b]}
Hyacintha Mariscotti	Religious habit

== See also ==
- Christian symbolism
- Arma Christi
- Animals in Christian art
- Plants in Christian iconography
