= List of encyclicals of Pope Clement XIII =

1758–1766 papal encyclicals

This article contains a list of encyclicals issued by Pope Clement XIII.

No.	Title (Latin)	Title (English translation)	Subject	Date
1.	Venimus in altitudinem			11 September 1758
2.	A quo die	"From the Day Which"	General Recommendations for Bishops	14 September 1758
3.	Pastoralis officii			21 March 1759
4.	Cum primum		Condemnation of certain corrupt practices among the clergy	17 September 1759
5.	Appetente sacro	"The sacred (season) approaching"	Reaffirmation of the rules about Lent fasting	20 December 1759
6.	In dominico agro	"In the Lord's Field"	Reaffirmation of the importance of the Council of Trent and the use of the Roman Catechism	14 June 1761
7.	Quanto in dolore			9 June 1762
8.	Ubi primum accepimus			14 January 1764
9.	Quanta auxilii			8 May 1765
10.	Quam graviter		Condemnation of Gallicanism	25 June 1766
11.	Christianae reipublicae	"Of the Christian community"	Condemnation of certain anti-Catholic publications	25 November 1766
12.	Summa Quae			6 January 1768
13.	Accedamus cum fiducia			25 June 1768
