= Giovanna Maria Bonomo =

Catholic nun

Blessed Giovanna Maria Bonomo O.S.B.

Religious; Mystic
- Born: 15 August 1606; Asiago, Vicenza, Republic of Venice
- Died: 1 March 1670 (aged 63); Bassano, Vicenza, Republic of Venice
- Venerated in: Catholic Church
- Beatified: 9 June 1783, Saint Peter's Basilica, Papal States by Pope Pius VI
- Feast: 26 February (Asiago); 1 March
- Attributes: Religious habit
- Patronage: Asiago; Bassano

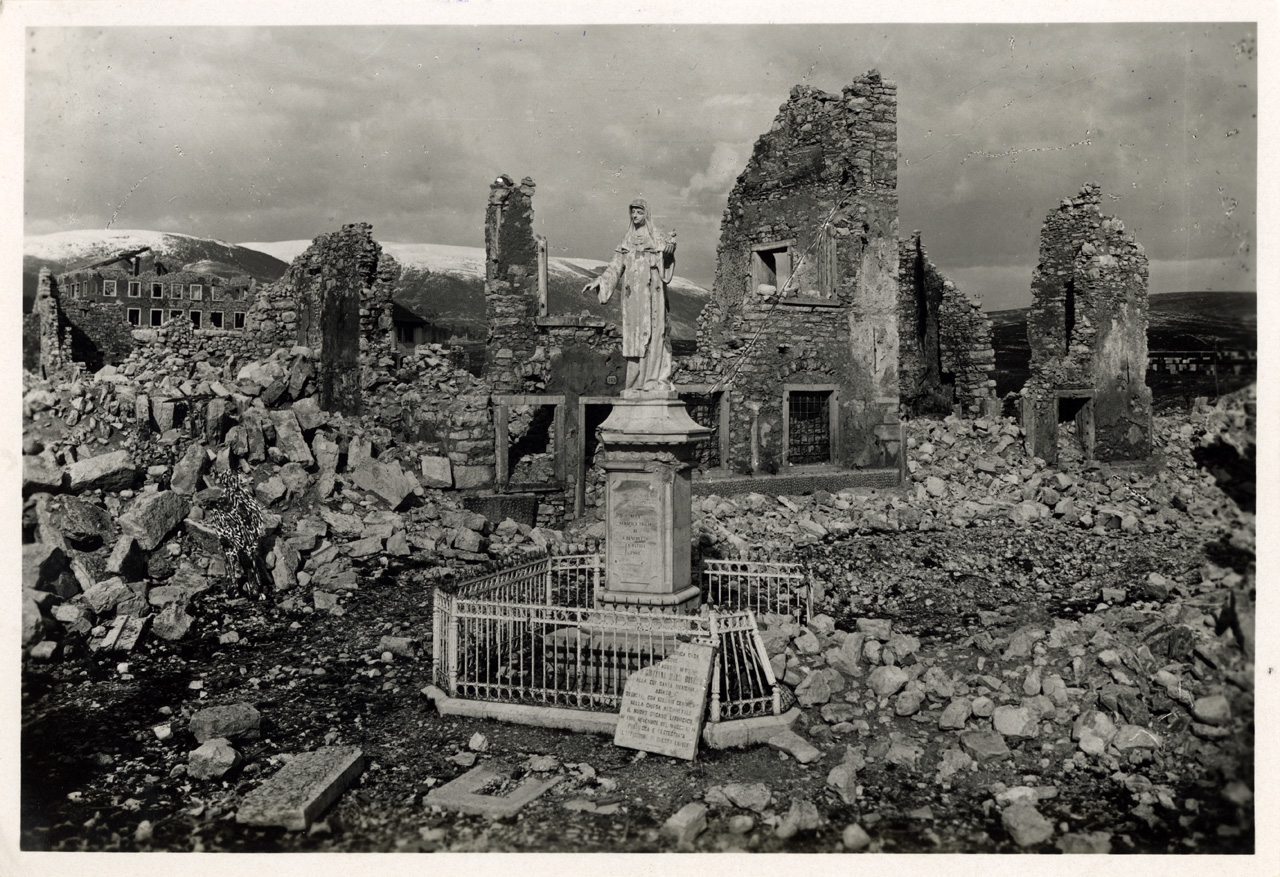
P28.232-01 Asiago. Monument of the Blessed Giovanna Maria Bonomo intact among the rubble.jpg

Giovanna Maria Bonomo (15 August 1606 – 1 March 1670) was a Catholic nun who was a professed member of the Benedictines. She was ridiculed for her dedication and her experiences as some believed them to be heretical or a need for attention.

She was beatified in 1783 after the recognition of two miracles that were found to have been attributed to her intercession.

== Life ==
Giovanna Maria Bonomo was born on 15 August 1606 in Vicenza to Giovanni Bonomo. Her mother died when she was six in 1612.

Her father took her to a convent in 1615 where she was educated. The Poor Clares in Trent educated her and she studied Latin. She received her First Communion at the age of nine. At the age of twelve she informed her father of her intention to become a nun and to remain in Trent. He at first was opposed but he relented after a short time.

She entered a Benedictine convent on 21 June 1621. She became a Benedictine nun in Bassano on 8 September 1622 and fell into an ecstatic state for the first time at her profession celebration. She was also believed to have obtained the stigmata.

She served as a novice mistress and later as a prioress. She also served as an abbess three times. She taught that holiness did not consist in great things but rather in simple and common things.

She died on 1 March 1670 with a formidable reputation for holiness.

== Beatification ==
The beatification process started in Vicenza on 1 September 1699 under Pope Innocent XII which conferred upon her the title of Servant of God. The local process closed in mid 1704 and was validated before it was evaluated in Rome.

Pope Clement XIII recognized her life of heroic virtue and proclaimed her to be Venerable on 21 December 1758. Pope Pius VI approved two miracles attributed to her intercession in mid 1780 and beatified her on 9 June 1783. To celebrate this event, some Benedictine monks from Perugia composed poems in honor of Bonomo.
