= Sebastian Maggi =

Dominican priest

Blessed Sebastian Maggi O.P.
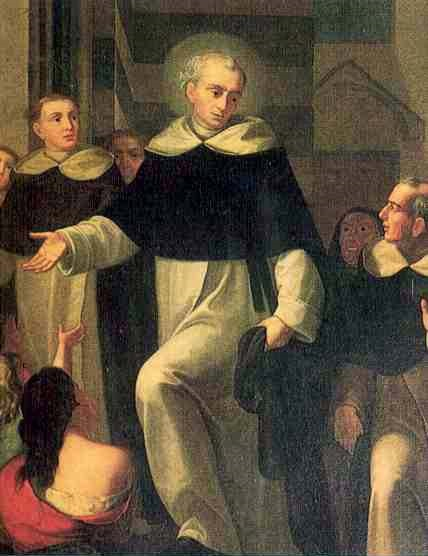
- Depiction by Francesco Zignago (1793)

Priest
- Born: 1414; Brescia, Duchy of Milan
- Died: 1496; Genoa, Republic of Genoa
- Venerated in: Roman Catholic Church
- Beatified: 15 April 1760, Saint Peter's Basilica, Papal States by Pope Clement XIII
- Feast: 16 December
- Attributes: Dominican habit

Sebastian Maggi (1414–1496) was an Italian Roman Catholic priest and a professed member of the Dominicans. Maggi also served as the confessor to both Girolamo Savonarola and Catherine of Genoa.

Pope Clement XIII beatified him on 15 April 1760.

== Life ==
Sebastian Maggi was born in Brescia to nobles in 1414. He is related to Bishop Berardo Maggi, who was also the Duke and Count of Brescia.

Maggi began his work in 1429 when he joined the Order of Preachers. His intelligence was noticed, and he later received a master's degree in theological studies. He rose through the ranks and became the superior of several religious Dominican houses. He practised corporal mortification and was strict in discipline. He would often tell his subordinates: "When you have committed a fault, come to me, not as prior, but as your father. If you will not have me as a father, you will find me a severe judge."

He appointed the monk Girolamo Savonarola to the position of novice master and set that famous Florentine friar on his own path to fame. In his time, he was regarded as one of the greatest preachers in the Italian state.

Pope Alexander VI chose Father Maggi to investigate revelations that Savonarola claimed were given to him directly from God. Savonarola appealed the choice and believed that Sebastian - as Vicar-General of the Lombard Congregation - would be biased and try to take over his recently emancipated "San Marco" facility in Florence. Alexander VI, however, had already decided to give the facility back to the Congregation, making Sebastian Savonarola's canonical superior.

He died in 1496. He is buried at the Dominican "Santa Maria di Castello" complex in Genoa. In 1963, his remains were still found to be incorrupt.
