= Francesco Marinoni =

Italian Roman Catholic priest

Blessed Francesco Marinoni CR
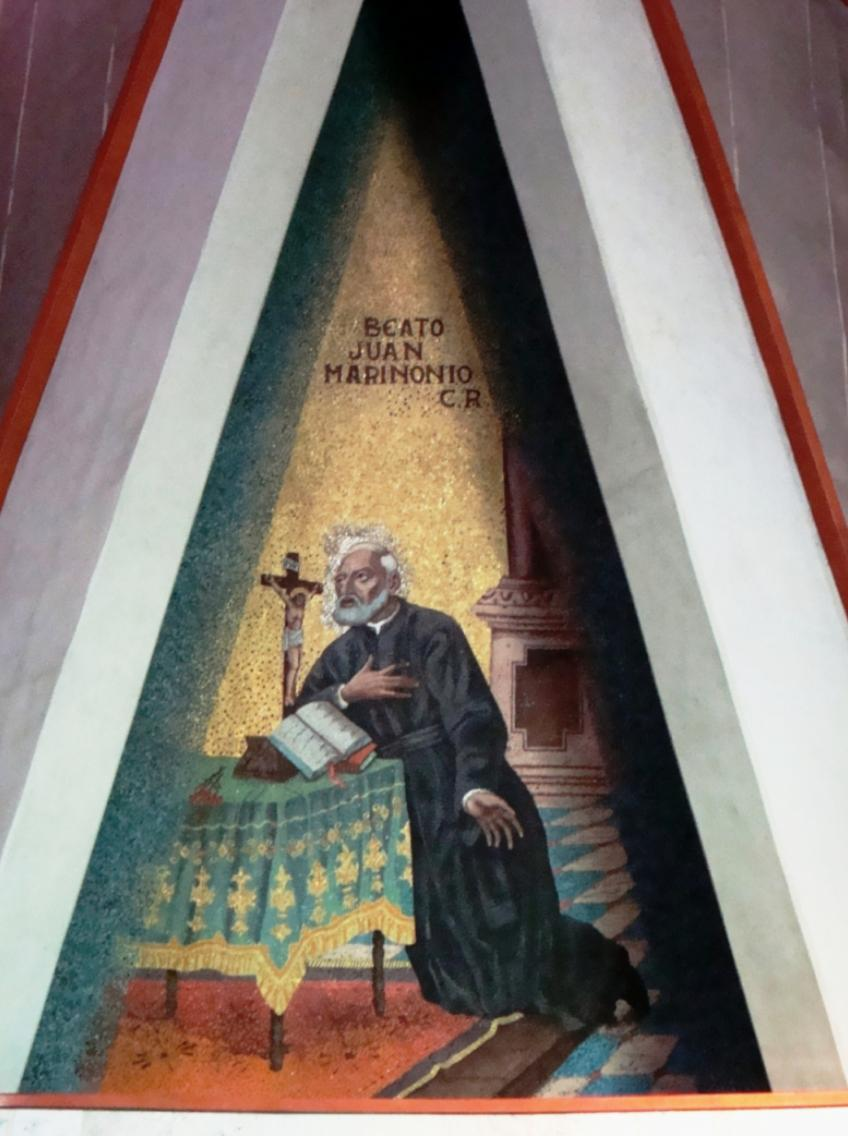

Priest
- Born: 25 December 1490; Venice, Republic of Venice
- Died: 31 December 1562 (aged 72); Naples, Kingdom of Naples
- Venerated in: Roman Catholic Church
- Beatified: 5 December 1764, Saint Peter's Basilica, Papal States by Pope Clement XIII
- Feast: 13 December

Francesco Marinoni (25 December 1490 – 13 December 1562) was an Italian Roman Catholic priest who was a member of the Theatines. He assumed the name Giovanni upon his admittance into the order. His cult was confirmed and acted as his formal beatification in 1764 under Pope Clement XIII. His life of heroic virtue was approved and Pope Benedict XVI added the title of Venerable to him despite the fact he was beatified. A miracle - now under investigation - is needed for his canonization.

== Life ==
Francesco Marinoni was born in Venice on 25 December 1490. He was a diligent student and studied for the priesthood in Padua where he was ordained.

Marinoni served as a canon of Saint Mark's Cathedral in Venice. He retired this post to work with Saint Cajetan who had established the Theatines. He became member of that order on 9 December 1528 and assumed the name of "Giovanni". He received his habit from Cardinal Giovanni Pietro Carafa - the future Pope Paul IV. He was the spiritual director of Cardinal Paolo Burali d'Arezzo - future Blessed.

In August 1533 he left Venice for Naples at the request of Pope Clement VII and remained there to direct the faithful. He also made an attempt to strengthen the faith and to prevent unorthodox views from taking root. He was appointed as the Superior of the House of San Paolo Maggiore in April 1540 and served as the spiritual director of a Dominican convent. He also served as a spiritual advisor to Saint Andrew Avellino. Avellino made reference to Marinoni as a great saint.

Pope Paul IV wanted to bestow upon him the archbishopric of Naples but he refused it.

His age and disease undermined him as he continued to work for others in Naples and the cholera epidemic that spread overcame him in 1562 which led to his death on 13 December 1562.

== Beatification ==
The beatification process commenced in Venice and granted him the title of Servant of God. Pope Clement XIII beatified him on 5 December 1764 after the approval of his cult.

The cause resumed on 25 June 2004 under Pope John Paul II and closed on 3 June 2005. The process was validated on 30 November 2006 and the Positio was submitted to the Congregation for the Causes of Saints in Rome in 2008 for evaluation.

Pope Benedict XVI recognized his life of heroic virtue and conferred upon him the title of Venerable on 27 June 2011. This cleared the hurdle needed for his canonization. The miracle attributed to him was investigated and was ratified on 17 October 2008. The Rome-based medical board that advises the Congregation approved the miracle as such on 9 October 2014.
