= Hermógenes López Coarchita =

Guatemalan Catholic Church priest

Servant of God Hermógenes López Coarchita
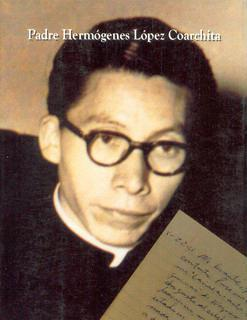
- Born: 16 September 1928; Ciudad Vieja, Sacatepéquez, Guatemala
- Died: 30 June 1978 (aged 49); Guatemala City, Guatemala

Hermógenes López Coarchita (16 September 1928 - 30 June 1978) was a Guatemalan Roman Catholic priest. He served as the pastor for the San José de Pinula parish since the late 1960s until his murder in mid-1978 due to his consistent championing of human rights and in particular his demand that all Guatemalans have the basic right to access clean water. His constant speaking out against corruption and regime abuses led to his enemies planning to kill him in an effort to subdue potential rebellion in the region.

The beatification process for the late priest opened in 2007 under Pope Benedict XVI and he became titled as a Servant of God at the cause's onset.

== Life ==
Hermógenes López Coarchita was born in Guatemala on 16 September 1928 to Ángel López Hernández and Victoria Coarchita Santa Cruz. He was baptized in the parish church in Ciudad Vieja on 20 September 1928 and his godmother was Eusebia Coarchita.

In 1943, Coarchita began his studies for the priesthood in the capital and in 1951 departed for San Salvador for his theological studies; he returned to his native home in 1954. He received his ordination to the priesthood on 7 November 1954 in the archdiocesan cathedral from Archbishop Mariano Rossell Arellano. His first assignment following his ordination was to serve as a spiritual director in the capital before becoming a chaplain in the Nuestra Señora de Fátima church and later as an assistant pastor of La Florida both in the nation's capital.

Coarchita was appointed as parish priest for the San José de Pinula parish on 28 November 1966 and set himself on learning about the conditions of the people in order to know how better to provide for their spiritual and material needs and also sought to focus on the older members of his parish. He also became part of a group of writers working for the small newspaper outlet Vocero Quincenal. Coarchita dedicated his priesthood to care for the poorest in his parish which included those who were from indigenous populations. He defended the right for people to access clean and fresh water which became a common theme in his preaching. Coarchita also opposed the sterilization of women for birth control campaigns seeing them as going against the dignities and rights of women.

Coarchita was murdered on 30 June 1978 around 11:00am in the San Luis town. Coarchita was near Los Cerritos in the San Luis town four kilometers from his parish along the road to Palencia in the morning driving his red pick-up truck when armed individuals waited for him and stopped his vehicle before shooting him several times in the chest. He had been returning from visiting two sick parishioners. He had been murdered due to his constant opposition to corruption fearing a popular revolt and so hoped killing him would subdue potential rebellion. His remains are now interred on the right side of his church and are clothed in a black cassock with a stole bearing spots of blood from when he was murdered.

== Beatification process ==
The beatification process was launched under Pope Benedict XVI on 20 July 2007 after the Congregation for the Causes of Saints issued the official "nihil obstat" decree (meaning no objections to the cause) and titled Coarchita as a Servant of God. The diocesan process was launched in the nation's archdiocese on 27 December 2007 and was later closed on 22 June 2013. The Congregation for the Causes of Saints validated this process on 10 October 2014.
