= Angelo Agostini Mazzinghi =

Italian Roman Catholic priest (1377–1438)

Blessed Angelo Agostini Mazzinghi O.Carm
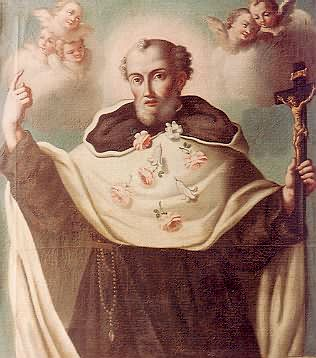
- Portrait.

Priest
- Born: 1385; Florence, Republic of Florence
- Died: 17 August 1438 (aged 53); Florence, Republic of Florence
- Resting place: Santa Maria del Carmine, Italy
- Venerated in: Roman Catholic Church
- Beatified: 7 March 1761, Saint Peter's Basilica, Papal States by Pope Clement XIII
- Feast: 16 August
- Attributes: Flowers; Wreath; Rosary; Crucifix; Carmelite habit
- Patronage: Preachers

Angelo Agostini Mazzinghi, O.Carm (1385 – 17 August 1438) was an Italian Catholic priest and Carmelite friar. He was a noted preacher from Florence and was known for his pious devotion to the Carmelite Rule and to the spread of the gospel.

Pope Clement XIII beatified Mazzinghi on 7 March 1761; he remains a patron of preachers.

== Life ==
Angelo Agostini Mazzinghi was born in Florence in 1385 to Augustin Mazzinghi.

He entered the Carmelite order in 1413 and after he made his solemn profession was ordained to the priesthood. He began to teach theological studies in both Florence and Frascati (in Rome) and was also a preacher in the former. Mazzinghi also was the first member of the reformed observance of Our Lady of the Wood and was made as the prior of several of the Carmelite houses. He also launched the reform of the convent of Santa Maria delle Salve and was appointed as the convent's Prior from 1419 until 1430 and then once again in 1437.

Mazzinghi preached a series of Lenten retreats in Florence from 1431 to 1434 and was to preach his final retreat in 1436 before he retired to a Carmelite convent. On one particular occasion of preaching - according to fellow Carmelite Nicholas Calciuri - witnesses witnessed roses and lilies pouring from Mazzinghi's mouth which two angels wove into a crown for the latter. Mazzinghi was known for his humble and pious demeanour as well as for his ardent devotion to both the Eucharist and to the Blessed Virgin Mary.

Before his death he retired to a Carmelite house where he spent the remainder of his life in contemplation and meditation. Mazzinghi died on 17 August 1438 in Florence at the age of 53. He was buried in Santa Maria del Carmine and was moved in 1575 though in the same church. His relics were moved in the same church to the Banacacci Chapel in 1739 and moved to the main altar in 1930 in what was the final transferral of his remains.

== Beatification ==
The diocesan process for the recognition of his following commenced in 1758 and the Congregation of Rites evaluated Mazzinghi's holiness and ended its own line of investigation on 22 December 1759.

Pope Clement XIII approved his cultus and beatified Mazzinghi on 7 March 1761.
