= Pope Clement XIII =

Head of the Catholic Church from 1758 to 1769

- Bishop of Rome
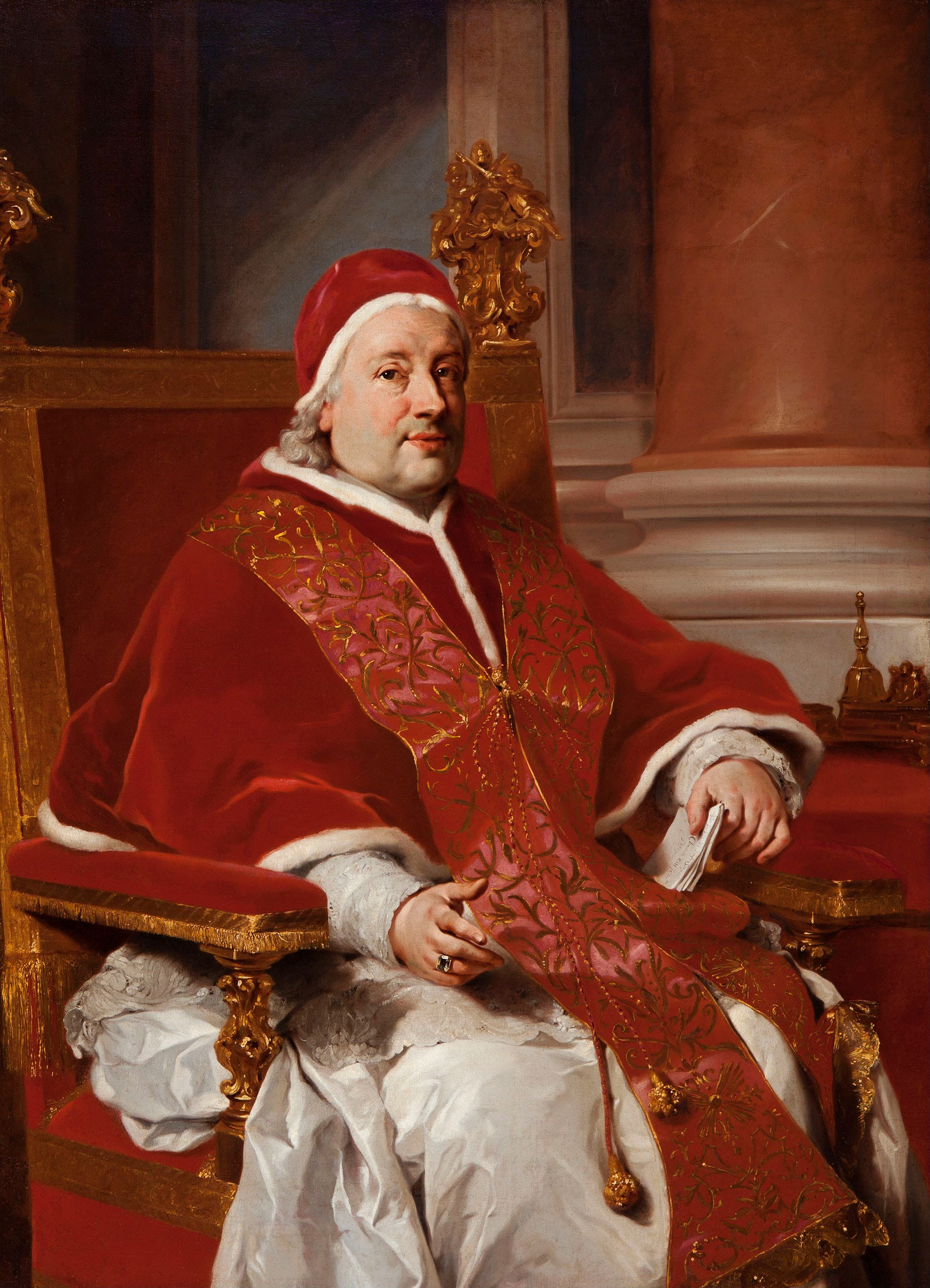
- Portrait by Anton Raphael Mengs (c. 1760, New Orleans Museum of Art)
- Church: Catholic Church
- Papacy began: 6 July 1758
- Papacy ended: 2 February 1769
- Predecessor: Benedict XIV
- Successor: Clement XIV
- Previous posts: Cardinal-Deacon of San Nicola in Carcere (1738–1747); Bishop of Padua (1743–1758); Cardinal-Priest of Santa Maria in Ara Coeli (1747–1755); Cardinal-Priest of San Marco (1755–1758)

Orders
- Ordination: 23 December 1731
- Consecration: 19 March 1743 by Pope Benedict XIV
- Created cardinal: 20 December 1737 by Clement XII

Personal details
- Born: Carlo della Torre di Rezzonico; 7 March 1693 Venice, Republic of Venice
- Died: 2 February 1769 (aged 75) Rome, Papal States
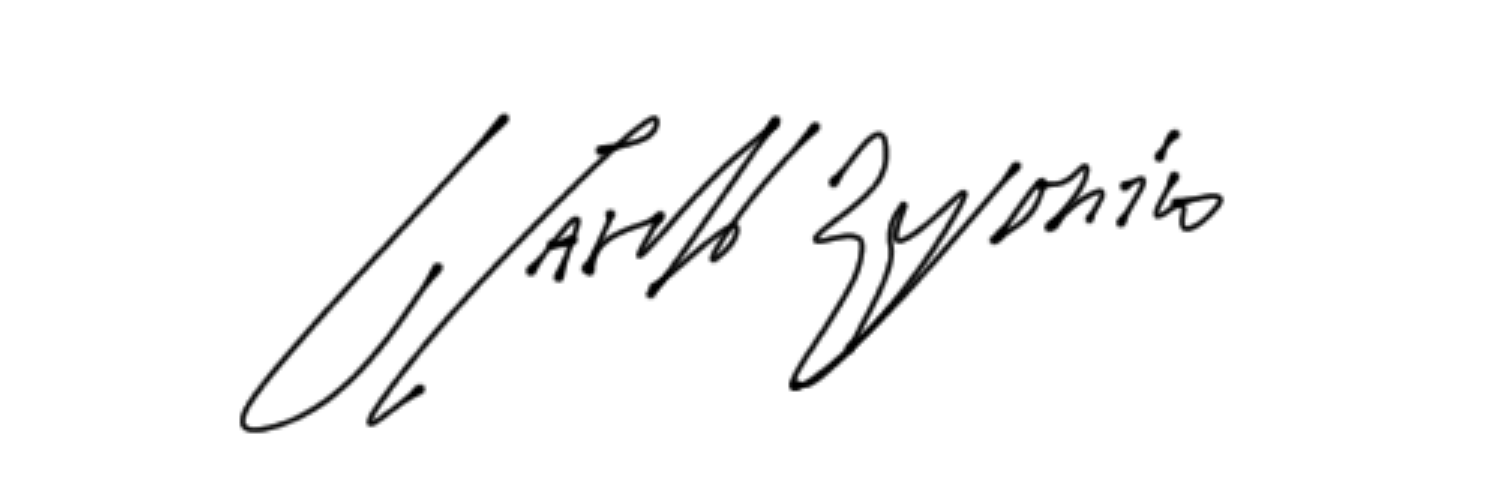
- Signature

- Coat of arms

Papal styles of Pope Clement XIII
- Reference style: His Holiness
- Spoken style: Your Holiness
- Religious style: Holy Father
- Posthumous style: None

Pope Clement XIII (Latin: Clemens XIII; Italian: Clemente XIII; 7 March 1693 – 2 February 1769), born Carlo della Torre di Rezzonico, was head of the Catholic Church and leader of the Papal States from 6 July 1758 to his death in February 1769. He was installed on 16 July 1758.

His pontificate was overshadowed by the constant pressure to suppress the Society of Jesus but despite this, he championed their order and also proved to be their greatest defender at that time. He was also one of the few early popes who favoured dialogue with Protestants and to this effect hoped to mend the schism with the Catholic Church that existed in England and the Low Countries. These efforts ultimately bore little fruit.

== Biography ==
=== Early life ===
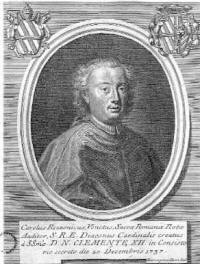
Portrait engraving of Carlo Rezzonico (c. 1737 – 44)

Carlo della Torre di Rezzonico was born on 7 March 1693 to a recently ennobled family of Venice's patriciate, the second of two children of the man who bought the unfinished palace on the Grand Canal (now Ca' Rezzonico) and finished its construction. His parents were Giovanni Battista della Torre di Rezzonico and Vittoria Barbarigo.

Carlo received a Jesuit education in Bologna and later studied at the University of Padua where he obtained his doctorate in canon law and civil law. From there, he travelled to Rome where he attended the Pontifical Academy of Ecclesiastical Nobles.

In 1716 Rezzonico became the Referendary of the Apostolic Signatura and in 1721 was appointed Governor of Fano. He was ordained to the priesthood on 23 December 1731 in Rome. Pope Clement XII appointed him to the cardinalate in 1737 as the Cardinal-Deacon of San Nicola in Carcere. He also filled various important posts in the Roman Curia.

Rezzonico was chosen as Bishop of Padua in 1743 and he received episcopal consecration in Rome by Pope Benedict XIV himself, in the presence of Giuseppe Accoramboni and Cardinal Antonio Saverio Gentili as co-consecrators. Rezzonico visited his diocese on frequent occasions and reformed the way that the diocese ran, paying attention to the social needs of the diocese. He was the first to do this in five decades. He later opted to become the Cardinal-Priest of Santa Maria in Aracoeli in 1747 and later still to become the Cardinal-Priest of San Marco in 1755.

== Pontificate ==
=== Election to the papacy ===
Pope Benedict XIV died of gout in 1758 and the College of Cardinals gathered at the papal conclave in order to elect a successor. Direct negotiations between the rival factions resulted in the proposal for the election of Rezzonico. On the evening of 6 July 1758, Rezzonico received 31 votes out of a possible 44, one more than the required amount. He selected the pontifical name of "Clement XIII" in honor of Pope Clement XII, who had elevated him to the cardinalate. Rezzonico was crowned as pontiff on 16 July 1758 by the protodeacon, Cardinal Alessandro Albani.

=== Actions ===
Notwithstanding the meekness and affability of his upright and moderate character, he was modest to a fault (he had the classical sculptures in the Vatican provided with mass-produced fig leaves) and generous with his extensive private fortune. He also permitted vernacular translations of the Bible in Catholic countries.

=== The Jesuits ===
Clement XIII's pontificate was repeatedly disturbed by disputes respecting the pressures to suppress the Jesuits coming from the progressive Enlightenment circles of the philosophes in France.

Clement XIII placed the Encyclopédie of D'Alembert and Diderot on the Index, but this index was not as effective as it had been in the previous century. More unexpected resistance came from the less progressive courts of Spain, Naples & Sicily, and Portugal. In 1758 the reforming minister of Joseph I of Portugal (1750–77), the Marquis of Pombal, expelled the Jesuits from Portugal, and transported them all to Civitavecchia, as a "gift for the Pope." That same year, Clement conferred the title of "Apostolic King" upon Holy Roman Empress Maria Theresa, extending the designation to her successors. In 1760, Pombal sent the papal nuncio home and recalled the Portuguese ambassador from the Vatican. The pamphlet titled the Brief Relation, which claimed the Jesuits had created their own sovereign independent kingdom in South America and tyrannised the Native Americans, all in the interest of an insatiable ambition and avarice, did damage to the Jesuit cause as well.

On 8 November 1760, Clement XIII issued a papal bull Quantum ornamenti, which approved the request of King Charles III of Spain to invoke the Immaculate Conception as the Patroness of Spain, along with its eastern and western territories, while continuing to recognize Saint James the Greater as co-patron.

In France, the Parlement of Paris, with its strong upper bourgeois background and Jansenist sympathies, began its campaign to expel the Jesuits from France in the spring of 1761, and the published excerpts from Jesuit writings, the Extrait des assertions, provided anti-Jesuit ammunition (though, arguably, many of the statements the Extrait contained were made to look worse than they were through judicious omission of context). Though a congregation of bishops assembled at Paris in December 1761 recommended no action, Louis XV (1715–74) promulgated a royal order permitting the Society to remain in France, with the proviso that certain essentially liberalising changes in their institution satisfy the Parlement with a French Jesuit vicar-general who would be independent of the general in Rome. When the Parlement by the arrêt of 2 August 1762 suppressed the Jesuits in France and imposed untenable conditions on any who remained in the country, Clement XIII protested against this invasion of the Church's rights and annulled the arrêts. Louis XV's ministers could not permit such an abrogation of French law, and the King finally expelled the Jesuits in November 1764.

Clement XIII warmly espoused the Jesuit order in a papal bull Apostolicum pascendi, 7 January 1765, which dismissed criticisms of the Jesuits as calumnies and praised the order's usefulness; it was largely ignored: by 1768 the Jesuits had been expelled from France, Naples & Sicily and Parma. In Spain, they appeared to be safe, but Charles III (1759–88), aware of the drawn-out contentions in Bourbon France, decided on a more peremptory efficiency. During the night of 2–3 April 1767, all the Jesuit houses of Spain were suddenly surrounded, the inhabitants arrested, shipped to the ports in the clothes they were wearing and bundled onto ships for Civitavecchia. The King's letter to Clement XIII promised that his allowance of 100 piastres each year would be withdrawn for the whole order, should any one of them venture at any time to write anything in self-defence or in criticism of the motives for the expulsion, motives that he refused to discuss, then or in the future.

Much the same fate awaited them in the territories of the Bourbon Philip, Duke of Parma, who was advised by the liberal minister Guillaume du Tillot. In 1768, Clement XIII issued a strong protest (monitorium) against the policy of the Parmese government. The question of the investiture of Parma (technically a Papal fief), aggravated the Pope's troubles. The Bourbon kings espoused their relative's quarrel, seized Avignon, Benevento and Pontecorvo, and united in a peremptory demand for the total suppression of the Jesuits (January 1769).

Driven to extremes, Clement XIII consented to call a consistory to consider the step, but on the very eve of the day set for its meeting he died, not without suspicion of poison, of which, however, there appears to be no conclusive evidence.

=== Ecumenism ===
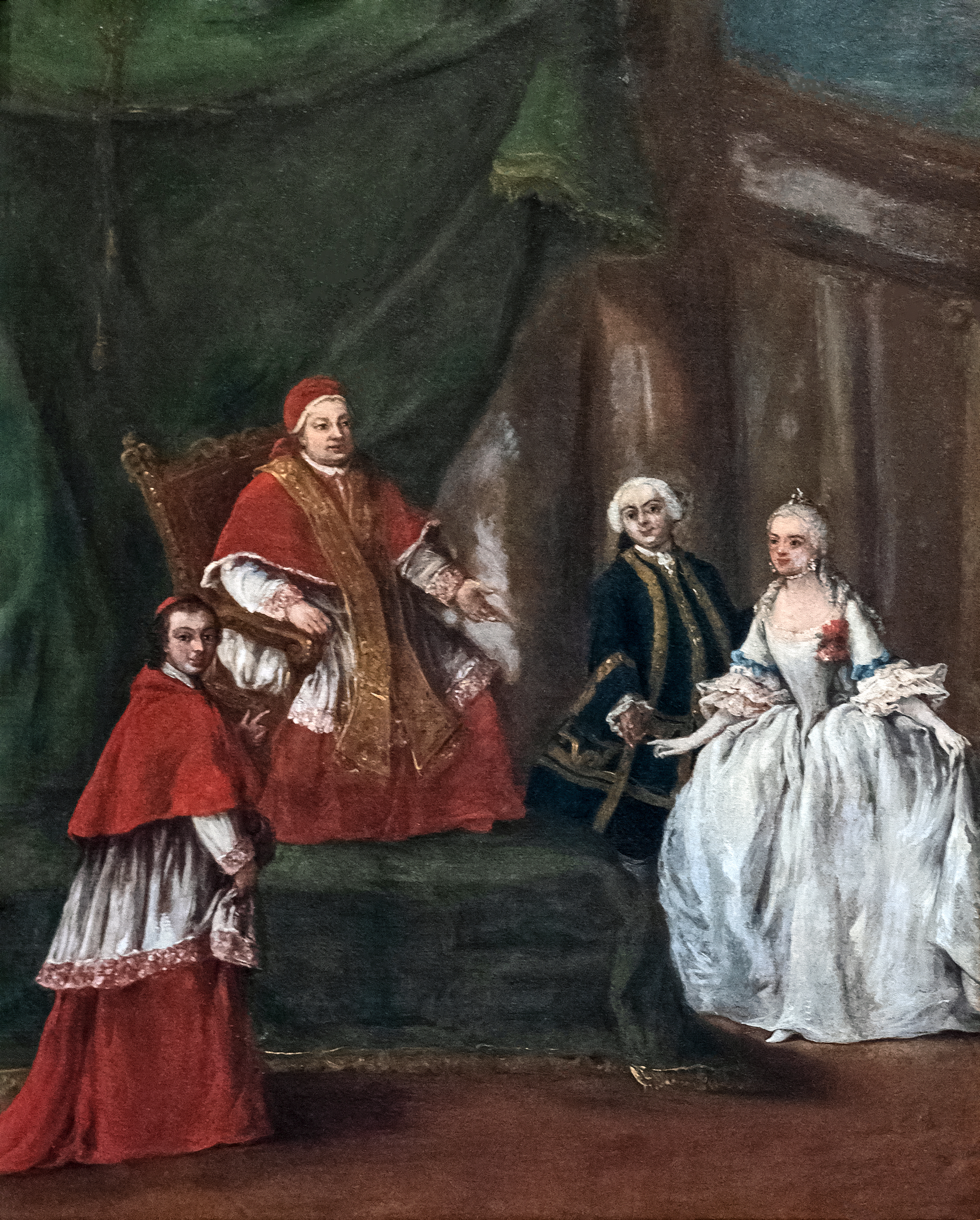
Portrait of Clement XIII with cardinal Carlo Rezzonico and other members of Rezzonico family, c. 1758

Clement XIII made attempts at engaging with Protestants. This made little progress since Clement refused to compromise on doctrine with Protestants.

In support of this policy, he recognised the Hanoverians as Kings of Great Britain despite the long-term residence in Rome of the Catholic House of Stuart. When James Francis Edward Stuart aka James III died in 1766, Clement refused to recognise his son Charles Edward Stuart as Charles III, despite the objections of his brother Cardinal Henry Benedict Stuart.

=== Other activities ===
Clement XIII created 52 new cardinals in seven consistories in his pontificate. The pope created his nephew Carlo as a cardinal in his first consistory and later created Antonio Ganganelli—who would succeed him as Pope Clement XIV—as a cardinal.

The pope approved the cultus for several individuals: Andrew of Montereale and Vincent Kadlubek on 18 February 1764, Angelus Agostini Mazzinghi on 7 March 1761, Anthony Neyrot on 22 February 1767, Agostino Novello in 1759, Elizabeth of Reute on 19 July 1766, James Bertoni in 1766, Francesco Marinoni on 5 December 1764, Mattia de Nazarei on 27 July 1765, Sebastian Maggi on 15 April 1760 and Angela Merici on 30 April 1768. He formally beatified Beatrix of Este the Elder on 19 November 1763, Bernard of Corleone on 15 May 1768, and Gregorio Barbarigo on 6 July 1761.

Clement XIII canonized four saints in his pontificate: Jerome Emiliani, Joseph Calasanz, Joseph of Cupertino, and Seraphin of Montegranaro on 16 July 1767.

=== Death ===
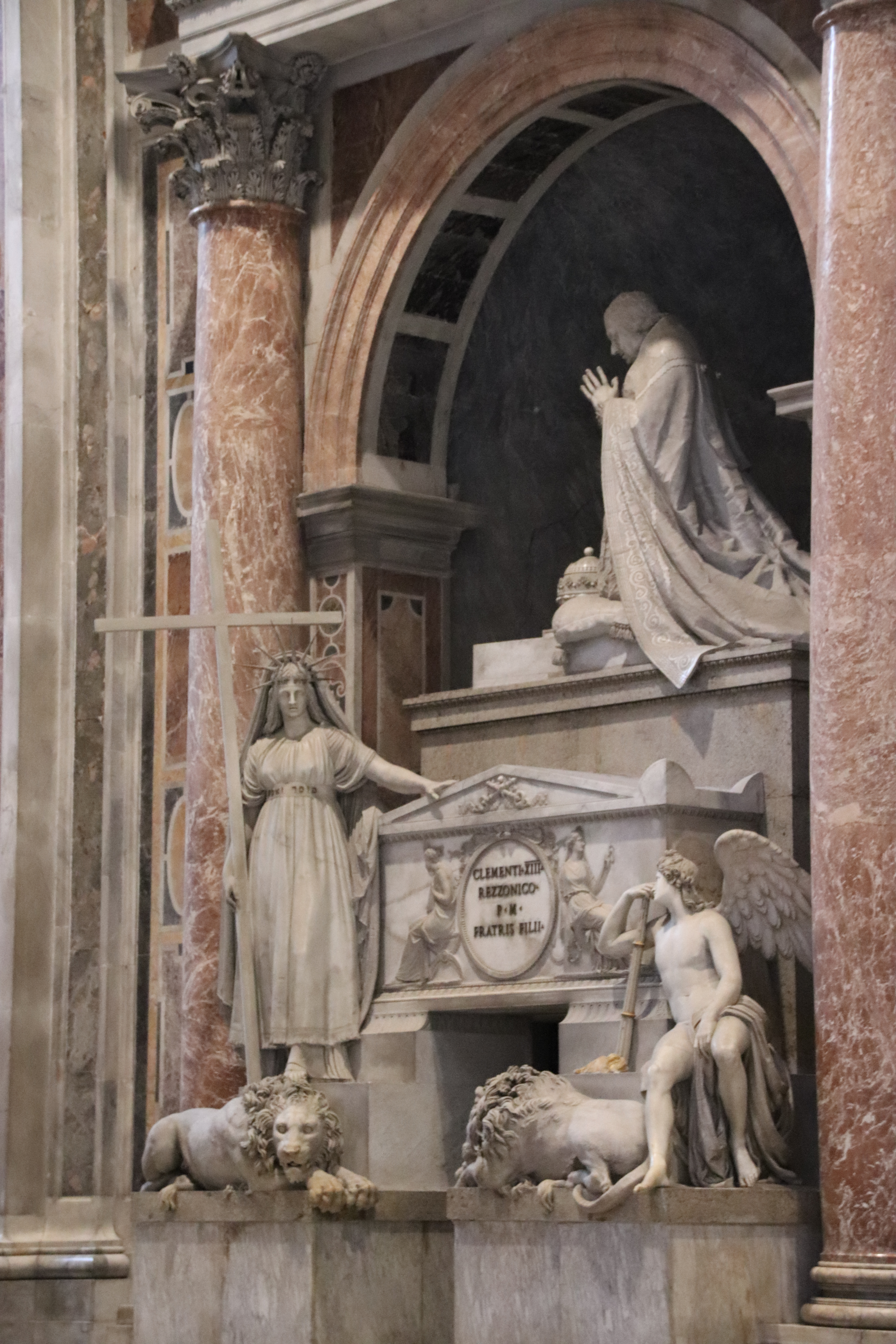
Clement XIII's tomb in St. Peter's Basilica

Clement XIII died during the night of 2 February 1769 in Rome. He had participated in the solemnities to mark the Feast of the Purification of Mary, and was noted to have participated with much fervor that would indicate good health. After lunch, he had a series of audiences, though did not leave the palace due to the exceptionally cold weather that had marred that week. He later received his nephew in an audience and then met with the Cardinal Secretary of State before he would dine with his nephew, Abondio Rezzonico, the senator of Rome. However, as the pope was getting ready for bed after reciting the evening prayers with his aide drawing off his stockings, he suddenly collapsed on his bed, exclaiming, "O God, O God, what pain!" The doctor, immediately summoned, tried blood-letting, but Clement XIII died quickly with blood gurgling in his mouth at around 5:15pm. It is generally believed that the pope experienced an aneurysm of a blood vessel near the heart.

He was laid to rest on 8 February 1769 in the Vatican but his remains were transferred on 27 September 1774 to a monument in the Vatican that had been sculpted by Antonio Canova at the request of Senator Abbondio Rezzonico, the nephew of the late pontiff.

He was described in the Annual Register for 1758 as "the honestest man in the world; a most exemplary ecclesiastic; of the purest morals; devout, steady, learned, diligent..."

== See also ==
- Cardinals created by Clement XIII
- List of encyclicals of Pope Clement XIII
- List of popes

== Sources ==
- Kelly, John Norman Davidson (1987). "Clement XIII (6 July 1758 - 2 Feb. 1769)". The Oxford Dictionary of Popes. Oxford University Press. pp. 298–299.
- Lavenia, Vincenzo (2021). "Was Niccolò Oddi a Jesuit?: Pamphlets, News, and His Disputed Deathbed Religious Profession". Journal of Jesuit Studies. 8 (4 (Sep)): 617–637. ISSN 2214-1324.
- McNamara, Celeste (2019). "Molding the Model Bishop from Trent to Vatican II". Church History. 88 (1 (MARCH)): 58–86.
- Schuchard, Marsha Keith (2012). Emanuel Swedenborg, Secret Agent on Earth and in Heaven: Jacobites, Jews, and Freemasons in Early Modern Sweden. Brill. ISBN 9789004183124.
- Shore, Paul J. (2012). Narratives of Adversity: Jesuits in the eastern peripheries of the Habsburg realms (1640-1773). Central European University Press.

Catholic Church titles
Preceded by Giovanni Minotto Ottoboni	Bishop of Padova; 11 March 1743 – 6 July 1758	Succeeded by Sante Veronese
Preceded by Benedict XIV	Pope; 6 July 1758 – 2 February 1769	Succeeded by Clement XIV
