= Andrew of Montereale =

Italian priest and saint (c. 1403–1479)

Blessed Andrew of Montereale O.S.A.

Priest
- Born: c. 1403; Mascioni, Campotosto, Papal States
- Died: 18 April 1479 (aged 76); Montereale, Papal States
- Venerated in: Roman Catholic Church
- Beatified: 18 February 1764, Saint Peter's Basilica, Papal States by Pope Clement XIII
- Feast: 18 April
- Attributes: Augustinian habit; Bible; Stole
- Patronage: Montereale

Andrew of Montereale (c. 1403 – 18 April 1479) was an Italian Roman Catholic priest and a professed member of the Order of Saint Augustine. His life was devoted to teaching and leading the Augustinians from several positions of leadership; he was also hailed during his lifetime as a pious miracle worker.

His following increased after his death which allowed for Pope Clement XIII to preside over his beatification in 1764.

== Life ==
Andrew of Montereale was born around 1403 in Mascioni, on the shores of what is now Lake Campotosto into a modest household. It is believed that as a child he worked on farmland as a shepherd.

In his adolescence he met the prior of an Augustinian convent in Montereale – Augustine of Terni – and entered their ranks not long after at the age of 14, in 1417, on his path to both profession and to the priesthood. Andrew was ordained as a priest in 1428 at age 25 and went on to earn both a bachelor and master's degree in theological studies; he was able to become a teacher after receiving these degrees. Andrew studied also in Rimini (1431) and Padua as well as in Siena and Ferrara.

Andrew held various positions of leadership amongst the Augustinians and was soon made Prior Provincial in 1453 and later Prior in succession. In 1461 the Prior General directed him to leave the monastery of Norcia, but not long after was made the latter's personal representative for an official visitation at the Augustinian collective in Amatrice. In 1471, he was once again made Prior Provincial. Andrew also served as a travelling preacher in the Italian cities as well as in France; he also reformed several of the Augustinian monasteries in Umbria.

He died on 18 April 1479 at the age of 76 in Montereale and is buried there.

== Beatification ==
Devotion to him strengthened after his death and his following grew to the point where his cause for sainthood was requested in Montereale. Pope Clement XIII recognized the virtues and manner in which the late priest led his life and celebrated his beatification on 18 February 1764.
