= St. Cabrini Home =

Orphanage in New York, U.S.

Original grounds of Sacred Heart Orphan Asylum, circa 1890

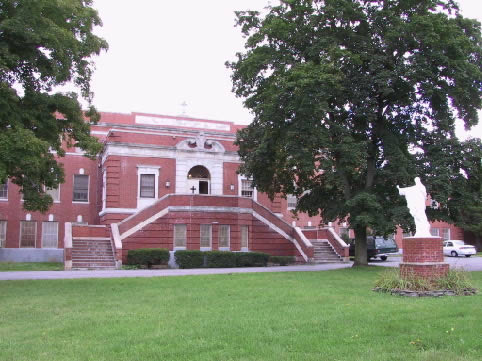
Mother Cabrini School, built 1934 and demolished 2017

Saint Cabrini Home (formerly the Sacred Heart Orphan Asylum or the Sacred Heart Orphanage) was an American nonprofit organization in West Park, Ulster County, New York, serving youth with emotional or family difficulties. The home was established by Saint Frances Xavier Cabrini in 1890, and was closed in 2011.

== Founding ==
Mother Cabrini, founder of the Missionary Sisters of the Sacred Heart of Jesus, traveled from Italy to New York City in 1889 with six of her Sisters, after Pope Leo XIII asked them to serve the burgeoning population of Italian emigrants to the United States. Within weeks of arriving in New York, the Sisters were caring for a small group of orphaned or unsupervised young girls in a donated Fifth Avenue apartment.

Realizing that they needed a larger property, with land, to provide for the children, Cabrini purchased a property in rural West Park from the Society of Jesus (Jesuits) to serve as an orphanage for Italian immigrant girls. Because the Missionary Sisters of the Sacred Heart is a begging order, all properties purchased by the Sisters are and were funded through gifts and loans, and not the Catholic Church. The West Park property included a monastery and working farm. Having run their well dry, and believing there to be no water on the grounds, the Jesuits sold the property at a fraction of its worth. Cabrini envisioned digging for a spring that would provide enough water for the fledgling orphanage. Surprisingly, the spring, found just up the hill to the west of the main road, provides water to the campus to this day.

Within weeks of opening the orphanage, the Sisters began accepting children with a variety of backgrounds from Poughkeepsie, Newburgh, Kingston, and other local communities. Archives from this period were maintained in a museum room on the campus.

St. Cabrini Home served as the novitiate and United States home base for Mother Cabrini and her Sisters for decades. Upon her death in Chicago on December 22, 1917, Cabrini was buried at her beloved West Park campus, as per her wishes. Her body was exhumed and divided in 1933 as part of her canonization process. The major portion was transferred to the chapel of Mother Cabrini High School in New York City, and now rests in the St. Frances Xavier Cabrini Shrine adjoining the school.

== Expansion and community support ==
Mother Cabrini's canonization in 1946 brought new attention to the orphanage, attracting visitors from around the world. In 1959, the agency officially incorporated as St. Cabrini Home, Inc., which brought changes in governance. In 1968, the agency began accepting the infant brothers of girls already in care at the home. The campus program remained co-ed until 2004. St. Cabrini Home also expanded its programs to provide community-based living in group homes locally.

Throughout these changes, and as Cabrini's worldwide network of institutions grew, her Sisters relied on the support of the communities surrounding the orphanage. This support included donations of food, supplies, and money; local families volunteering to host orphaned children for the holidays; and recreational outings sponsored by local businesspeople. Eventually, much of the agency's work was performed by dedicated laypeople, and community support remains critical to the Sisters' legacy.

== Later difficulties and closure ==
In 2004, the center reverted to an all-female facility, licensed by the New York State Office of Alcoholism and Substance Abuse Services.

On August 5, 2009, a young woman committed suicide by jumping in front of a truck on Route 9W. The Benedictine Hospital, the Daily Freeman newspaper, and several witnesses all documented that the young woman was extremely depressed and expressed an urge to kill herself prior to the incident because the hospital had released her back to the Cabrini home, despite her wishes not to return.

On April 13, 2010, cottage supervisor Howard Wilson was arrested and charged with raping a 16-year-old female resident of the facility. In 2011, Wilson pleaded guilty to felony rape.

On September 4, 2010, a rock- and debris-throwing incident led to a state trooper's patrol car being hit with a cinderblock chunk. In addition to the alleged perpetrators, two Cabrini staffers were also arrested on charges of acting in a manner injurious to a minor for, as police put it, "doing little or nothing to stop the girls during the roughly two hours that they threw rocks and other debris at cars zipping along the highway."

After the suicide, rape, and stone-throwing, the Cabrini facility for young women was closed in 2011. The brick school built on the estate in 1934 was demolished in 2017.
