= St. Frances Xavier Cabrini Church =

St. Frances Xavier Cabrini Church may refer to:

- Saint Frances Cabrini Parish, San Jose, California
- St. Frances Cabrini Church (New Orleans)
- St. Frances X. Cabrini Church (Scituate, Massachusetts)
- St. Frances Cabrini Catholic Church (Omaha, Nebraska)
- St. Frances Xavier Cabrini Shrine, New York City
