= Cabrini High School =

Cabrini High School may refer to:

- Cabrini High School (New Orleans), Louisiana
- Cabrini High School (Michigan), in Allen Park
- Mother Cabrini High School, New York City

== See also ==
- Cabrini (disambiguation)
