= Villa Cabrini Academy =

Defunct Catholic school in California, United States

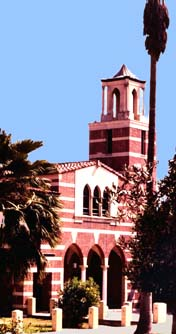
- The former chapel of Villa Cabrini Academy, now the Los Angeles Times Library of Woodbury University

Location
- Burbank, California; United States; 34°12′27″N 118°20′28″W

Information
- Type: Private
- Religious affiliation: Catholic
- Established: 1937
- Closed: 1970
- Gender: Girls

Villa Cabrini Academy was a private Catholic elementary and high school for girls that operated from 1937 to 1970, under the authority of the Archdiocese of Los Angeles.

== History ==
The academy was located in Burbank, California, and served the Catholic population of the San Fernando Valley. It was sponsored by the Missionary Sisters of the Sacred Heart of Jesus, founded by Frances Xavier Cabrini, the first citizen of the United States to be declared a saint by the Catholic Church.

The school closed in June 1970. Its campus was used as the first location of the new California Institute of the Arts from July 1970 to when the new main campus for CalArts in Valencia, California was completed in November 1971. It was rented for some time, then acquired by Los Angeles Lutheran High School in 1977 and subsequently sold in the mid-1980s to Woodbury University, which moved its operations from its original urban site in Los Angeles to the grounds of the former high school in 1987.

The academy chapel was converted into the university library, and the chapel's statues and stained-glass windows were re-installed at the Mother Cabrini Shrine on Colorado's Lookout Mountain.

== Notable alumni ==
- Joan Freeman, actress(attended)
