= Cabrini Shrine =

Cabrini Shrine may refer to:

- Mother Cabrini Shrine in Golden, Colorado
- St. Frances Xavier Cabrini Shrine in Manhattan, New York City
