= Cabrini (surname) =

Cabrini is an Italian surname. Notable people with the surname include:

- Antonio Cabrini (born 1957), Italian footballer and coach
- Frances Xavier Cabrini (1850–1917), Italian-American nun
- Roberto Cabrini (born 1960), Brazilian journalist

== See also ==
- Cabrini
