= Statue of Frances Xavier Cabrini =

Statue in Manhattan, New York, U.S.

Statue of Frances Xavier Cabrin
- Year: 2021
- Medium: Bronze
- Subject: Frances Xavier Cabrin
- Location: New York City, New York, U.S.; 40°42′23.7″N 74°1′8.9″W

The Statue of Frances Xavier Cabrini is a statue located in Battery Park City, Manhattan.

== Details ==
The statue is a bronze sculpture depicting Frances Xavier Cabrini on a paper boat along with a girl and a boy set against a backdrop of Ellis Island and the Statue of Liberty. According to the artist, the two children are sailing into the New World with the boy and the girl holding his luggage and the boat symbolising the readiness to face the future and her steadfastness, respectively. Through the Cabrini Museum's help in Italy, the bottom of the sculpture has a mosaic via using riverbed stones from Cabrini's birthplace.

== History ==
The statue opened on 12 October 2020.
