= Cabrini =

Cabrini may refer to:

- Cabrini (surname), an Italian surname
- Cabrini Boulevard, Manhattan
- Cabrini Medical Center, Manhattan
- Cabrini University, Philadelphia
- Cabrini–Green Homes, a closed housing project in Chicago
- Cabrini (film), a 2024 film about the life of Frances Xavier Cabrini

== See also ==
- Cabrini High School (disambiguation)
