= Frances Xavier Cabrini =

Italian-American religious sister (1850–1917)

Saint Frances Xavier Cabrini M.S.C.
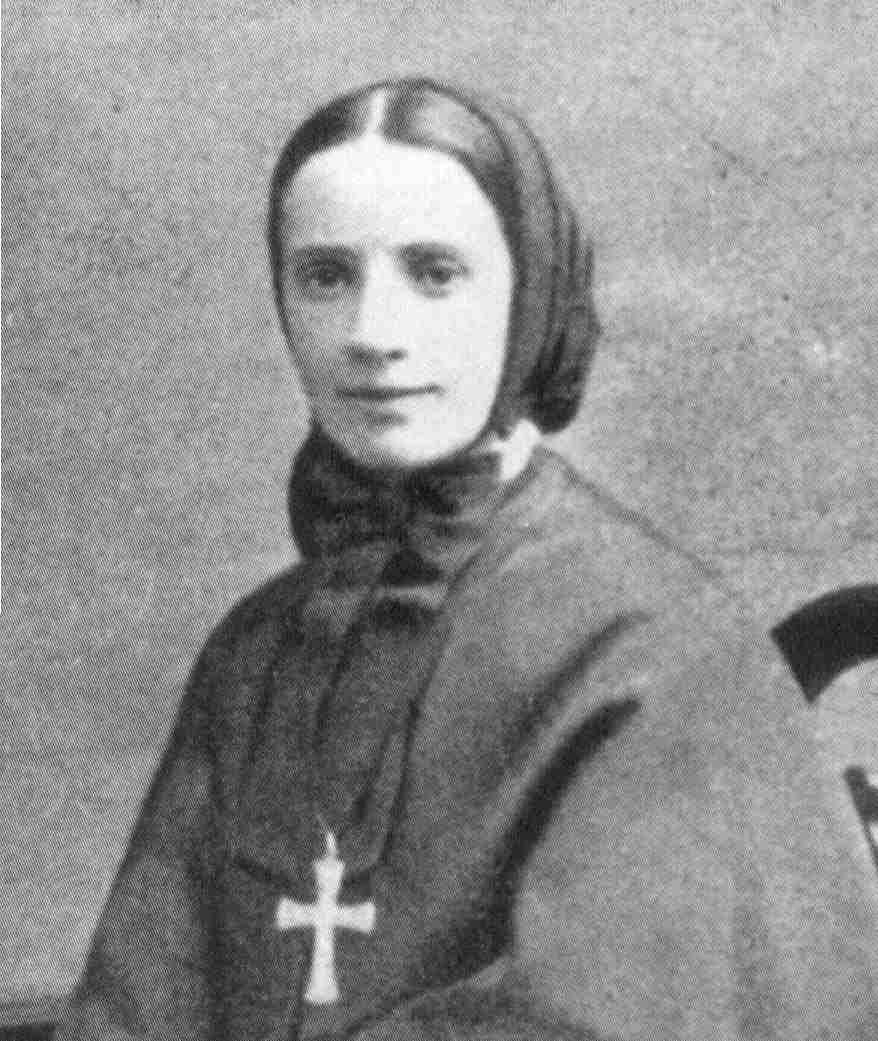

Virgin
- Born: Maria Francesca Cabrini; 15 July 1850; Sant'Angelo Lodigiano, Kingdom of Lombardy–Venetia, Austrian Empire
- Died: 22 December 1917 (aged 67); Chicago, Illinois, United States
- Resting place: St. Frances Xavier Cabrini Shrine, Upper Manhattan, New York
- Venerated in: Catholic Church
- Beatified: 13 November 1938 by Pope Pius XI
- Canonized: 7 July 1946 by Pope Pius XII
- Major shrine: National Shrine of Saint Frances Xavier Cabrini, Chicago; Mother Cabrini Shrine, Golden, Colorado; St. Frances Xavier Cabrini Shrine, New York City
- Feast: 13 November (US, 1961 to date); 22 December (elsewhere)
- Patronage: Immigrants

Superior General of the Missionary Sisters of the Sacred Heart of Jesus
- In office 1880–1917
- Succeeded by: Antonietta Della Casa

Frances Xavier Cabrini MSC (born Maria Francesca Cabrini; 15 July 1850 – 22 December 1917), also known as Mother Cabrini, was a prominent Italian-American religious sister in the Catholic Church. Cabrini founded the Missionary Sisters of the Sacred Heart of Jesus (MSC), a religious institute that today provides education, health care, and other services to the poor in 15 nations. She was the first American Catholic to be canonized.

Born in Italy, Cabrini migrated to the United States in 1887. Despite anti-Italian prejudice and opposition within the Catholic Church in America, she successfully established charitable institutions in New York City for poor Italian immigrants. She later extended these efforts to Italian immigrant populations across the United States.

Catholic leaders were soon calling on her to create missions in Latin America and Europe. During her lifetime, Cabrini established 67 schools, orphanages and other social service institutions in Italy, the United States and other nations. She became a revered and influential figure in the Catholic hierarchy in the United States and Rome. Cabrini became a naturalized American citizen in 1909. After her death in 1917, her order started a campaign for her sainthood. She was beatified in 1938 and canonized in 1946. The Vatican named her the patron saint of immigrants in 1950. (Note: Elizabeth Ann Seton was the first canonized saint born in what is now the United States. She was born in 1774 in New York, then a British colony, and canonized in 1975.)

== Life in Italy ==
=== Early years ===
Maria Francesca Cabrini was born on 15 July 1850, in Sant'Angelo Lodigiano, in the Kingdom of Lombardy–Venetia, then part of the Austrian Empire. She was the youngest of the 13 children of farmer Agostino Cabrini and his wife Stella Oldini. Only four of her siblings survived beyond adolescence.

Born two months prematurely, Frances Cabrini was small and weak as a child and remained in delicate health throughout her life. During her childhood, she visited an uncle, Don Luigi Oldini of Livraga, Lombardy, a priest who lived beside a canal. While in Livraga, she made little paper boats, dropped violets she called "missionaries" in the boats, and launched them in the stream to sail to India and China. Cabrini made her first holy communion at age nine. On one occasion, she fell into the river and was swept downstream. Her rescuers found her on a riverbank. Cabrini attributed her rescue to divine intervention.

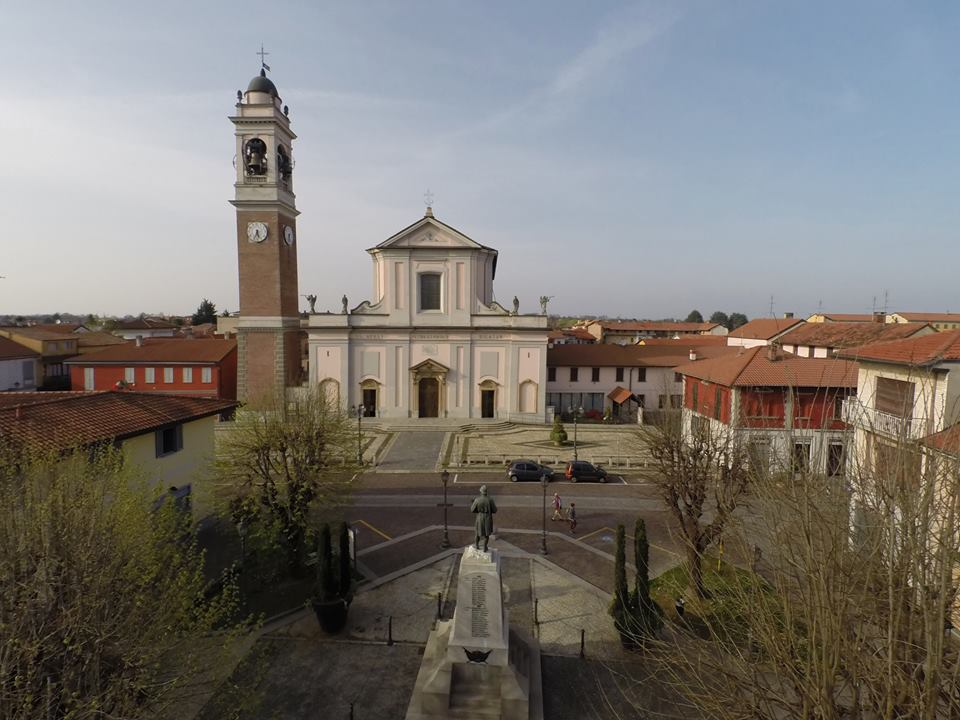
Arluno, Italy, where Cabrini attended school (2014)

Cabrini's older sister Rosa was a teacher, which influenced her to follow the same career path. At age 13, Cabrini attended a school in Arluno, Lombardy, that was run by the Daughters of the Sacred Heart of Jesus. In 1868, she graduated cum laude from the school with a teaching certificate and returned to Sant'Angelo Lodigiano to teach at the parish school. She later worked for three more years as a substitute teacher at a school in Castiraga Vidardo in Lombardy.

After Cabrini's parents died in 1870, she applied for admission to the Daughters of the Sacred Heart at Arluno. However, the sisters rejected Cabrini because they believed her health wasn't strong enough. In 1872, while working with the sick during a smallpox outbreak, she contracted the disease and was rejected by the Canossian Sisters of Crema, again for health reasons. It was reported, however, that the priest in Cabrini's parish asked the two orders to deny her application because he did not want to lose her as a teacher.

=== Orphanage in Italy ===
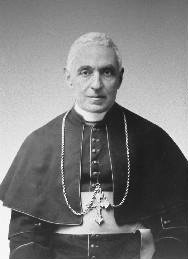
Bishop Scalabrini

In 1874, a priest in Codogno, Lombardy, invited Cabrini to take over a poorly-run orphanage operated by the Sisters of Providence in that town. After arriving in Codogno, Cabrini took religious vows into Sisters of Providence, finally achieving her goal of becoming a religious sister. She added Xavier (Saverio in Italian) to her name to honor Francis Xavier, the patron saint of missionary service. Like Xavier, her ultimate ambition was to become a missionary in East Asia. However, the two Providence sisters in charge of the orphanage finances were jealous of Cabrini and worked to thwart her actions.

In 1880, due to their turmoil, the Providence Sisters in Codogno dissolved and the orphanage closed. Cabrini then spoke with the bishop of the Diocese of Lodi, Domenico Gelmini, about her future. He told Cabrini that she should pursue her dream of becoming a missionary, but that he did not know of any religious orders that would train her. Cabrini responded by saying that she would start her own missionary order.

Cabrini bought a former Franciscan convent in Codogno. With several of the former Providence sisters, Cabrini in November 1880 founded the Institute of the Salesian Missionaries of the Sacred Heart (MSC). At the Codogno convent, the MSC sisters took in orphans and foundlings, opened a day school, started classes in needlework, and sold their fine embroidery. Over the next five years, the MSC sisters established seven homes, a free school and a nursery in Lombardy.

In early 1887, with the blessing of Bishop Giovanni Scalabrini of Piacenza, Cabrini opened a convent in Castel San Giovanni in the Emilia-Romagna region. Scalabrini had recently founded the Scalabrinian Missionaries, an order of priests to perform missionary work with Italian immigrants in New York City. He believed that the MSC sisters would be of tremendous assistance to the priests in their work. He asked Cabrini to consider opening an orphanage in New York. Countess Mary Reid DiCesnola, a wealthy Catholic socialite in Manhattan, had been relentlessly petitioning both the pope and Archbishop Michael Corrigan of New York to open an orphanage there for Italian girls, which she would fund. Cabrini still wanted to go to Asia, but also wanted to open a religious home in Rome and gain papal approval for MSC. She allowed Scalabrini set up a meeting with Pope Leo XIII.

== Papal recognition ==
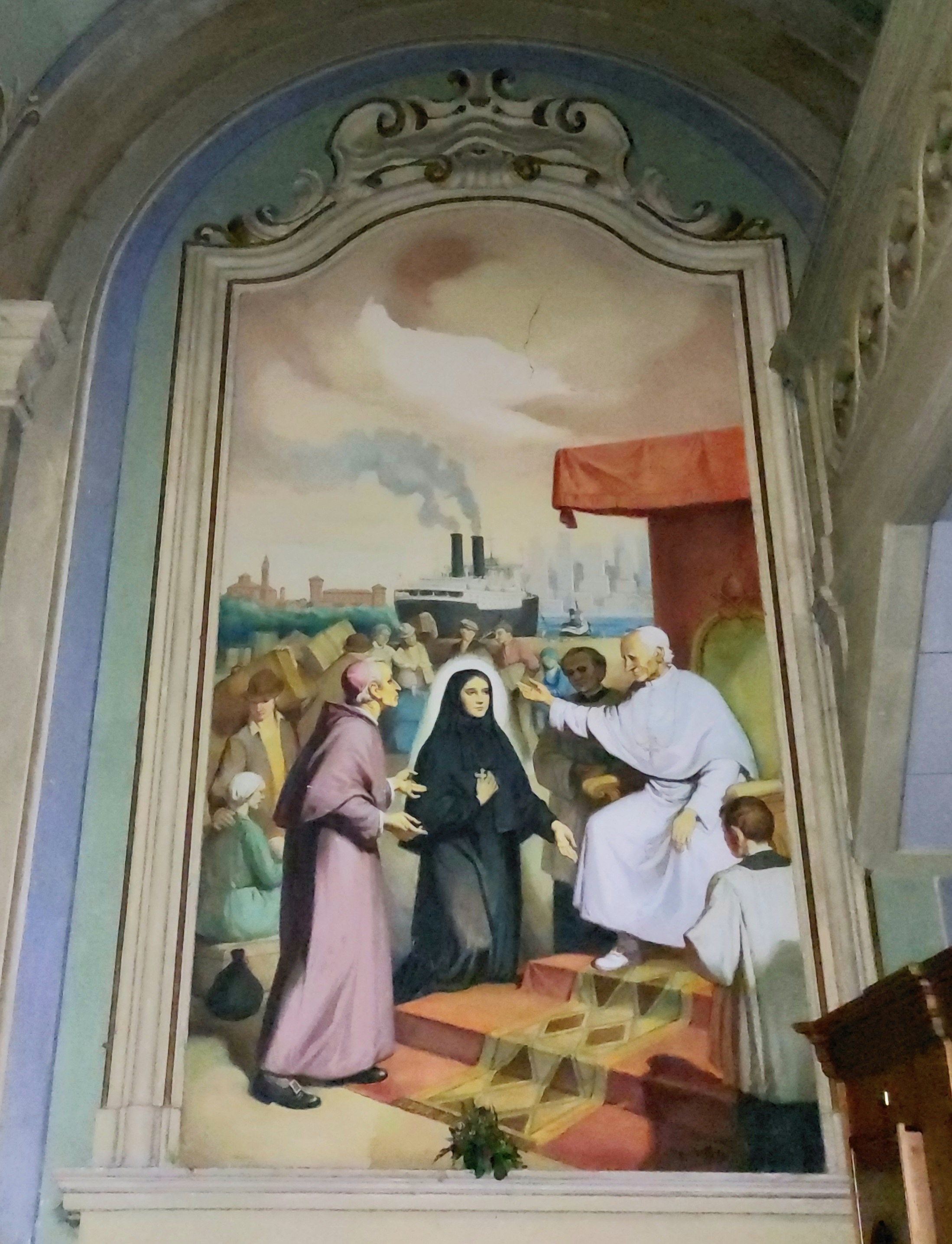
Mother Cabrini meets Pope Leo XIII (1887). Fresco by Luigi Arzuffi, at the Our Lady of the Assumption Church, Caselle Landi, Glogowski

In September 1887, Cabrini went to Rome to meet Leo XIII. She asked him for permission to set up a convent in Rome, which he readily gave. She also asked for permission to send missions to Asia. However, Leo XIII was thinking of a different destination.

During the 1880s, the pope and the rest of the Roman Curia were worried about the large numbers of impoverished Italian immigrants emigrating to New York. Leo was concerned that these Catholics would leave the church unless they received material assistance and spiritual guidance. Instead of allowing Cabrini to go to China, Leo XIII told her, go "...not to the East, but to the West..." to New York City.

In December 1888, Cabrini committed to going to New York City. The pope also recognized the MSC as a missionary institute, the first group of Italian religious sisters to receive that approval. Scalabrini promised Cabrini that his religious order, the Scalabrinians would greet the MSC sisters in New York City, take care of their needs, and work closely with them.

== Mission in New York ==
=== Arrival ===
Corrigan wrote to Cabrini in February 1889, welcoming her to New York City, but advising her to delay her departure to allow more time for preparation. However, when the letter reached Italy, Cabrini was already gone. At age 38, Cabrini sailed for the United States, arriving in New York City on March 31, 1889, with six other MSC sisters. When they disembarked from the ship, the Scalabrinians were not there. Furthermore, they had failed to arrange accommodations for them. The sisters spent their first night in the United States in a decrepit rooming house with bed bugs in the mattresses, forcing them to sleep on chairs.

During this period, the Catholic hierarchy and clergy in New York City were dominated by Irish immigrants who shared a common prejudice against Italians. Many of the Irish Catholics considered the Italians to be dirty, superstitious and almost pagan. The Irish-run parishes frequently segregated Italian worshippers in church basements. The archdiocese had very few Italian priests, hindering communication with the Italians. Corrigan, also Irish, believed that only men were suitable for missionary work with immigrants. He had wanted the Vatican to just send him Italian priests, not religious sisters.

=== Meeting with archbishop ===
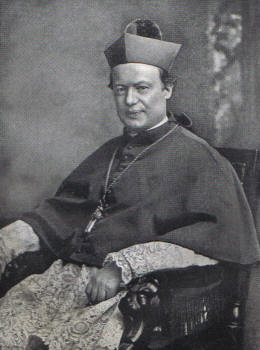
Archbishop Corrigan (before 1902)

The day after arriving in New York, Cabrini and the other sisters walked into Corrigan's office. Totally surprised that they were in New York, Corrigan told Cabrini that the archdiocese was unready for them and that they should immediately return to Italy. Cabrini refused to go back, simply saying, “I have letters from the pope”, and gave her letters of introduction to Corrigan. Unwilling to defy a papal mandate, Corrigan could not force the MSC sisters to leave.

Corrigan asked Cabrini to establish a school for Italians first and wait on the orphanage. After the meeting with Corrigan, the Sisters of Charity in the Bronx gladly provided temporary residence for Cabrini and her entourage at their convent. After much delay, the Scalabrinian priests provided a rundown convent for the MSC sisters in the Five Points area of Manhattan.

=== Mission work ===
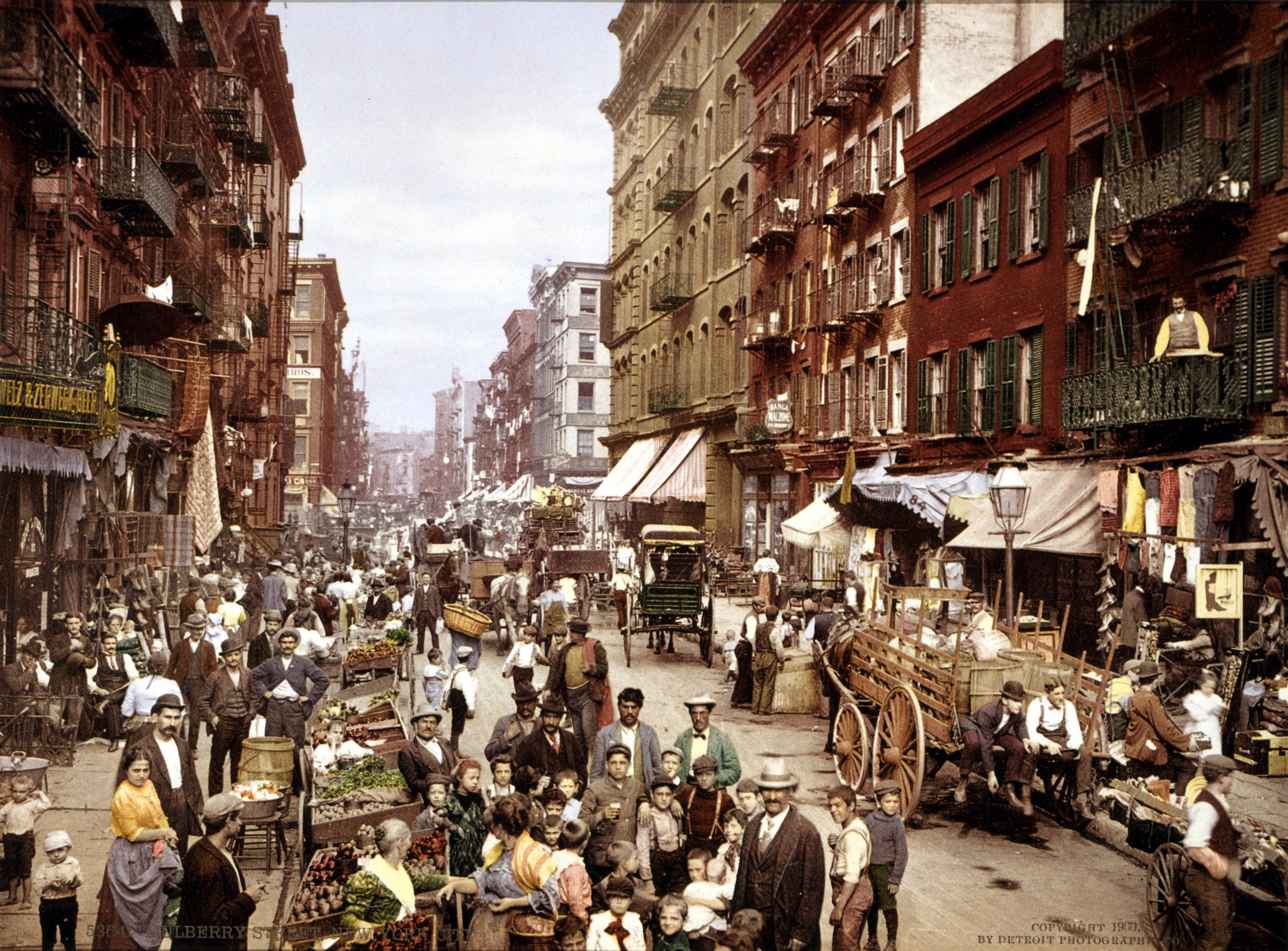
Little Italy, New York City (1900)

Soon after their arrival in the city, the MSC sisters started experiencing degrading, anti-Italian slurs and insults. Cabrini wrote back to the sisters in Italy, asking that they send over fabrics for the making of additional veils and habits. She wanted her sisters to be cleanly dressed, “otherwise they will call us ‘guinea-pigs’ the way they do to the Italians here.”

Cabrini and the MSC sisters started knocking on tenement doors in Little Italy in Manhattan. At that time, many Italian immigrants in New York were suspicious of the institutional Catholic Church, sentiments fostered by the government of the newly unified Italy. Their loyalties lay more with their personal saints. In addition, as most of the immigrants came from Sicily, Calabria and other southern regions, they were initially suspicious of the MSC sisters, who all originated from Lombardy in Northern Italy.

With the help of sisters from the other religious orders in New York, the MSC sisters started tending the sick, teaching children and feeding the hungry. They set up a makeshift school for 200 children in the balcony of a local Catholic church. Soon the merchants in Little Italy started providing the sisters with food and funding to support their mission.

With Corrigan's blessing and funding from DiCesnola, Cabrini opened the Sacred Heart Orphan Asylum on the Lower East Side of Manhattan. This was her first orphanage in the United States. However, the high cost of running the orphanage in the city, plus increasing friction with Corrigan, soon prompted Cabrini to move it to the countryside.

=== First orphanage in United States ===
St. Cabrini Home, West Park, New York (1890)

In 1890, Cabrini purchased a property from the Jesuits in West Park, New York, where she relocated the orphanage. She also established an MSC novitiate on the property. The West Park campus became St. Cabrini Home, the MSC headquarters in the United States and a boarding school. At that time, other orphanages would automatically force girls to leave once they turned age 14. Cabrini refused to do that. She insisted that the orphanages only discharge the girls if they were placed with an adoptive family or trained to earn an independent living.

Cabrini once wrote:

“What we as women cannot do on a large scale to help solve grave social ills is being done in our small sphere of influence in every state and city where we have opened houses. In them we shelter and care for orphans, the sick and the poor.”

Although she moved the MSC order to West Park, Cabrini continued to work in New York City. The Scalabrinians thwarted her efforts to build a school there. However, she joined with them in 1890 to build the first hospital in the city for Italians. She brought ten MSC sisters from Italy to staff the hospital, which opened in 1891.

== Other missions ==
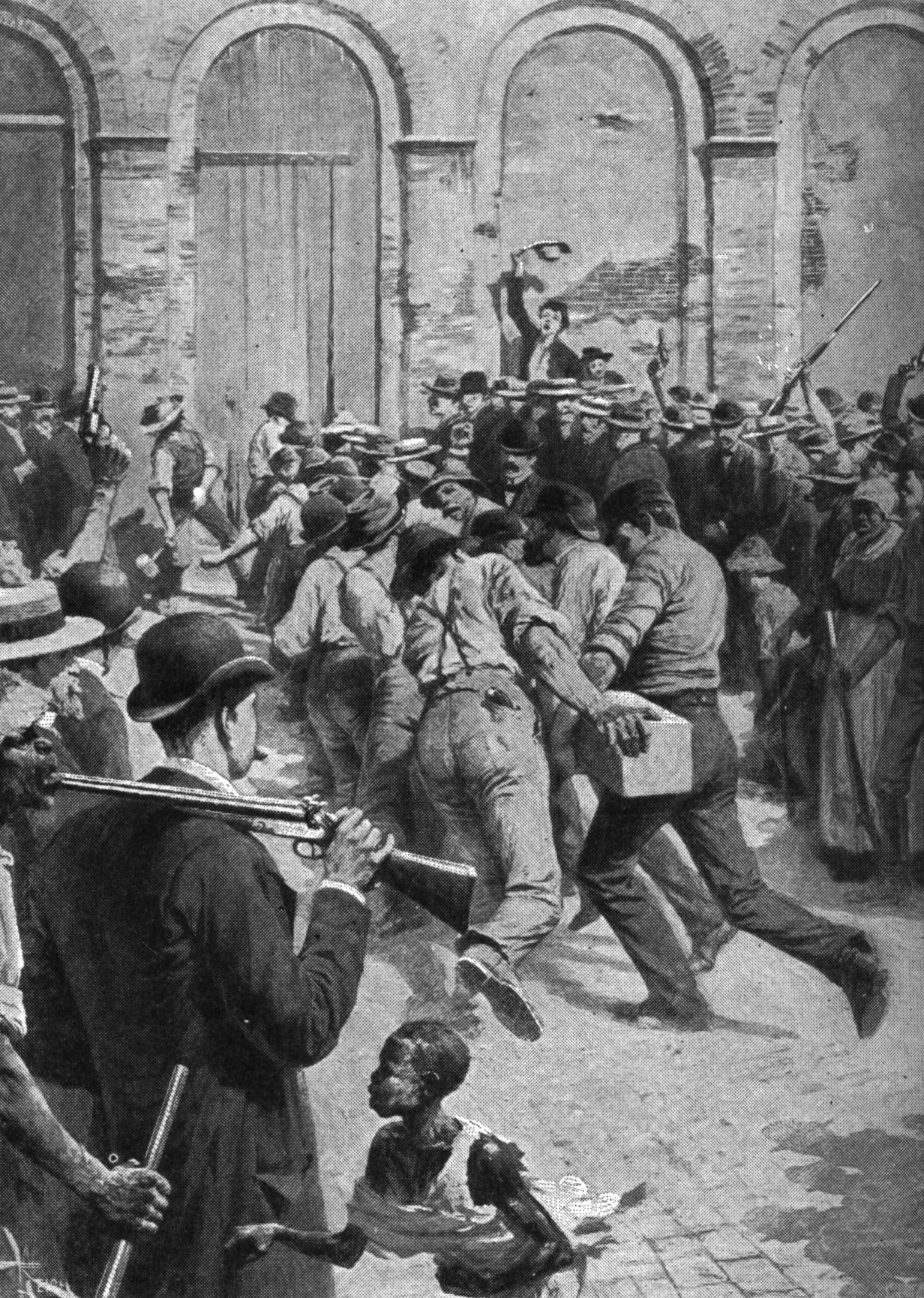
Lynching of 11 Italian immigrants In New Orleans, Louisiana (1891)

As Cabrini's reputation grew, she started receiving requests for help on Catholic projects outside New York for both Italian and non-Italian Catholics. She sailed in 1891 to Nicaragua to open a religious house. While there, she traveled by boat into a remote area to visit a settlement of Miskito people. Arriving in Chile, she traveled by mule over the Andes Mountains to found schools in Brazil and Argentina. She also went to the island of Grenada to start a school.

The final destination in Cabrini's first mission trip was New Orleans, Louisiana, in 1892, where she set up another school for Italians. The area was a hotbed of anti-Catholic sentiment, combined with racial discrimination against immigrants from Southern Italy, who locals believed did not "look White." In 1891, a large mob forcibly removed 11 Italian men in jail and killed them. The MSC sisters established a mission in the poorest Italian neighborhood in the city.

Cabrini was forced to return early to New York from New Orleans in later 1892 because the new hospital there was facing closure. The Scalabrinians had mismanaged the hospital and were trying to transfer its debts to MSC. After pulling the sisters from that hospital, she spent $250 to found the Columbus Hospital in Manhattan. Tired of the conflicts with the Scalabrinian leadership, she cut all ties between them and MSC in 1892.

During the early 1890s, Cabrini established schools for Italian communities in Manhattan, the Bronx, Newark, New Jersey, and Scranton, Pennsylvania. Cabrini returned to Louisiana in 1895 and established missions in Metairie, Harvey Canal and Kenner. The MSC sisters traveled by mule through rural towns and villages to minister to Catholics. They would visit local hospitals and act as interpreters for Italian patients who could not speak English.

While in Buenos Aires, Argentina, in 1896, Cabrini made these comments about how she coped with all of her work.

“Prayer and interior silence are great necessities for the person who is occupied with a thousand concerns: speaking, listening, hearing, giving of herself even to many good things...Prayer and silence bring her to that mystical rest."

=== Later years ===
Cabrini arrived in Chicago, Illinois, in 1899 to work with the large Italian population in that city. Her next stop in 1902 was in Denver, Colorado, followed by a trip to Seattle, Washington, in 1903.

In 1907, Cabrini stopped in Philadelphia, Pennsylvania, to dine with Mother Katherine Drexel, who had established numerous Catholic missions and schools through the United States for African-Americans and Native Americans. Cabrini had wanted to personally thank Drexel for her helping an MSC sister in Philadelphia. In a very amiable conversation, Drexel told Cabrini that the Vatican bureaucracy was stymieing her religious order on a legal matter. Believing in direct action, Cabrini told her to personally go to Rome and stay there until the Vatican resolved the problem. Drexel took her advice and succeeded in her mission.

Cabrini was naturalized as a United States citizen in 1909. She applied for citizenship to assure the legal foundation of the MSC order after her death and to demonstrate solidarity with the Americans that she served.

Cabrini in 1911 opened a second Columbus Hospital in the Italian neighborhood in Lincoln Park in Chicago. However, some neighbors were unhappy with the new hospital, fearing that it would lower property values. During its construction in the winter, a vandal cut the water mains, flooding the construction site. When the Columbus Extension Hospital was being built on the Near West Side, an arson attack on its grounds was thwarted.

In early second quarter 1912, Cabrini and several MSC sisters were visiting Naples, Italy. To return to the United States, they booked passage on the maiden voyage of the RMS Titanic to New York. However, after hearing about problems with the Columbus Extension Hospital in Chicago, Cabrini switched their bookings to an earlier voyage on a different ship. The Titanic sank in the North Atlantic with a massive loss of life, on April 15 of that year. During her lifetime, Cabrini made 24 transatlantic crossings.

On one of her final trips, Cabrini visited Southern California in 1916. She constructed a chapel above the San Fernando Valley on Mount Raphael to protect the residents from wildfires. It was relocated in 1970 to Burbank, California, to become part of the Mother Cabrini Shrine.

== Death ==
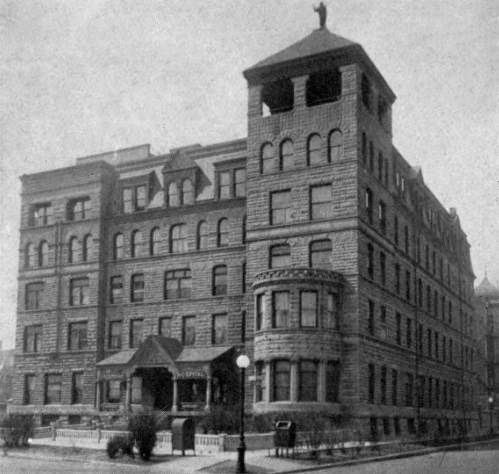
Columbus Hospital, Chicago, Illinois (1922)

In failing health, Cabrini traveled to Chicago in 1917 to be cared for by the MSC sisters there. On 21 December 1917, she was wrapping sweets she bought as Christmas gifts for children at the Italian school. The next morning, she felt too ill to leave her bed. Sisters visited with her intermittently to attend to business of the order, but eventually left her to rest. Shortly before noon, they discovered she had collapsed in her chair, with blood on her lips. She died suddenly, with some of her sisters around her, on 22 December, as a result of chronic endocarditis. She was 67 years old.

Cabrini's body lay in state at Columbus Hospital until 26 December, when it was transported from Chicago to New York City by train. Arriving two days later, she lay in state in New York until 31 December. On 1 January 1918, Cabrini was interred at a plot at the Saint Cabrini Home in West Park. In 1918, Cabrini was succeeded by Antonietta Della Casa as superior general of MSC.

== Legacy ==
During her lifetime, Cabrini founded 67 orphanages, schools and hospitals throughout the United States, Latin America, the Caribbean region, and in Europe. In 1926, the MSC achieved Cabrini's original goal of sending missionaries to China.

=== University facilities ===
- Cabrini Campus, Villanova University, Radnor, Pennsylvania,
- Cabrini Hall, Seton Hall University, South Orange, New Jersey
- Cabrini Hall, Thomas More University, Crestview Hills, Kentucky
- Cabrini University, founded in Radnor, Pennsylvania, in 1957. Closed in 2024
- Frances Xavier Cabrini Hall, Sacred Heart University, Fairfield Connecticut

=== Schools ===
- Cabrini High School, New Orleans
- Mother Cabrini Catholic School, Toronto, Ontario
- Mother Cabrini High School in the Washington Heights section of Manhattan (closed 2014)
- St. Brigid-St. Frances Cabrini Catholic Academy, Brooklyn, New York
- St. Francis Cabrini Academy, St. Louis, Missouri
- St. Francis Cabrini Catholic School, Alamogordo, New Mexico
- St. Francis Cabrini Catholic School, Allen Park, Michigan
- St. Francis Cabrini Catholic School, Lakewood, Washington
- St. Francis Cabrini Catholic School, Philadelphia
- St. Francis Cabrini Catholic School, San Jose, California
- St. Francis Cabrini School, Alexandria, Louisiana
- St. Francis Cabrini School, Brooklyn, New York
- St. Francis Cabrini School, West Bend, Indiana
- St. Francis X. Cabrini School, Los Angeles, California

=== Others ===
- Cabrini statue, St. Peter's Square, Vatican City
- Mother Cabrini Center, Archdiocese of San Antonio
- Mother Cabrini Institute on Immigration, Villanova University
- Mother Cabrini Memorial, Battery Park, Manhattan
- Cabrini Co-op, Institute for Catholic Liberal Education, Coeur D'Alene, Idaho
- Cabrini Teaching Fellows, Archdiocese of Denver
- Cabrini Institute for Teacher Development, Diocese of Manchester, Manchester, New Hampshire

== Veneration ==
In 1921, Peter Smith was born in Columbus Hospital in New York. He was blinded when a nurse accidentally administered what could have been a supposed 50% silver nitrate solution into his eyes. The doctors said that Smith's corneas were destroyed and that he was permanently blind. The mother superior of the hospital later touched a relic of Cabrini to his eyes and pinned a medal of Cabrini to his gown. The nurse who gave Smith the eyedrops prayed for the intercession of Cabrini to help him. When the doctors examined Smith 72 hours later, his eyes were normal. Smith then survived a severe bout of pneumonia. The Vatican cited this case as a miracle in 1938. However, corneal recovery after being exposed to a solution with a very high silver nitrate concentration has been reported on different occasions in non-religious contexts.

Sister Delphina Grazioli, an MSC sister, was dying after four surgical procedures in Seattle from 1925 to 1929. She allegedly saw a vision of Cabrini and then made a miraculous recovery. The Vatican accepted this also in 1938 as a miracle from Cabrini.

In 1933, the MSC exhumed Cabrini's body and divided it as part of her canonization process. They sent her head to the MSC motherhouse in Rome for display in its chapel. Her heart went to Codogno and her arm bone to the National Shrine of Saint Frances Xavier Cabrini in Chicago. The sisters sent the rest of her remains to the St. Frances Xavier Cabrini Shrine in New York City. The thousands of letters that she wrote, particularly to her sisters, were also examined during her canonization process.

Citing the Smith and Grazioli cures, Pope Pius XI beatified Cabrini on 13 November 1938. Smith, now a priest, attended the ceremony. Pope Pius XII canonised Cabrini on 7 July 1946. After Cabrini was canonised, an estimated 120,000 people attended a mass of thanksgiving at Soldier Field in Chicago.

In 1950, Pius XII named Cabrini as the patron saint of immigrants, recognizing her efforts worldwide to build schools, orphanages and hospitals. Pope Francis has stated that Cabrini's charitable works in Argentina inspired him to become a priest.

Pope Leo XIV links Cabrini with John Baptist Scalabrini in his commendation of these "two great saints [who] distinguished themselves in the pastoral care of migrants.

In the Roman Martyrology, Cabrini's feast day is 22 December, the anniversary of her death. This is the day ordinarily chosen as a saint's feast day. Following the reforms in Pope John XXIII's Code of Rubrics in 1960, the United States has celebrated Cabrini's feast day on 13 November, her beatification day. This change was made to avoid conflicting with the greater ferias of Advent.

== Shrines ==
=== National Shrine of Saint Frances Xavier Cabrini ===
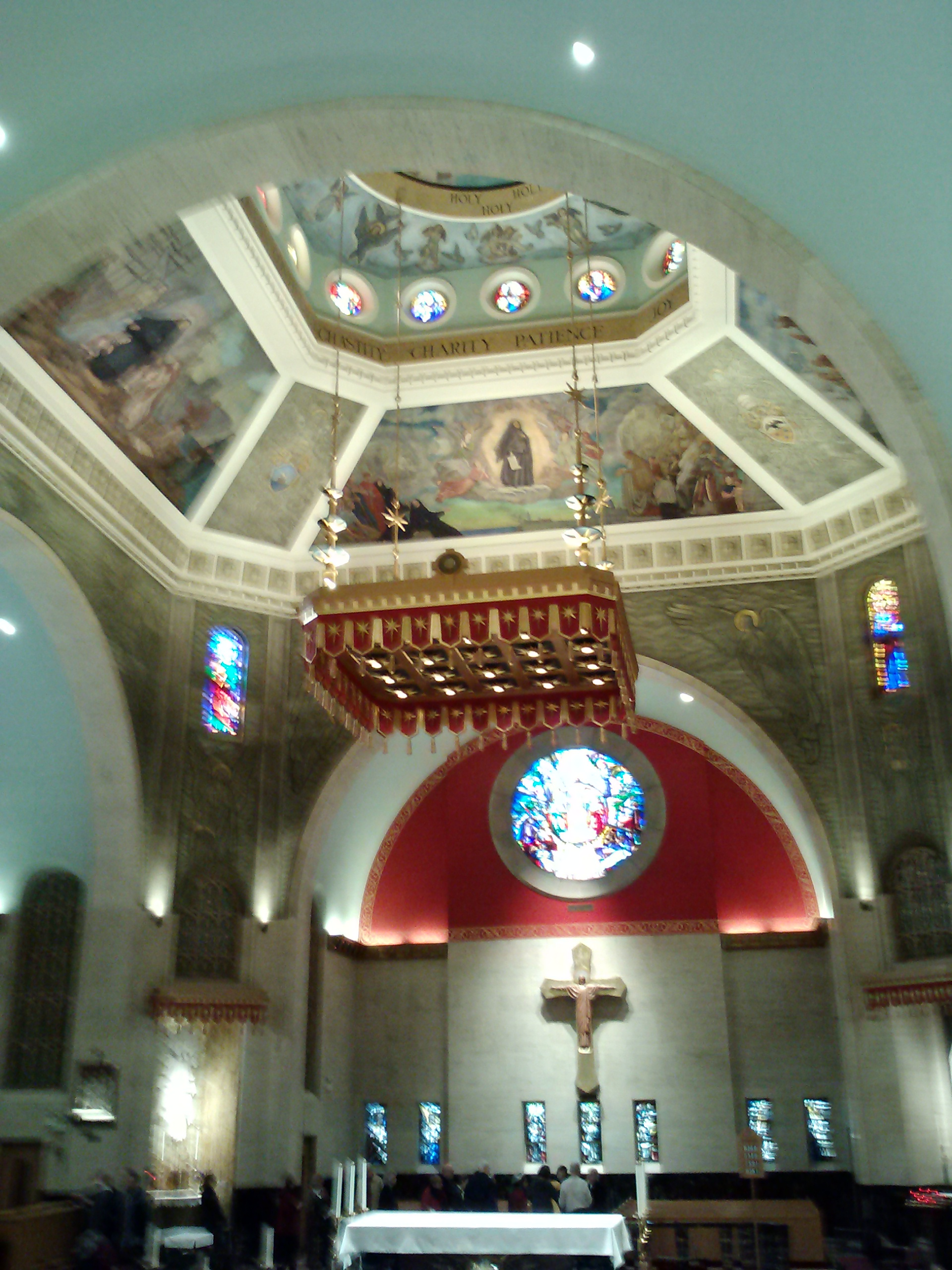
National Shrine of Saint Frances Xavier Cabrini in Chicago, Illinois (2017)

The National Shrine of Saint Frances Xavier Cabrini is located in the Lincoln Park neighborhood of Chicago. When the shrine was founded in 1955, it was located within the Columbus Hospital complex in Chicago. Cabrini had founded the hospital in 1905, lived and worked there, and died there in 1917. After Cabrini's canonization in 1946, the archdiocese decided that it needed a shrine in her honor. When the hospital was demolished for a high rise development in 2002, the shrine closed for ten years. It was relocated next to the new development and renovated.

Cardinal Francis George rededicated the National Shrine in 2012. Today, it contains gold mosaics, Carrara marble, frescoes, and Florentine stained glass,. It also preserves the hospital room from the Columbus Hospital where Cabrini died. Visitors use the shrine today for worship, spiritual care, and pilgrimage.

=== Mother Cabrini Shrine ===
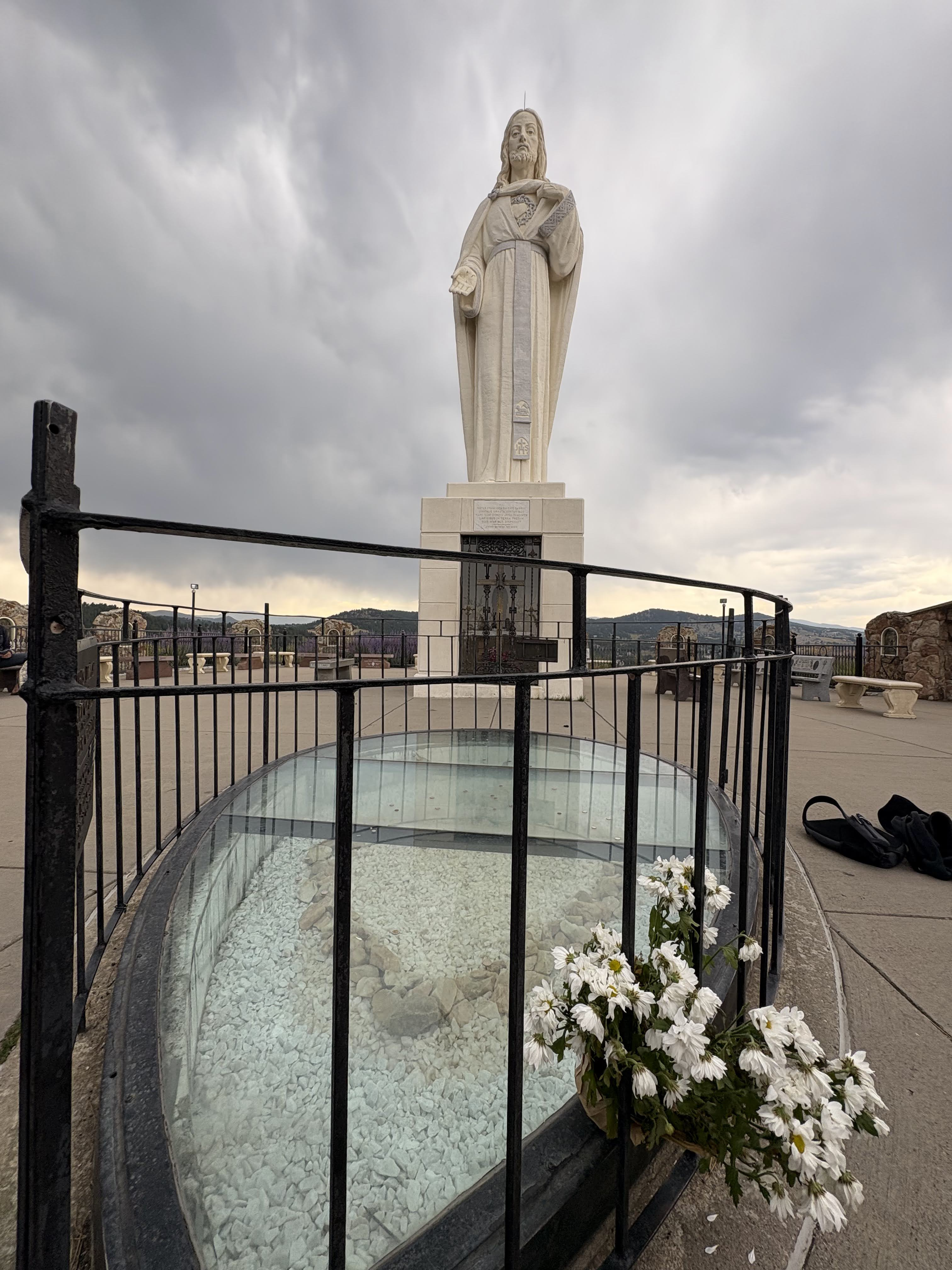
The Sacred Heart of Jesus Statue above the original Heart of Stones placed by Mother Cabrini in 1912.

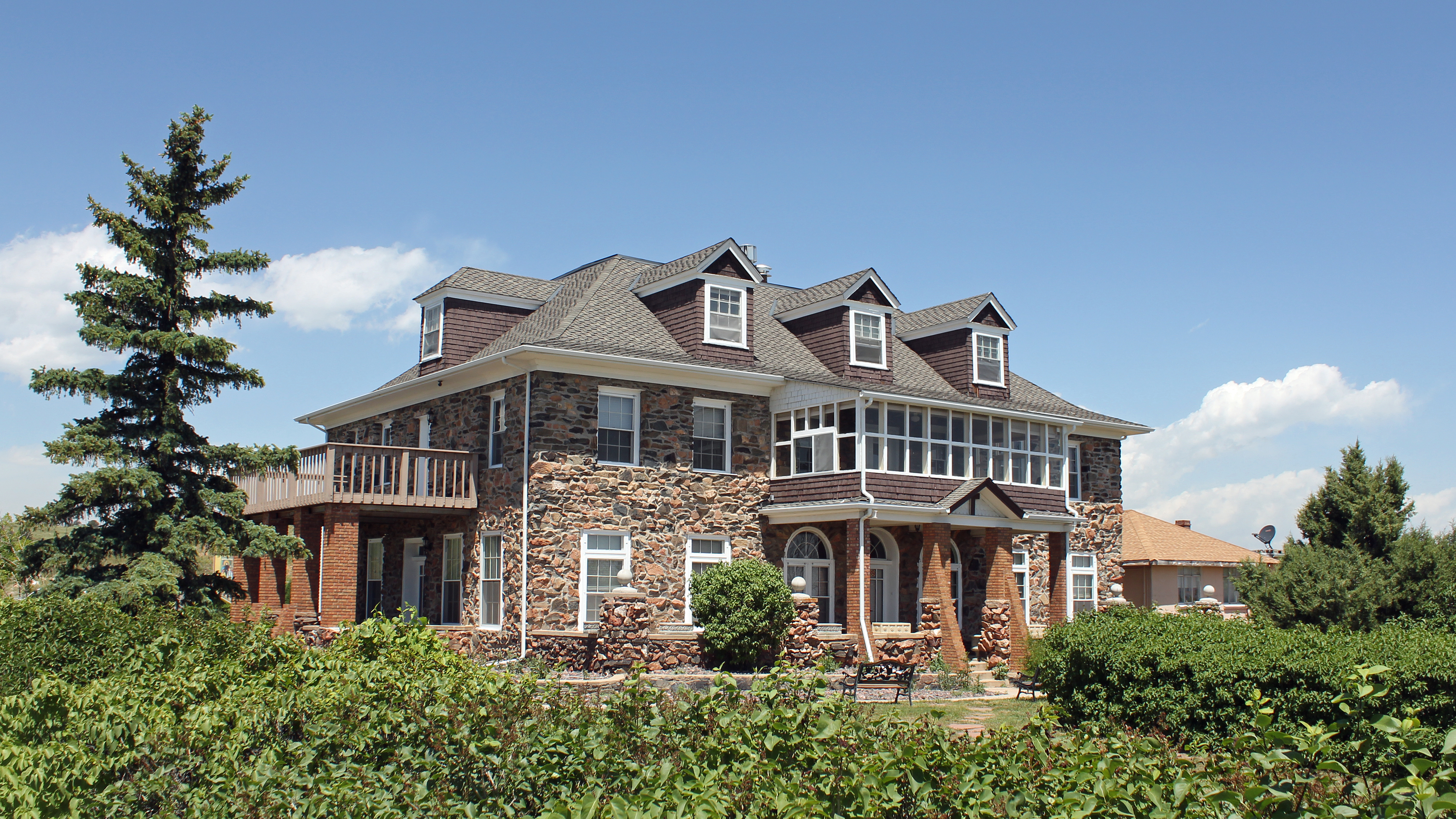
Stone House at Mother Cabrini Shrine in Golden, Colorado (2014)

The Mother Cabrini Shrine is located on Lookout Mountain in Golden, Colorado. Cabrini purchased the property in 1910 to serve as a summer camp for the girls from her Queen of Heaven Orphanage in Denver. She built the Stone House at the camp in 1914 to serve as the girls dormitory.

After Cabrini's canonization in 1946, the MSC converted the summer camp into the Mother Cabrini Shrine. It contains a footpath partway up Lookout Mountain, marked with the Stations of the Cross, that ends at a 22-foot (7 m) statue of Jesus. The shrine campus includes a convent, visitor accommodations, a chapel and an exhibit of Cabrini artifacts. The statues and stained-glass windows in the chapel originated from the former Villa Cabrini Academy in Burbank, California.

=== St. Frances Xavier Cabrini Shrine ===
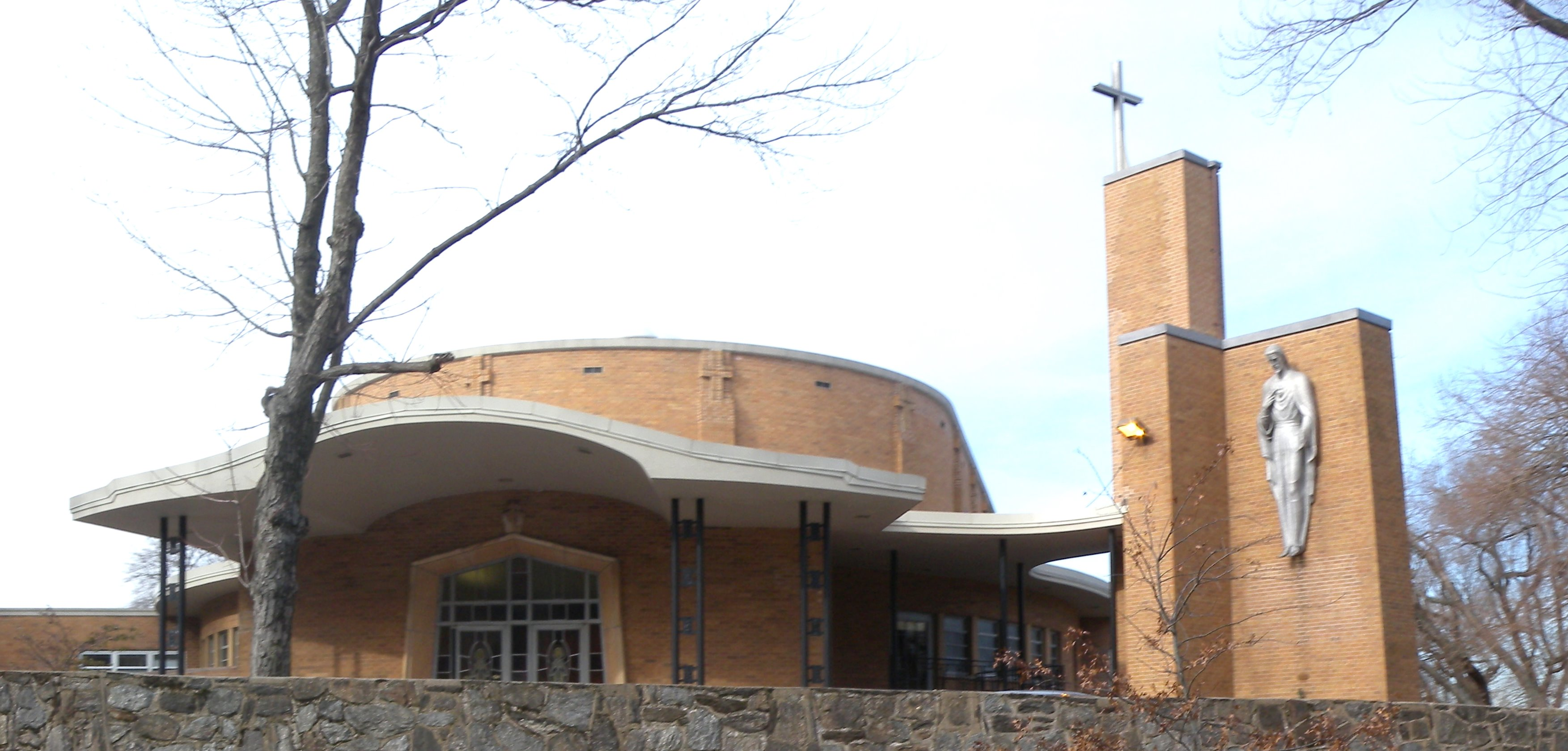
St. Frances Xavier Cabrini Shrine in New York City (2010)

The St. Frances Xavier Cabrini Shrine is located in the Hudson Heights neighborhood of New York City. Cabrini purchased the property in 1899 to establish a school for the girls of wealthy families. In 1930, the MSC established the Mother Cabrini High School on the property. They moved the Cabrini remains from the MSC property in West Park, New York, in 1938 to a glass-enclosed coffin under the altar of the high school chapel.

Cabrini's canonization in 1946 brought a huge influx of visitors to the school chapel. To accommodate them, the sisters in 1960 moved her remains out of the high school to a separate shrine building on the campus. They now reside in a large bronze-and-glass reliquary casket in the shrine's altar. Cabrini's body is covered with her religious habit and a sculpted face mask and hands for viewing.

=== Other shrines ===
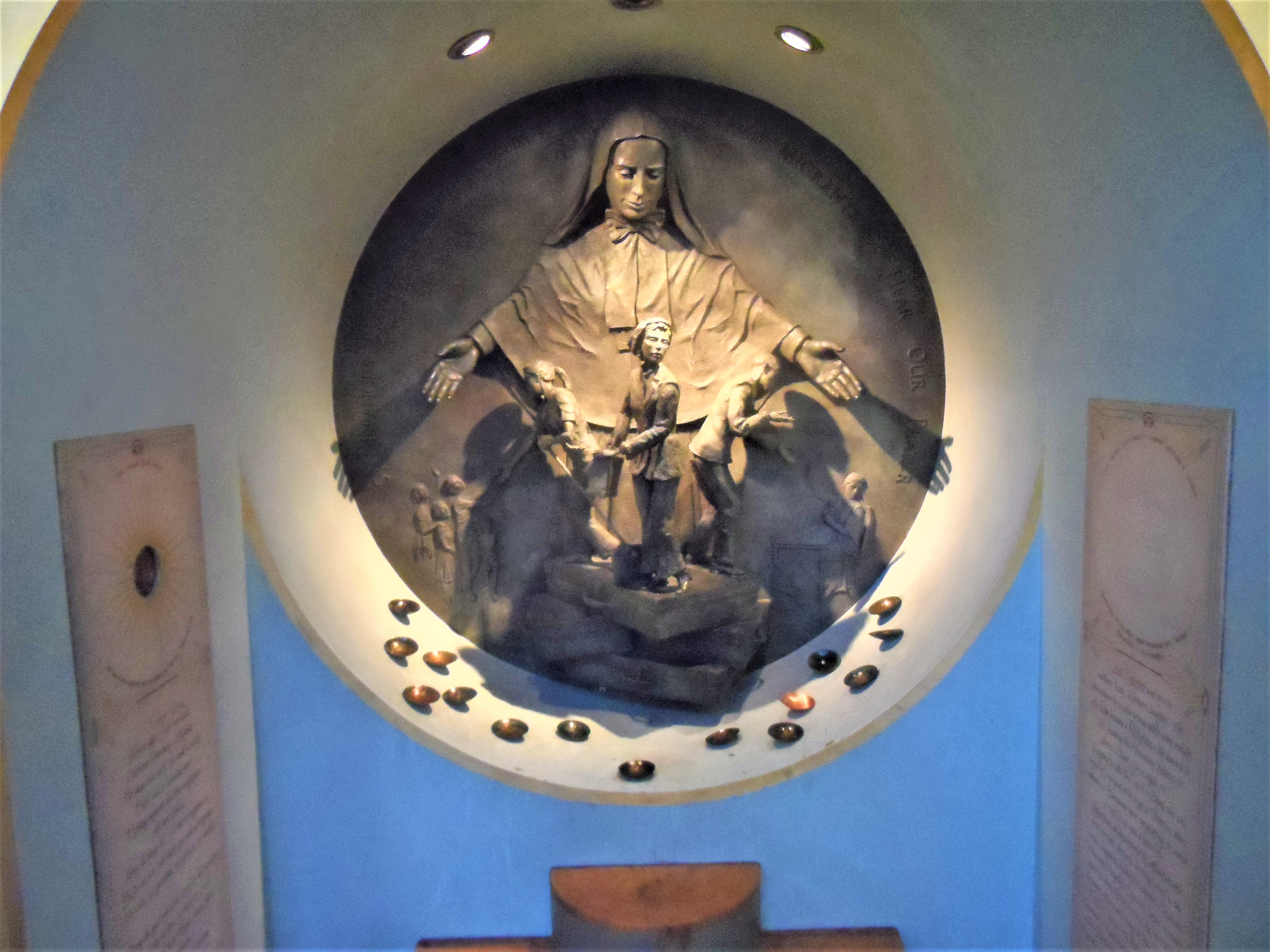
Mother Cabrini Shrine in St George's Cathedral, Southwark, London, England (2019)

- The Mother Cabrini Shrine at St George's Cathedral in London, was dedicated by Archbishop Kevin McDonald in 2009. Cabrini had worshipped at St. George while on a visit to London. The shrine occupies a former confessional in the cathedral and contains a bronze sculpture of Carbrini watching over migrants who stand on a pile of suitcases.
- The Mother Cabrini Shrine in Burbank, California is located near the site of the former Villa Cabrini Academy, founded in 1937 by her order. The shrine consists of a chapel that Cabrini erected in the San Fernando Valley in 1916. The Italian Catholic Federation relocated the chapel to St. Francis Xavier Church in 1973 to save it from demolition. The federation added a library wing to the shrine in 1993.
- The Shrine of Mother Cabrini is located on the campus of the Basilica of the National Shrine of Our Lady of Fatima in Lewiston, New York.
- Our Lady of Pompeii Church in New York city has a shrine, a statue, and a stained-glass window dedicated to Cabrini. She and her Missionary Sisters taught religious education there.
- The Mother Cabrini Shrine in Peru, New York, is a stone grotto on the grounds of St. Patrick Church. It was dedicated in 1947.
- St. Peter's Basilica in Vatican City has an 18-foot (5.5 m) statue of "S. Francisca Xaveria Cabrini", included among saints who founded religious congregations.

== Legacy ==
=== Churches and parishes ===
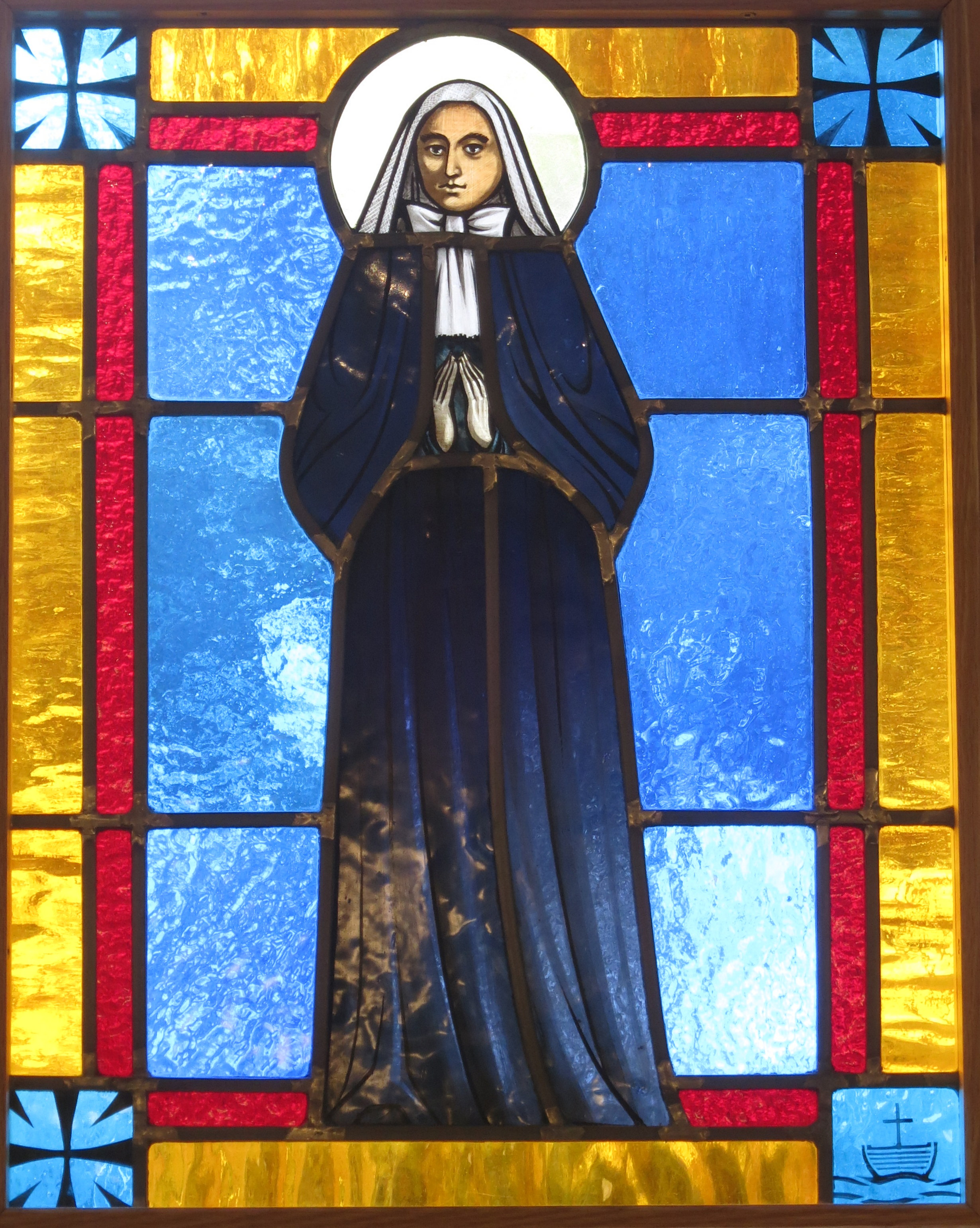
Stained glass window of Mother Cabrini at St. Stephen Church in Chesapeake, Virginia

==== Italy ====
- St. Frances Cabrini Parish (Parrocchia di Santa Francesca Cabrini), Codogno
- St. Frances Xavier Cabrini Parish (Parrocchia Santa Francesca Saverio Cabrini), Lodi
- St. Frances Cabrini Parish (Parrocchia di Santa Francesca Cabrini), Rome

==== United States ====
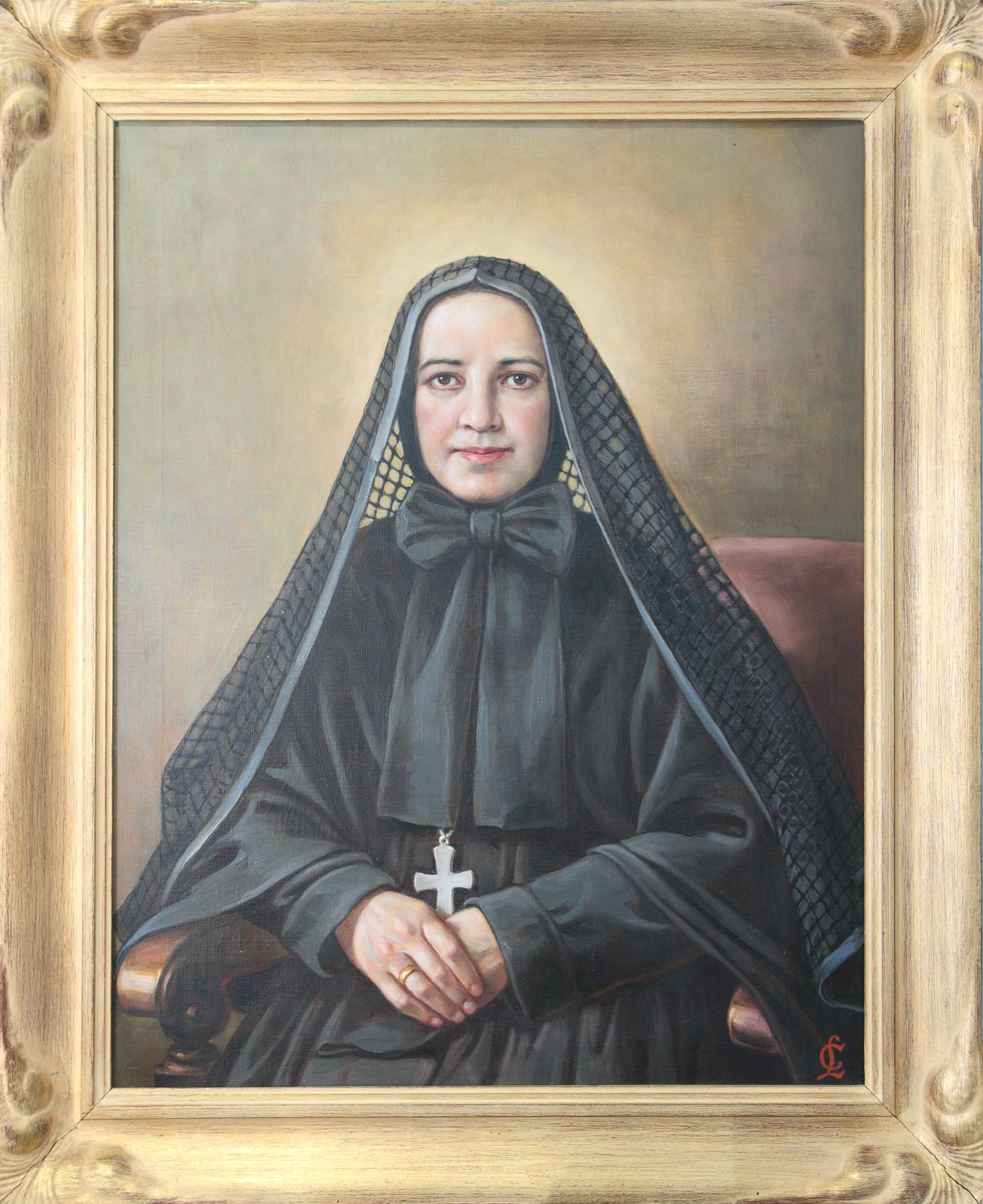
Mother Cabrini

- St. Frances Cabrini Church in Camp Verde, Arizona
- St. Frances Cabrini - Our Lady of Lavang Catholic Church in Tucson, Arizona
- St. Frances Xavier Cabrini Catholic Church in Crestline, California
- St. Frances X Cabrini Catholic Church in Los Angeles, California
- St. Frances Cabrini Parish in San Jose, California
- St. Frances X Cabrini Catholic Church in Yucaipa, California
- St. Frances Cabrini Catholic Church in Littleton, Colorado
- St. Frances Cabrini Church in North Haven, Connecticut, now part of St. Elizabeth of the Trinity Parish
- St. Frances Cabrini Catholic Church in Parrish, Florida
- St. Frances Xavier Cabrini Catholic Parish in Spring Hill, Florida
- St. Frances Xavier Cabrini Catholic Church in St. Cloud, Florida
- St. Frances Cabrini Church in Savannah, Georgia
- St. Frances Cabrini Parish in Springfield, Illinois
- St. Frances Xavier Cabrini Church in Livonia, Louisiana
- Former St. Frances Cabrini Church in New Orleans, Louisiana, built in 1953 and destroyed by Hurricane Katrina in 2005
- Former St. Frances X. Cabrini Church in Scituate, Massachusetts, closed in 2004
- St. Frances Cabrini Church in Allen Park, Michigan
- Church of St. Frances Cabrini in Minneapolis, Minnesota
- St. Frances Cabrini Church in Omaha, Nebraska, a historic landmark and former cathedral
- St. Frances Cabrini Church in Ocean City, New Jersey, now part of St. Damien Parish
- St. Frances Cabrini Church in Piscataway, New Jersey
- St. Frances Cabrini Church in Brooklyn, New York
- St. Frances Cabrini R.C. Church in Coram, New York
- Cabrini Parish in Rochester, New York
- St. Frances Cabrini Church on Roosevelt Island, New York, now part of East River Catholics
- St. Frances Cabrini Catholic Church in Colerain, Ohio
- St. Frances Xavier Cabrini Catholic Church in Lorain, Ohio
- St. Frances Cabrini Catholic Church in Aliquippa, Pennsylvania. Now part of Mary Queen of Saints Roman Catholic Parish
- St. Frances Cabrini Catholic Community in Fairless Hills, Pennsylvania
- Mother Cabrini Parish in Shamokin, Pennsylvania
- St. Frances Cabrini Church in Lebanon, Tennessee
- St. Frances Xavier Cabrini Catholic Church in El Paso, Texas
- St. Frances Cabrini & St. Rose of Lima Catholic Church in Granbury, Texas
- Saint Frances Cabrini Mission Church in Hargill, Texas
- St. Frances Cabrini Catholic Church in Houston, Texas
- St. Frances Cabrini Church in Laredo, Texas
- Mother Cabrini Parish in Pharr, Texas
- Saint Frances Cabrini Church in San Antonio, Texas
- St. Frances Xavier Cabrini Parish in Benton City, Washington
- St. Frances Cabrini Catholic Church in Lakewood, Washington
- St. Frances Cabrini Parish in West Bend, Wisconsin

==== Other countries ====
- St Francesca Cabrini Italian Church in Bedford, England

=== Educational institutions ===
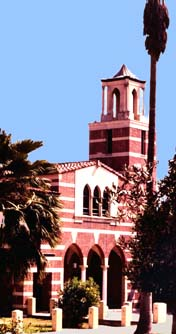
Villa Cabrini Academy, Burbank, California

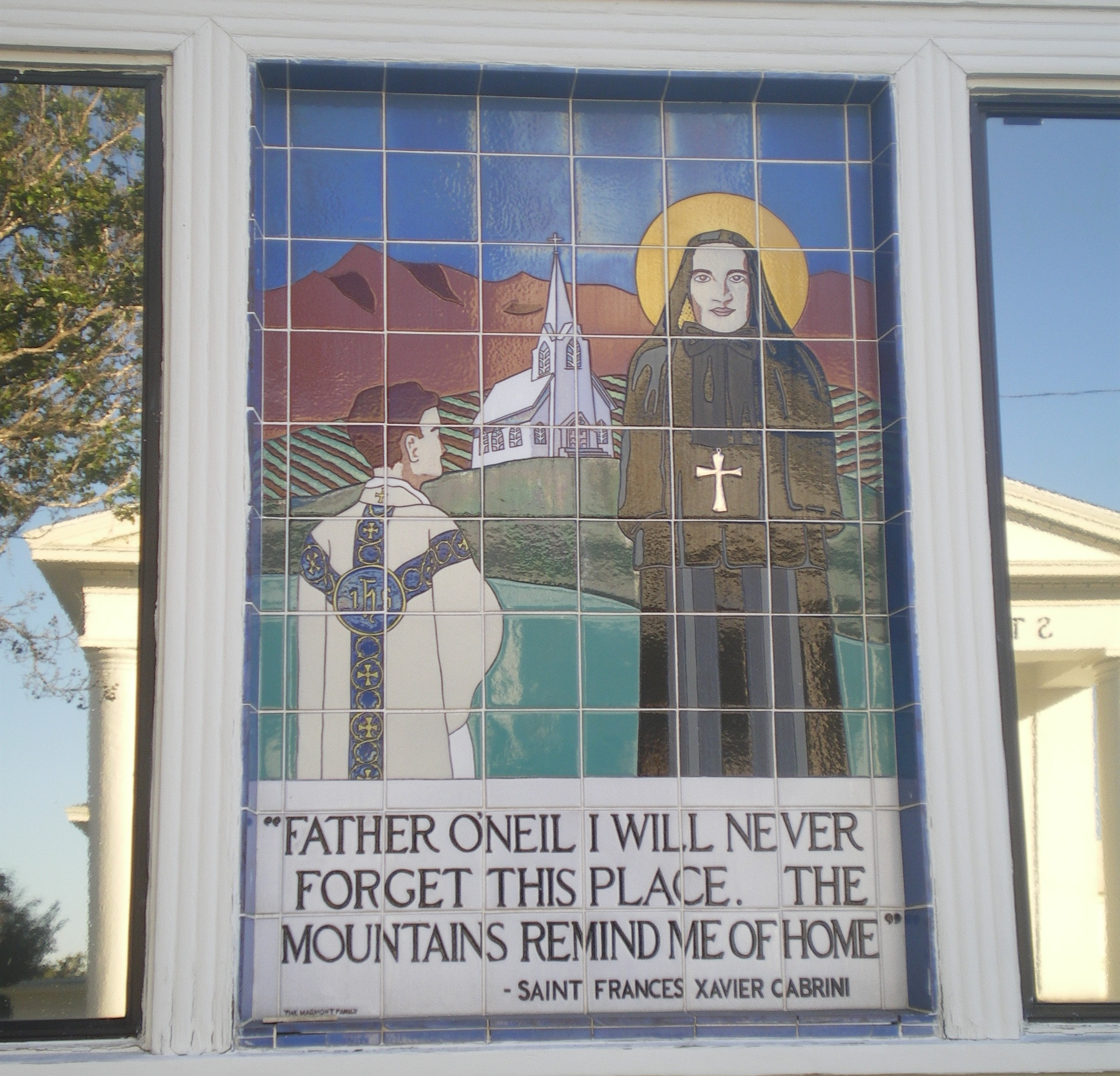
Mother Cabrini Mosaic at St. Robert Bellarmine School, Burbank, California (2008)

==== Italy ====
- Istituto Comprensivo "F.S. Cabrini" in Milan

==== United States ====
- The former Villa Cabrini Academy (1937–1970) in Burbank, California
- St. Frances X. Cabrini Catholic School in Los Angeles, California
- St. Frances Cabrini School in Savannah, Georgia
- Cabrini High School in New Orleans, Louisiana
- Cabrini High School in Allen Park, Michigan
- St. Frances Cabrini Academy elementary school in St. Louis, Missouri
- Saint Frances Cabrini Catholic Academy in Brooklyn, New York
- The former Mother Cabrini High School (1899–2014) in Manhattan, New York
- St. Frances Cabrini Catholic School in Philadelphia, Pennsylvania
- Cabrini University in Radnor, Pennsylvania
- The former St. Frances Cabrini School (now the Cabrini Apartments) on St. Frances Cabrini Avenue in Scranton, Pennsylvania
- Cabrini Co-op in Coeur d’Alene, Idaho
- Mother Cabrini School in Caparra Heights, Puerto Rico

==== Brazil ====
===== São Paulo =====
- Casa Provincial, São Paulo
- Casa Santa Cabrini, São Paulo
- Casa São José, São Paulo
- Casa N. Sra. de Caravaggio, São Paulo
- Casa Sagrado Coração de Jesus, São Paulo
- Centro Social da Criança, Luz (bairro de São Paulo)
- Centro Assistencial Santana, Jd. Ana Lúcia

===== Other cities =====
- Obra Social Santa Cabrini, Tijuca, Rio de Janeiro
- Obra Social Santa Cabrini, Vila do João, Rio de Janeiro
- Centro da Juventude Santa Cabrini, Teresina
- Casa Nossa Senhora das Graças, Cajazeiras
- Casa Fraternidade Irmã Rafaela, Itapecuru-Mirim

=== Schools ===
==== United States ====
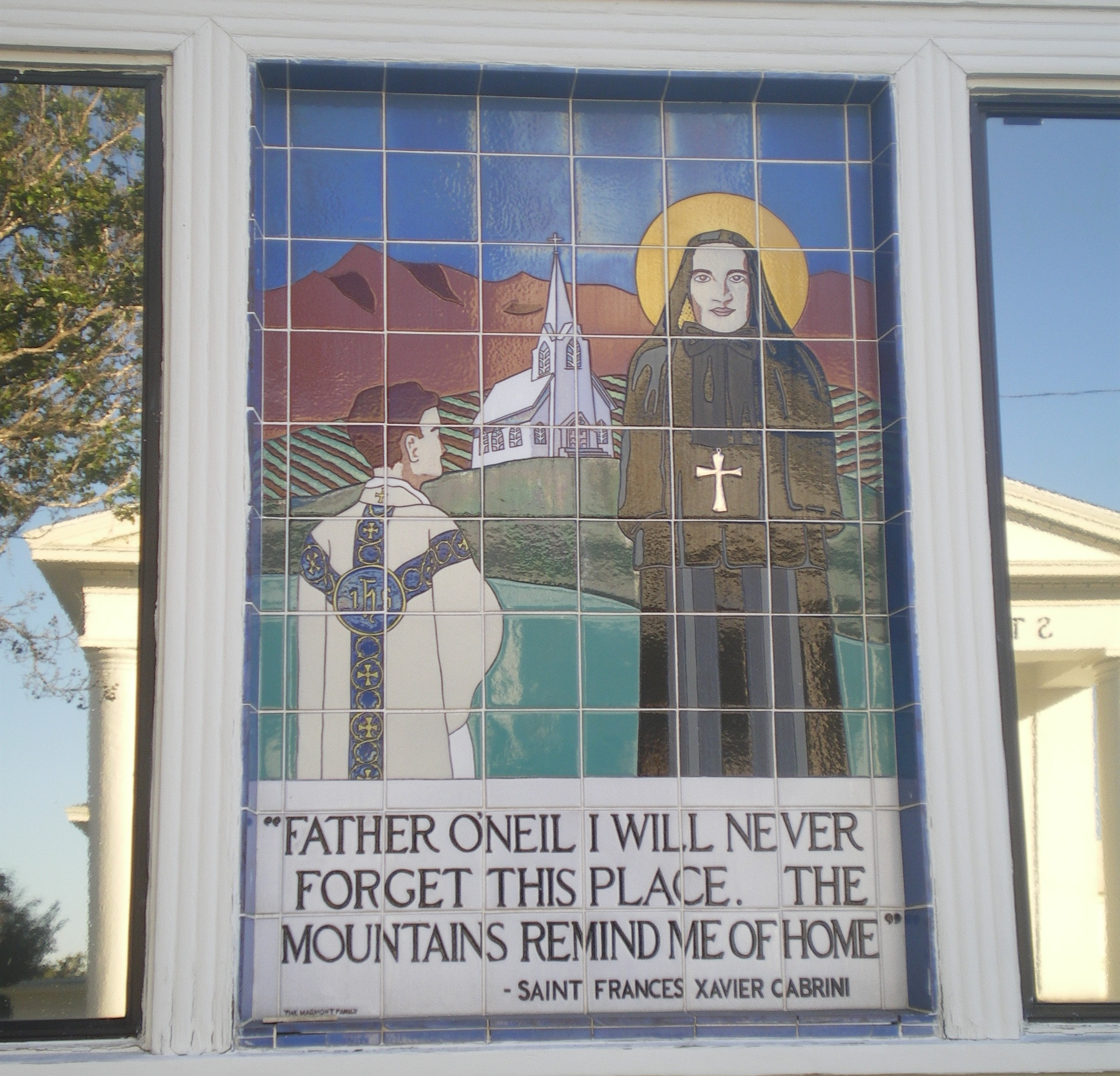
Cabrini mosaic at St. Robert Bellarmine School.

- St. Francis Cabrini School, Lakewood. Washington
- Cabrini High School, New Orleans, Louisiana
- Mother Cabrini High School, New York City
- St. Frances Cabrini Catholic School, Philadelphia, Pennsylvania
- Cabrini Catholic School, Allen Park, Michigan
- Saint Frances Cabrini Catholic School, San Jose, California
- St. Brigid - St. Frances Cabrini Academy, Brooklyn, New York
- St. Frances Cabrini Academy, St. Louis, Missouri

==== Other nations ====
- Instituto Cabrini in Buenos Aires, Argentina
- Colégio Regina Coeli, Rio Pomba, Brazil
- Colégio Boni Consilii, Campos Elíseos, Brazil
- Colégio Madre Cabrini, São Paulo, Brazil
- Centro de Formação e Espiritualidade Cabriniana, Tijuca, Brazil
- St. Frances Cabrini Elementary School, Delhi, Ontario, Canada
- Mother Cabrini Catholic School in Etobicoke, Ontario, Canada
- Ensemble Scolaire Françoise Cabrini in Noisy-le-Grand, France (former orphanage)
- LPU-St. Cabrini College of Allied Medicine in Calamba, Laguna, Philippines
- Colegio Santa Francisca Javier Cabrini in Madrid, Spain

=== Hospitals ===
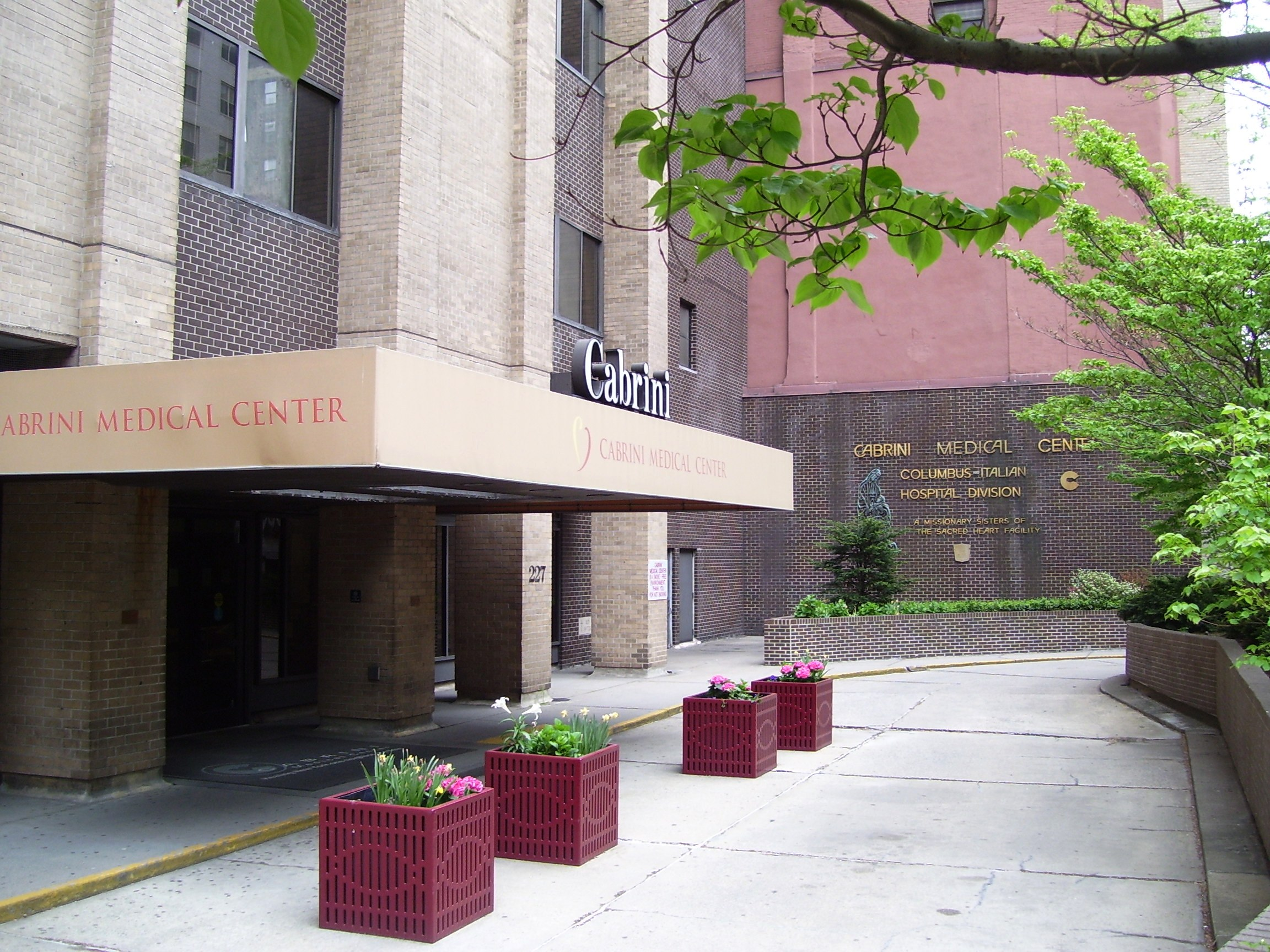
Former Cabrini Medical Center, New York City

- St Francis Xavier Cabrini Hospital, opened by MSC in 1958 in Melbourne, Victoria, in Australia. It is now Cabrini Health, a network of hospitals and other facilities.
- Santa Cabrini Hospital, founded in 1960 in Montreal, Quebec, Canada
- St. Frances Cabrini Medical Center and Cancer Institute in Santo Tomas City, Batangas, in Philippines
- The former St. Cabrini Hospital in Chicago, Illinois, founded in 1910 as the Columbus Hospital Extension. It became St. Cabrini Hospital in 1946
- Christus St. Frances Cabrini Hospital in Alexandria, Louisiana, founded shortly after her canonization, and named because Bishop Charles Greco had met her in his childhood
- The former Cabrini Medical Center in New York City. It was formed by a merger with Columbus Hospital, co-founded by Cabrini in 1892

=== Film ===
Cabrini (2024): Cabrini is portrayed by Cristiana Dell'Anna

=== Institutions with Cabrini name ===
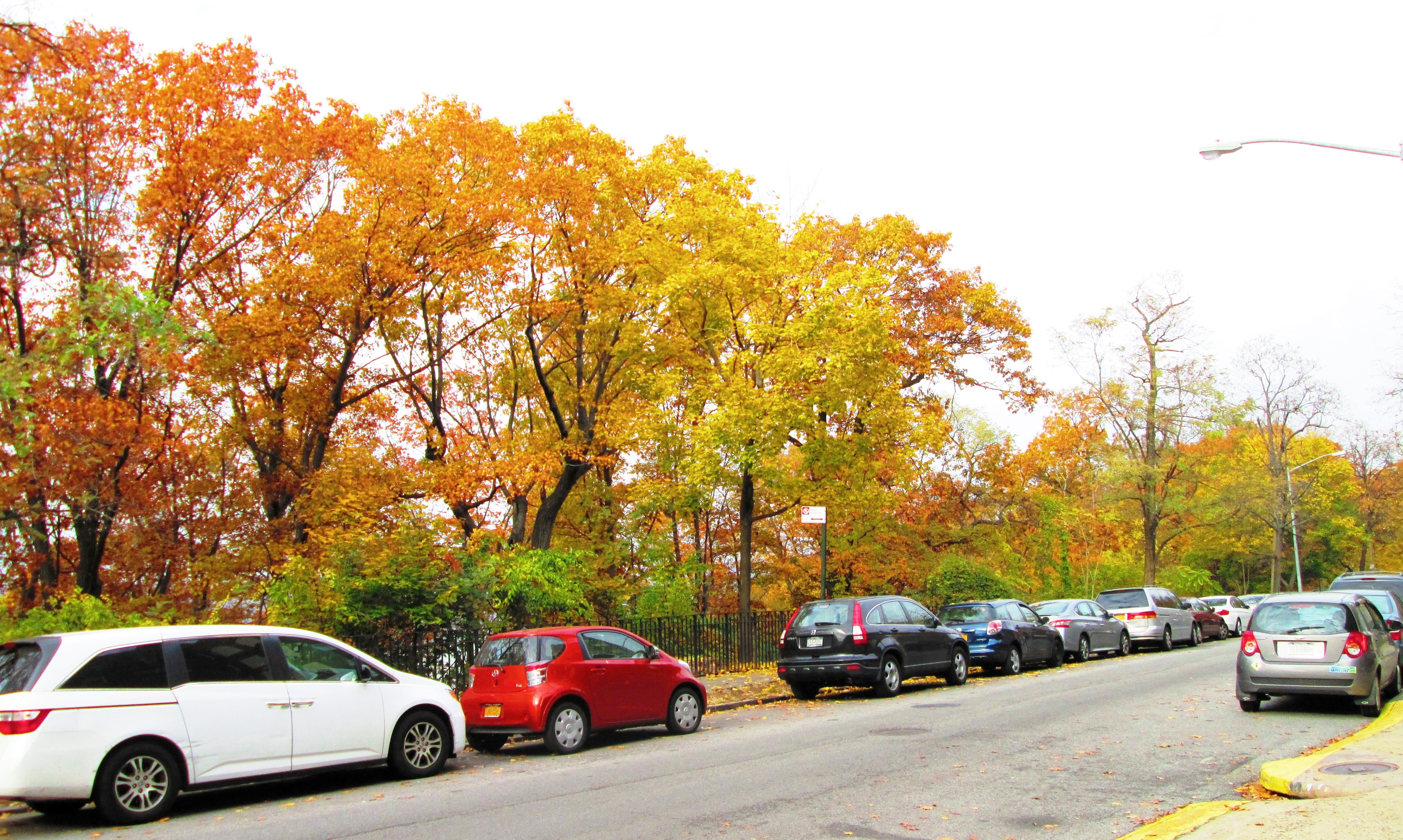
Cabrini Woods Nature Sanctuary, New York City

- The former St. Cabrini Home in West Park, New York. Was Cabrini's first orphanage, the American MSC headquarters and her original burial place. The facility closed in 2011.
- The Cabrini Museum and Spirituality Center occupies the convent that Cabrini founded in Codogno, Italy in 1880.
- The former Cabrini University in Radnor, Pennsylvania. Founded by the MSC in 1958, it closed in 2024. Now part of Villanova University.
- RSA Santa Francesca Cabrini is a residential care facility for the elderly in Codogno.
- The Cabrini Mission Foundation, founded in 1998, supports Cabrini programs worldwide and institutions focused on health care, education, and social services.
- Cabrini of Westchester consists of two residential facilities for the elderly in Manhattan and Dobbs Ferry, New York that are operated by the MSC.
- The Cabrini–Green public housing project in Chicago, built between 1942 and 1962. The high rise sections of the project were demolished in 1995.
- Cabrini Boulevard in Manhattan, New York.
- Cabrini Woods Nature Sanctuary in Fort Tryon Park in Manhattan in New York
- Mother Cabrini Park in Newark, New Jersey. It includes a statue of Cabrini on the site of a school she founded.
- Mother Cabrini Park in Brooklyn, New York, in 1992, located on the site of a school Cabrini founded.
- The Cabrini-Zentrum near Offenstetten, Germany, is a school and home for orphans and special needs children, with disabilities. It was founded by the Katholische Jugendfürsorge Regensburg in 1946.
- Mother Cabrini Center in the Archdiocese of San Antonio for training religious sisters from other nations.
- Villa Cabrini, a not-for-profit independent residential complex for seniors located in Winnipeg, MB, Canada.

== Honors ==
- Cabrini was inducted into the National Women's Hall of Fame in Seneca Falls, New York, in 1996.
- Cabrini was inducted into the Colorado Women's Hall of Fame in 2022.
- The State of Colorado replaced its Columbus Day state holiday with Cabrini Day in 2020.
- A public memorial to Cabrini installed in 2020 in Battery Park City in Manhattan.
- A mural on the side of Arriana Condominium in Carroll Gardens, Brooklyn, painted in 2012, honors Cabrini and the Italian community.

== See also ==
- List of Americans venerated in the Catholic Church
- Italians in Chicago
- List of Catholic saints
- Saint Frances Xavier Cabrini, patron saint archive
- Italian Americans

== Bibliography ==
=== Nonfiction ===
- Maynard, Theodore. Too Small a World: The Life of Mother Frances Cabrini. Foreword by Timothy Cardinal Dolan. San Francisco: Ignatius Press, 2024 [original: 1945].
- De Donato, Pietro. Immigrant Saint: The Life of Mother Cabrini. New York: McGraw Hill, 1960.
- De Maria, Mother Saverio. Mother Frances Xavier Cabrini. Translated by Rose Basile Green. Chicago: Missionary Sisters of the Sacred Heart of Jesus, 1984.
- Travels of Mother Frances Xavier Cabrini: Foundress of the Missionary Sisters of the Sacred Heart of Jesus. Edited by Missionary Sisters of the Sacred Heart of Jesus. Chicago: Missionary Sisters of the Sacred Heart of Jesus, 1984.
- All Things Are Possible: The Selected Writings of Mother Cabrini. San Francisco: Ignatius Press, 2025.
- Journal of a Trusting Heart: Retreat Notes of St. Frances Xavier Cabrini, 1876-1911. Macao, China: Claretian Publications, 2023.

=== Fiction ===
- Gregory, Nicole. God's Messenger: The Astounding Achievements of Mother Frances X. Cabrini: A Novel. Washington, D.C.: Barbera Foundation, 2018.

=== Children and Young Adults ===
- Keyes, Frances Parkinson. Mother Cabrini: Missionary to the World. Vision Books. San Francisco: Ignatius Press, 1997.
- Andes, Mary Lou and Victoria Dority. Saint Frances Xavier Cabrini: Cecchina's Dream. Illustrated by Barbara Kiwak. Boston: Pauline Books, 2005.
