= Saint Frances Cabrini Parish =

Parish in San Jose, California, US

St. Frances Cabrini Parish
- Location within San Jose, California
- 37°15′37″N 121°56′14″W
- Location: 15333 Woodard Road; San Jose, California
- Country: USA
- Denomination: Roman Catholic
- Website: www.sfcabrini.org

History
- Status: Parish Church
- Founder: Rev. Fr. Robert Essig
- Dedication: St. Frances Xavier Cabrini

Architecture
- Functional status: Active

Administration
- Province: Ecclesiastical province of San Jose
- Archdiocese: Roman Catholic Diocese of San Jose
- Diocese: Dioecesis Sancti Josephi in California
- Deanery: Deanery 5

Clergy
- Bishop: The Most Rev. Oscar Cantu
- Vicar: Rev. Fr. Vincent Dang
- Pastor: Rev. Fr. James Okafor

Saint Frances Cabrini Parish is a territorial parish of the Roman Catholic Diocese of San Jose in California. The parish church is located in the Cambrian Park neighborhood of San Jose, California.

It was founded in the 1950s as a parish of the Archdiocese of San Francisco; its founding pastor was Fr. Robert Essig. The current church building was built in 1963 in San Jose, California. The parish is named for superior general Frances Cabrini, MSC, the first American citizen to be canonized by the Roman Catholic Church.

== See also ==
- Roman Catholic Diocese of San Jose in California
