= Cabrini Medical Center =

- Shown in New York City

Geography
- Location: 227 East 19th Street, New York, United States
- Coordinates: 40.7363°N 73.9838°W

Services
- Beds: 490 (in 1973)

History
- Founded: 1973
- Closed: 2008

Links
- Website: http://www.cabrininy.org (archived)
- Lists: Hospitals in New York State
- Other links: Hospitals in Manhattan

Cabrini Medical Center of New York City was created in 1973 by a merger of two Manhattan hospitals. It closed in 2008 due to financial difficulties cited by the Berger Commission, followed by a bankruptcy filing.

In January 2010, the five buildings formerly housing the medical center were purchased by Memorial Sloan-Kettering Cancer Center for $83.1 million, with plans to open an outpatient cancer facility; but in 2013 the buildings were sold to a developer to be converted into residences.

== Columbus Hospital ==
Columbus Hospital was founded in 1892 (the 400th anniversary of Columbus's voyage), incorporated in 1895, and formally opened on March 18, 1896, by the Missionary Sisters of the Sacred Heart of Jesus, to address the needs of Italian immigrants. The founding group included the now-canonized Mother Frances Xavier Cabrini, and among the first physicians of the hospital was George Frederick Shrady Sr.

The hospital was originally located in a former residence at 41 East 12th Street. In 1895 it moved to 226–228 East 20th Street, which had an approximate capacity of 100 beds. In 1913 it expanded again, acquiring "annex" facilities vacated by the New York Polyclinic Hospital at 214–218 East 34th Street.

== Italian Hospital and merger ==
Italian Hospital was founded in 1937 by the Italian Hospital Society, with the assets and the West 110th Street location of the defunct Parkway Hospital.

In July 1973, Columbus Hospital and Italian Hospital merged. The combined organization took the name Cabrini Health Care Center, after Mother Cabrini, and became a 490-bed facility located at 227 East 19th Street, between Second and Third Avenues near Gramercy Park. By 1976, it was using the name Cabrini Medical Center. In the 1980s, it was one of the earliest hospitals to develop expertise for the AIDS epidemic that became a leading cause of death in its neighborhood.

== Financial difficulties and closure ==
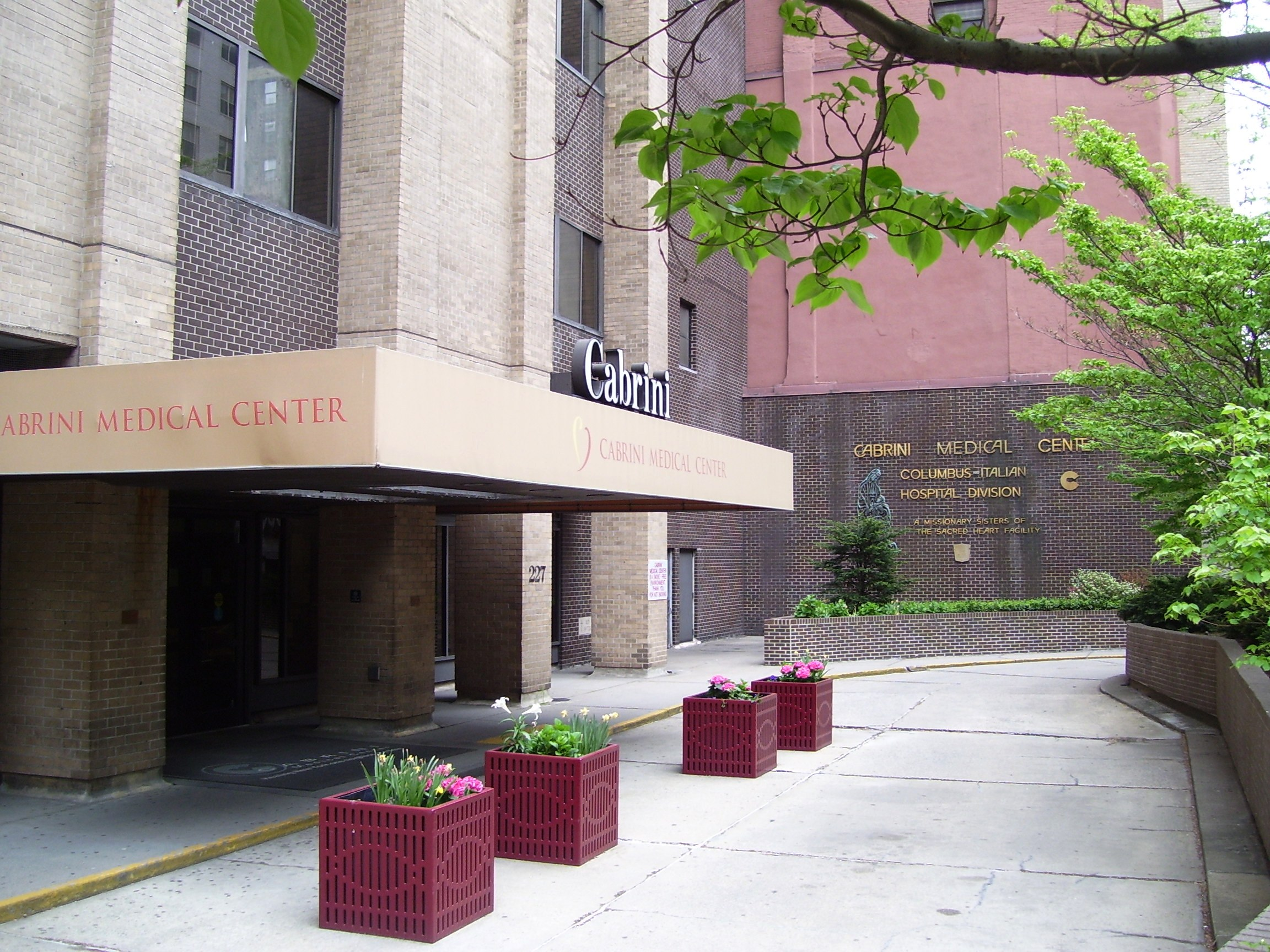
The main entrance in April 2010, two years after the hospital closed.

The center closed permanently on March 16, 2008, due to financial difficulties that resulted in patients and staff seeking other health care and employment.

On July 10, 2009, Cabrini Medical Center filed for Chapter 11 bankruptcy, citing assets of $46 million and liabilities of $167 million. The top-five secured creditors were the mortgage holder Sun Life Assurance Company of Canada ($35.1 million), Missionary Sisters of the Sacred Heart of Jesus in Chicago ($33 million), the New York branch of the Missionary Sisters ($18.7 million), Service Employees International Union National Benefits Fund ($5.1 million), and an affiliate of Saint Vincent's Catholic Medical Center ($4 million). The largest unsecured creditors were Consolidated Edison ($4.2 million), St. Vincent's ($3.2 million), and the Dormitory Authority of the State of New York ($2.6 million). Cabrini owed a $828,000 health facility assessment tax to New York State, $418,000 in fees to the New York State Department of Health, $412,000 in dues to the Healthcare Association of New York State, and $308,000 to Mount Sinai Hospital.

Medical staff residency training records and verification have become available through the Federation Credentials Verification Service.

== Current usage ==
Following the closure, the property was sold to developers and transformed into a luxury condo complex known as Gramercy Square which re-used some of the buildings while razing others and building new. The former emergency room is now a garden. Condo sales began in 2016 after several years of development.

The development of the former Cabrini site has led to members of the City Council and NYS Assembly exploring limitations on what can be done with Mount Sinai Beth Israel upon its closure and sale.
