= Saint Frances Cabrini School (Brooklyn) =

Saint Frances Cabrini Catholic Academy

Location
- 181 Suydam Street; Neighborhood of Bushwick; Brooklyn, New York; United States
- Coordinates: 40°42′00″N 73°55′34″W

Information
- School type: Private, Roman Catholic
- Established: 1922
- Status: Closed/merged
- Closed: 2019
- Color: Gray/navy/blue

Saint Frances Cabrini Catholic Academy was a small Catholic elementary and middle school in the neighborhood of Bushwick in Brooklyn, New York, for pre-K to eighth grade. It was associated with the National Catholic Educational Association (NCEA). The school closed June 2019 and merged with Saint Brigid Catholic Academy, also in Brooklyn, to become St. Brigid-St. Frances Cabrini Catholic Academy.

== History ==
The school opened in September 1922.

It was officially closed June 2019 by the Roman Catholic Diocese of Brooklyn due to changes in the demographics of the neighborhood leading to a decline in enrollment, and deferred building maintenance. The school was merged with the nearby Saint Brigid Catholic Academy (438 Grove Street, Brooklyn, New York, 11237) to become St. Brigid-St. Frances Cabrini Catholic Academy. The 438 Grove St building was renovated and inaugurated a STEM lab in the fall of 2019.

== Students ==
The student body was around 90 percent Hispanic, and the remaining student body consisted of African American, Asian, or Caucasian students. The teacher to student ratio was approximately 1:27.

An after-school program was offered to help working parents.
