= Cabrini High School (New Orleans) =

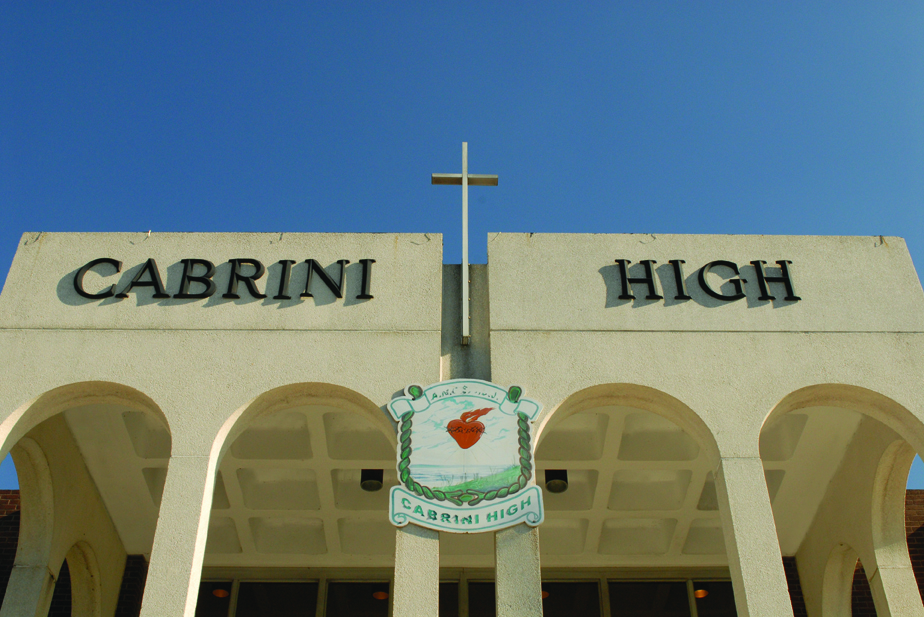

Location
- 1400 Moss Street; New Orleans, Louisiana 70119; United States
- Coordinates: 29°58′53″N 90°5′18″W

Information
- Type: Private
- Motto: Respect Excellence Service
- Religious affiliations: Roman Catholic (Missionaries of the Sacred Heart)
- Patron saint: St. Frances Xavier Cabrini
- Established: 1905 (orphanage), 1959 (present school)
- Founder: Mother Cabrini
- President: Uriel Durr
- Principal: Ashley Evison '76
- Chaplain: Fr. Kyle Sanders and Deacon Uriel Durr
- Teaching staff: 33.6 (FTE) (2019–20)
- Grades: 8–12
- Gender: Girls
- Student to teacher ratio: 11.0 (2019–20)
- Colors: Green and gold
- Mascot: Crescent Moon
- Team name: Crescents
- Accreditation: Southern Association of Colleges and Schools
- Newspaper: L'Envoye
- Yearbook: L'Etincelle
- School fees: $1,000 (2025-26)
- Tuition: $12,575 (2025-26)
- Affiliation: Archdiocese of New Orleans
- Dean of Students: Kasey Dennies
- Admissions Director: Jean Montgomery
- Website: www.cabrinihigh.com

Cabrini High School is an all-girls parochial high school in New Orleans, Louisiana. Cabrini is part of the New Orleans parochial school system.

The campus of Cabrini High School is located along Bayou St. John, near City Park and Esplanade Avenue.

== Athletics ==
Cabrini High athletics competes in the LHSAA. The nickname for the sports teams are the "Crescent".
