= St. Frances X. Cabrini Church (Scituate, Massachusetts) =

Coordinates: 42°13′09″N 70°45′13″W

Religion
- Affiliation: Independent Catholic, formerly Roman Catholic

Location
- Location: Scituate, Massachusetts
- Interactive map of St. Frances X. Cabrini Church

Architecture
- Architect: Oliver W. Fontaine
- Completed: 1961

Website
- link

St. Frances X. Cabrini Church was a church located in Scituate, Massachusetts. It was part of the Archdiocese of Boston until 2004, when it was officially closed, along with several other Boston-area parishes. Its former parishioners began a new congregation within the building, holding a round-the-clock vigil while they appealed the closure to various authorities. The vigil ended on May 30, 2016.

== History ==
The church was dedicated in 1961, its construction having been funded by local Catholics. It was named in honor of Frances Xavier Cabrini, the first American citizen to be canonized as a Roman Catholic saint

In October 2004, the Archdiocese of Boston announced the closure of several parishes, including St. Frances X. Cabrini, citing a lack of available priests. Like parishioners from eight other now-closed churches, members of the congregation began a vigil, holding independent services on Sundays and taking turns living inside the church, so that it would never be empty.

Over the years that followed, the other church vigils ended, by order of the Archdiocese of Boston, which owned the properties. The vigil at St. Frances became the only surviving church vigil from the 2004 closures. Parishioners set up a non-profit group, the Friends of St. Frances X. Cabrini, to advocate for themselves. In 2016, they appealed the closure to both the United States Supreme Court and Vatican leadership, but both declined the case.

On May 16, 2016, the Archdiocese of Boston ordered the parishioners to vacate the building. The congregation therefore held its final service on May 29, agreeing to use the local Masonic center until an independent church can be built. In 2018, the building was sold to the St. Mary & St. George Coptic Orthodox Church.
