= Vila do João =

Vila do João ("John's Village") is a favela in the neighborhood of Maré, Rio de Janeiro, Brazil.

In 1982, the Brazilian government built 1,500 homes in the region. The favela is named after João Baptista de Oliveira Figueiredo, the 30th president of Brazil.

It currently has about 4,000 households and a population estimated at nearly 12,000 people.
