= Mother Cabrini High School =

Coordinates: 40°51′28.4″N 73°56′8″W

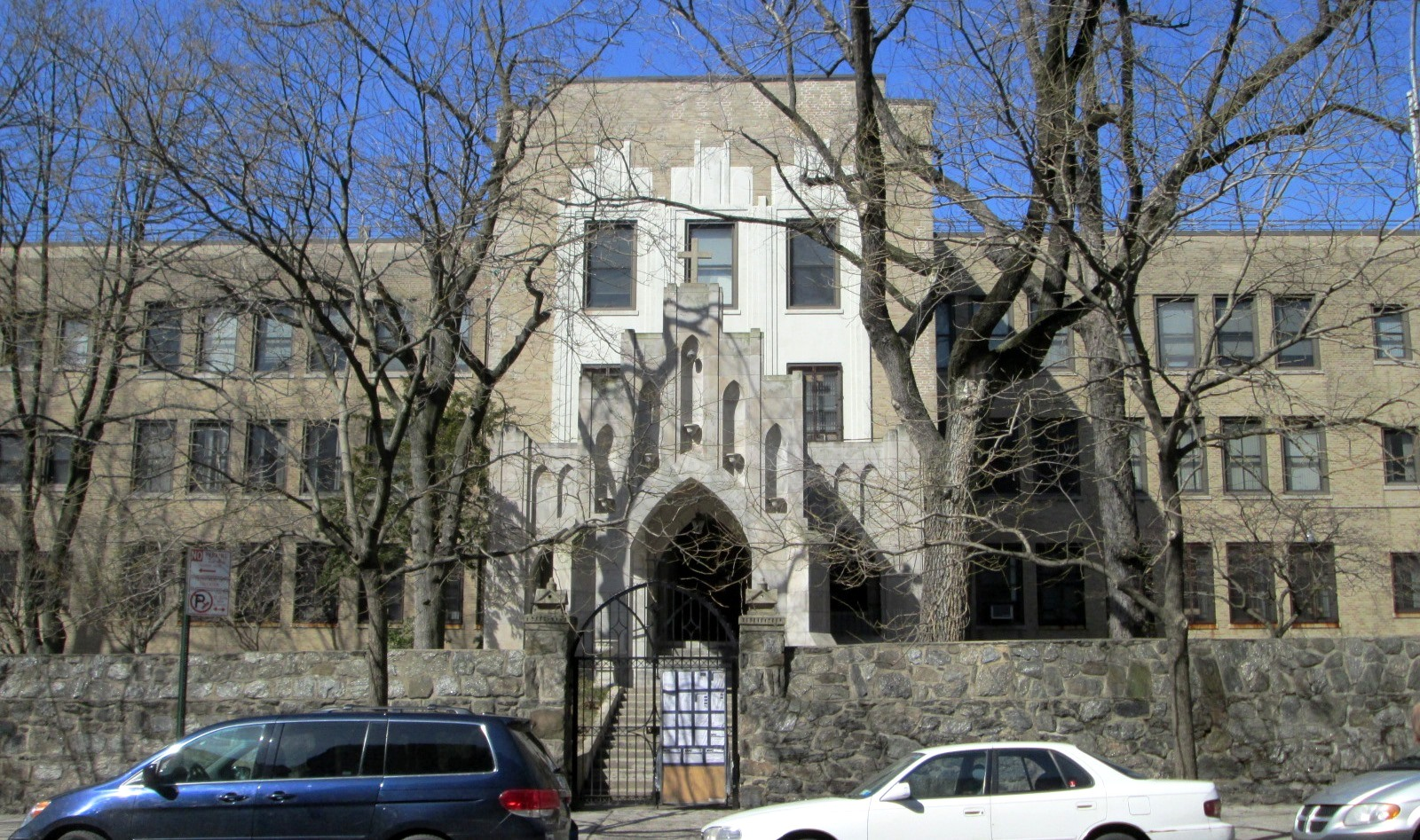
- (2013)

Location
- 701 Fort Washington Avenue; Manhattan, New York City, New York 10040; United States

Information
- Type: Parochial, All-Female
- Religious affiliation: Roman Catholic
- Patron saint: St. Frances Xavier Cabrini
- Established: 1899
- Closed: 2014
- Grades: 9–12
- Colors: Blue and Gold
- Slogan: Educating the Mind, Character, Heart, and Soul since 1899
- Sports: Varsity Basketball, Varsity Volleyball, Varsity Softball
- Accreditation: Middle States Association of Colleges and Schools
- Tuition: $6,490 (planned for 2014–2015)
- Website: www.cabrinihs.com (defunct)

Mother Cabrini High School (MCHS) was a Catholic high school located at 701 Fort Washington Avenue between Fort Tryon Park and West 190th Street, with a facade on Cabrini Boulevard, in the Hudson Heights neighborhood of Washington Heights in Upper Manhattan, New York City.

The school was established as "Sacred Heart Villa" in 1899 by Frances Xavier Cabrini (1850–1917) and was sponsored by the Missionary Sisters of the Sacred Heart of Jesus, the order she founded. It offered specialized and distinctive programs of study to enhance the education of its students, all female. The name was changed to Mother Cabrini High School when the current main building opened in 1930.

The school drew its students from "all over New York City and Westchester, with a large concentration of students from Manhattan and the Bronx." Through much of its history, the student body was largely the children of Irish and Italian immigrants, but by the time of its closure in 2014, the school was predominantly Latino, primarily from the Dominican Republic.

In January 2014, the school announced that it would close at the end of the school year.

From 1933 to 1959, the body of Mother Cabrini laid in repose in the school's chapel, until it was moved to the Cabrini Shrine that was built next to the high school.

== Awards and recognition ==
Mother Cabrini High School was twice recognized with the Blue Ribbon School Award of Excellence by the United States Department of Education, the highest award an American school can receive.

== Closure ==
On January 14, 2014, the Board of Trustees of the school announced on the school website that Mother Cabrini High School would close at the end of the school year, due to "increased costs and diminishing revenue." A post on the website elaborated, saying that the school's deficit had reached "unsustainable levels", despite a projected increase in enrollment and rental income. The deficit was blamed on:

the economic downturn of the past five years ... declining enrollment, managing the growing maintenance expenses of an aging facility, absorbing the cost of unfunded scholarships and tuition assistance, confronting the rising cost of insurance, compensating for the financial vacuum created by the withdrawal of federal grants, and coping with the expanding price tag of running a school and its programs...

Some of the school's alumni and parents of current students said they would try to save the school, but the Board believed that the deficit was insurmountable.

Cabrini was the second Catholic school to close in two years in the Washington Heights/Inwood area, after St. Jude School. Four other Catholic schools remained in the area.

In April 2014 it was announced that Success Academy Charter Schools, a charter school operator with 22 locations in the city, would open a school in the Mother Cabrini High School building for the 2014–2015 school year.
