= St. Frances Xavier Cabrini Shrine =

Shrine in Upper Manhattan, New York City

Coordinates: 40°51′30″N 73°56′7″W

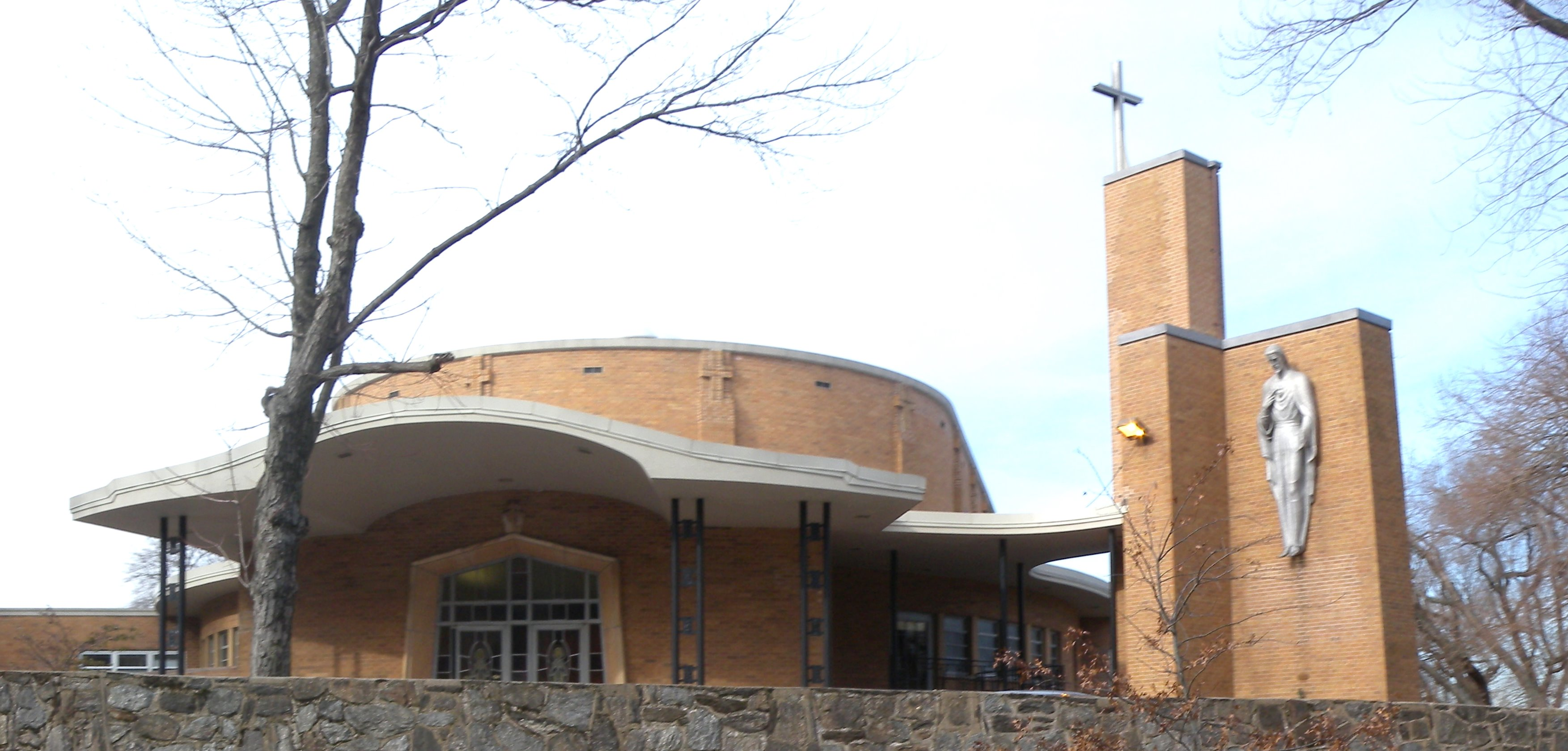
The shrine viewed from Fort Washington Avenue (2010)

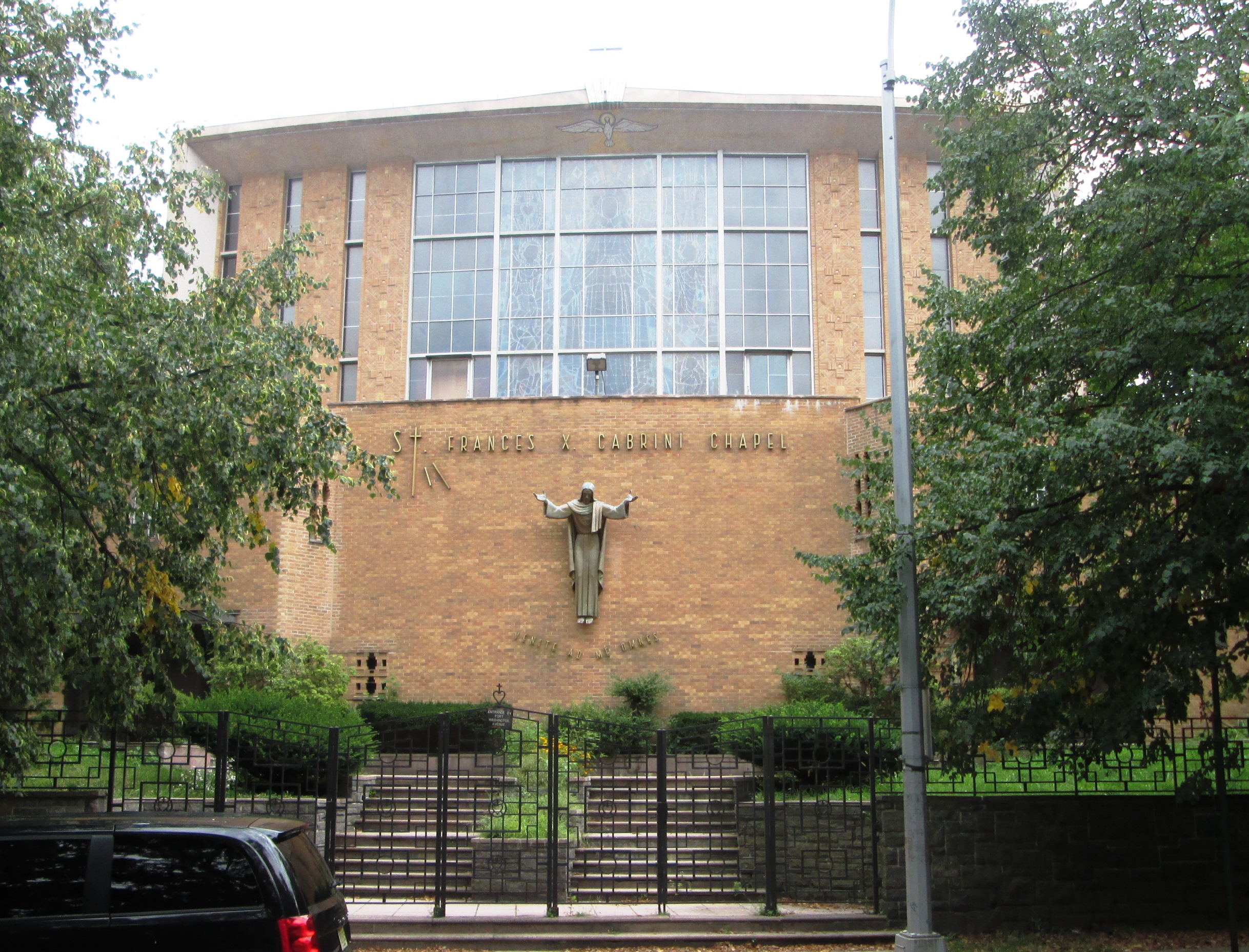
The shrine's facade on Cabrini Boulevard (2013)

The St. Frances Xavier Cabrini Shrine is located at 701 Fort Washington Avenue between Fort Tryon Park and West 190th Street, with a facade on Cabrini Boulevard, in the Hudson Heights neighborhood of Washington Heights in Upper Manhattan, New York City. It is dedicated to Saint Frances Xavier Cabrini (Mother Cabrini, 1850–1917), who in 1946 became the first American citizen to be canonized by the Roman Catholic Church.

In 1933, as Mother Cabrini's cause for sainthood accelerated, her body was exhumed from a rural grave and transferred to the chapel of Manhattan's Mother Cabrini High School, now the Success Academy Washington Heights elementary school. In 1959, the body was transferred again to the current shrine, built adjoining the school in 1957–1960 to accommodate larger numbers of pilgrims. She rests in a bronze-and-glass reliquary casket in the shrine's altar, covered with her religious habit and a sculpted face mask and hands for more lifelike viewing. (A widely quoted New York Times article in 1999 misreported that "her remains are kept in a bronze urn nearby", but the newspaper published a more accurate description in 2015.)

The shrine was designed by the architectural firm of Fabian Zaccone as a horizontal parabolic arch. It includes prominent stained glass and a bright mosaic mural depicting Cabrini's life, and personal mementos including her horse carriage.

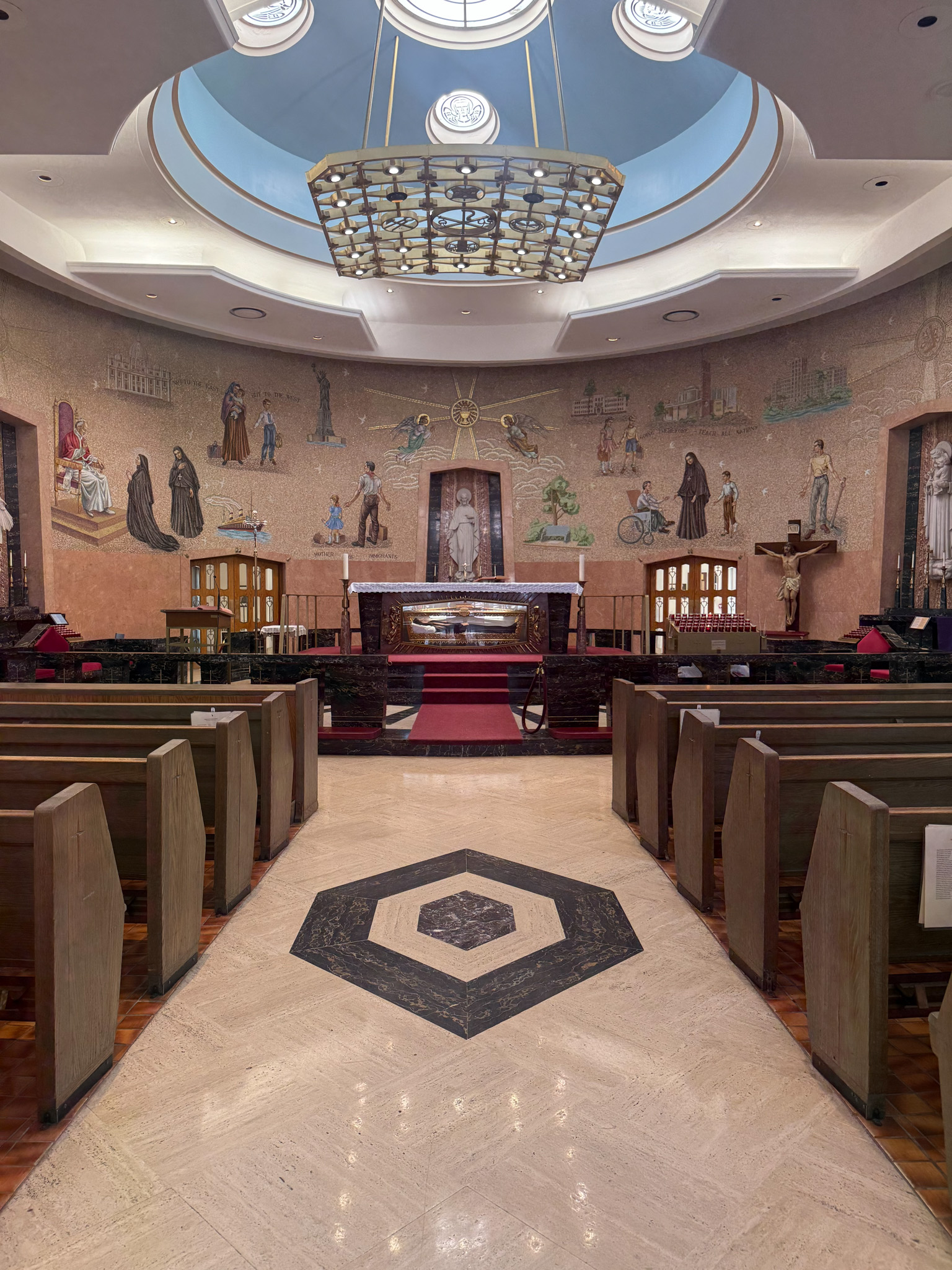
Interior of St. Frances Cabrini Shrine

The shrine is home to a pipe organ built by the Tamburini Organ Company of Crema, Lombardy, which features 2 manuals, 27 stops, 29 ranks, and 1,747 pipes. This and a similar organ in Chicago's Cabrini shrine are rare instruments in the United States by this noted Italian organbuilder from the region of Cabrini's birth.

The street to the west of the New York shrine was renamed Cabrini Boulevard in honor of her beatification in 1938, and the adjacent section of Fort Tryon Park was designated the "Cabrini Woods Nature Sanctuary" after improvements in 2015–2016.

== See also ==
- Mother Cabrini Shrine (Golden, Colorado)
- National Shrine of Saint Francis Xavier Cabrini (Chicago, Illinois)
- Roman Catholic Archdiocese of New York § Major shrines
- List of shrines § United States
