= Missionary Sisters of the Sacred Heart of Jesus =

Roman Catholic female religious congregation

Institute of Missionary Sisters of the Sacred Heart of Jesus
- Abbreviation: M.S.C.
- Formation: 1880; 146 years ago
- Founder: Saint Frances Xavier Cabrini
- Type: Centralized Religious Institute of Consecrated Life of Pontifical Right (for Women)
- Headquarters: Viale Cortina d'Ampezzo, 269, 00135 Roma, Italy
- Members: 273 (2017)
- Superior General: Sr. Barbara Luise Staley
- Website: www.cabriniworld.org

The Missionary Sisters of the Sacred Heart of Jesus is a Catholic female religious congregation founded in 1880 by Saint Frances Xavier Cabrini. Their aim is to spread devotion to the Sacred Heart by means of spiritual and corporal works of mercy.

The sisters conduct homes for the aged and the sick, orphanages, industrial schools, sewing classes; they visit hospitals and prisons, and give religious instruction in their convents, which are open to women desirous of making retreats. The congregation operates in 15 countries on 6 continents, coordinated by its motherhouse in Rome.

== History ==
Maria Francesca Cabrini was born on July 15, 1850, in what is now the Italian Province of Lodi, and began her career as a school teacher. Around 1870, she became headmistress of the orphanage in Codogno, where she taught and drew a small community of women to live a religious way of life. Cabrini took religious vows in 1877 and added Xavier (Saverio) to her name to honor the Jesuit saint, Francis Xavier, the patron saint of missionary service.

When the orphanage closed in 1880, Cabrini and seven other women who had taken religious vows with her founded the Missionary Sisters of the Sacred Heart of Jesus (M.S.C.). She wrote the Rule and Constitutions of the religious institute, and she continued as its superior general until her death. The sisters took in orphans and foundlings, opened a day school to help pay expenses, started classes in needlework and sold their fine embroidery to earn a little more money. The institute established seven homes and a free school and nursery in its first five years. Its good works brought Cabrini to the attention of Giovanni Scalabrini, Bishop of Piacenza, and of Pope Leo XIII.

In 1889, at the suggestion of Pope Leo XIII, the sisters came to New York, and opened convents in the archdioceses of Chicago, Denver, Newark, Seattle, and Los Angeles and the dioceses of Brooklyn and Scranton. In 1892 they established Columbus Hospital in New York City, which later became Cabrini Medical Center and operated until 2008.

From 1926 to 1951, several Italian sisters coming from the United States were active in China, provinces of Henan and Zhejiang.

The sisters purchased the former Woodcrest estate in Radnor Township, Pennsylvania in 1953. Cabrini University opened on the estate in September 1957.

== Present day ==
The Missionary Sisters of the Sacred Heart of Jesus are present in 15 countries on 6 continents. The general motherhouse is in Rome. The Missionary Sisters' current missions include service in the areas of education, healthcare and immigration. In London, they run the St Francesca Cabrini Catholic Primary School.
