= Marcelline Vigano =

- Mother Marcelline
- Born: 6 January 1869; Brugherio
- Died: 7 June 1942 (aged 73); Rome
- Other names: Mother Marcelline
- Known for: expanding the Apostles of the Sacred Heart of Jesus
- Predecessor: Clelia Merloni
- Successor: Hildegarde Campodonico

Marcelline Vigano or Mother Marcelline (6 January 1869 – 7 June 1942) was an Italian nun who became a Superior General who expanded Apostles of the Sacred Heart of Jesus after the founder was removed by the Roman Catholic church.

== Life ==
Vigano was born in Brugherio in 1869 and she committed to the life of a nun in 1895 in Viareggio. She joined the newly formed order of the Congregation of the Apostles of the Sacred Heart of Jesus which had been started by Mother Clelia Merloni in 1894. Vigano was soon the founder's vicaress.

In 1908 she helped to extend the reach of the "Congregation of the Apostles of the Sacred Heart of Jesus" when she was sent to America to assist new organisations which the church calls apostolates. Whilst she was there she created a building or novitiate where novice nuns could be trained. Whilst she was in America the movement's founder suffered from false accusations. The movement had become a target for slander and the Merloni had been forced into hiding. The nuns gained some protection from Bishop Giovanni Battista Scalabrini who had founded a mission to send missionaries to America. Unfortunately the bishop died in 1905 and the nuns headquarters were moved to Alessandria in Piedmont. In 1911 the church removed the founder from office.

She became the Superior General of the Congregation after she was recalled to Italy. Four years later the organisation was renamed the Zelatrices of the Sacred Heart of Jesus which was a sign of growing acceptance by the church.

Vigaro travelled a good deal around Italy visiting the organisation's houses, but she also travelled to the Americas four times between 1908 and 1931. Vigaro also visited islands in the Aegean sea. Within Italy she created new headquarters in Rome in 1916 and a northern outpost near her birthplace at the region of Milan called Comasina.

In 1928 she was able to welcome the founder back into the sisterhood and she was able to live with them until she died in 1930. Four months after the founder died the Pope gave a final recognition of their work and a definitive approbation. Vigaro retired in 1937 and then stayed on to assist her successor, Hildegarde Campodonico, until Vigano died in Rome in 1942.

In 2011 on the 150th anniversary of the founder's birth the Pope praised the work of the Apostles of the Sacred Heart of Jesus.
