= Giuseppe Marchetti =

Giuseppe Marchetti may refer to:

- Giuseppe Marchetti (priest)
- Giuseppe Marchetti (critic)
