= Teresa Grillo Michel =

Italian Roman Catholic nun

Blessed Teresa Grillo Michel
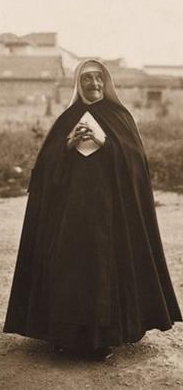
- Michel later in life.

Religious
- Born: 25 September 1855; Spinetta Marengo, Kingdom of Sardinia
- Died: 25 January 1944 (aged 88); Alessandria, Italian Social Republic
- Venerated in: Roman Catholic Church
- Beatified: 24 May 1998, Piazza Vittorio Veneto, Turin, Italy by Pope John Paul II
- Feast: 25 January; 23 January (Alessandria)
- Attributes: Religious habit
- Patronage: Little Sisters of Divine Providence

Teresa Grillo Michel (born Teresa Grillo; 25 September 1855 – 25 January 1944), also known by her religious name Maria Antonia, was an Italian Roman Catholic nun and the founder of the Little Sisters of Divine Providence. Grillo was a widow who also part of the Third Order of Saint Francis; she entered the religious life following the death of her husband. Grillo studied in Turin and Lodi before returning to her hometown Alessandria where she married. But her husband died sometime later leaving her in a deep depression that came a call to help the poor. Grillo founded a religious congregation that would expand into Latin America and she would also maintain contact with important individuals such as Luigi Orione and Clelia Merloni both of whom she befriended.

Her beatification was celebrated in Turin in mid-1998.

== Life ==
Teresa Grillo was born on 25 September 1855 in Spinetta Marengo (now part of Alessandria) as the last of five children born to Giuseppe Grillo and Maria Antonietta Parvopassau. Her mother came from an aristocratic line while her father was the head doctor at the civil hospital in Alessandria and who died in her childhood in 1867. Her baptism was held on 26 September 1855 and she was baptized as "Maddalena".

Her Confirmation was celebrated in the diocesan cathedral on 1 October 1867 at a Mass that Bishop Giacomo Antonio Colli presided over. Grillo made her First Communion in 1872.

She attended school in Turin (her mother decided to move there since Grillo's older brother Francesco was attending college there) and later enrolled at a boarding school in Lodi on 13 November 1867 (just after her father died) that the Ladies of Loretto managed. It was there that Grillo graduated in 1873 before she returned to Alessandria where she married Captain Giovanni Battista Michel on 2 August 1877 (the couple did not have children). The couple lived first in Caserta before moving to Acireale and Catania. The couple later moved to Portici and their final relocation was to Naples where her husband died during a parade on 13 June 1891 due to sunstroke. Her husband's sudden death caused her to sink into a deep depression that made her ill but it was her priest cousin Prelli who guided her through it. It was around this point that while reading into the life of Giuseppe Benedetto Cottolengo she experienced a sudden conversion in which she resolved to do whatever she could in order to aid the poor. Grillo at first used her own home to shelter the poor but was forced to sell it in 1893 due to the increasing number of poor people seeking shelter. Grillo sold this house despite the opposition of her relations and instead purchased an old building that she remodeled and renamed as the Little Shelter of Divine Providence. In due course other women became attracted to this work and rallied to her side. These women helped become the basis for the religious congregation that Grillo founded on 8 January 1899 with the permission of the Bishop of Alessandria Giuseppe Capecci (she had written her order's first Rule in 1898). Her mother died in 1899.

Grillo later entered the Third Order of Saint Francis on 14 January 1893 and around that time donated her wedding garment to the Capuchin church in Alessandria to be used as a sacred vestment. Grillo made her profession as a Franciscan third order member on 23 January 1894. In 1902 she and six other sisters visited La Spezia where the group founded both a kindergarten and sewing workshop. Grillo made her initial profession in Brazil on 6 October 1901 during her first visit there and then made her full profession in Alessandrina on 3 November 1905.

Her order spread outside Italian cities to Brazil first on 13 June 1900 and she made her first visit to Brazil in 1901 and again in 1903 to São Paulo. Grillo visited Brazil again in 1906 and again in 1914 while in 1909 was present in Messina for the earthquake. Grillo departed for Brazil once again on 7 January 1920. The order later spread in 1928 to Argentina after Luigi Orione - whom she befriended - asked in 1927 for it go move there. The religious did this and so in 1928 visited Argentina and made her last visit to Brazil at the same time. Grillo visited Latin America six times with her final visit to the continent being in 1928. Her order received the decree of praise for her order from Pope Pius XI on 5 July 1935 and later full pontifical approval from Pope Pius XII on 8 June 1942. The first General Chapter for the order was held on 10 June 1936 in which Grillo was confirmed as the order's Superior General. Grillo also knew and befriended Clelia Merloni; she supported her initiatives and encouraged Merloni after the latter was ousted from her own religious order. The two would meet whenever Grillo was in Rome.

Grillo died at her order's motherhouse in Alessandria in 1944.

== Beatification ==
The beatification process for the late religious opened in the Alessandria diocese in an informative process that investigated her life and reputation for holiness from 16 April 1953 until 25 September 1959; the beginning of the cause saw her named a Servant of God. Theologians assessed her writings and on 6 July 1963 signed a decree recognizing that Grillo's spiritual writings contained no doctrinal errors that would otherwise impede the beatification process. The second investigation - an apostolic process - was held from 1974 to 1976 to compile further information on Grillo's life which later allowed for the Congregation for the Causes of Saints on 20 October 1977 to issue a decree validating these processes as having complied with their regulations for conducting causes.

The postulation later submitted the official Positio dossier in 1981 which was an accumulation of all documentation and witness interrogatories in relation to Grillo's life and reputation for holiness. Theologians confirmed the cause on 1 April 1985 as did the cardinal and bishop members comprising the C.C.S. on 4 June 1985. Grillo became titled as Venerable on 6 July 1985 after Pope John Paul II confirmed that Grillo led a life of heroic virtue according to the cardinal and theological virtues.

Her beatification would depend upon the papal confirmation of a healing deemed to be miraculous in nature. For that to be the case the healing had to come as a result of Grillo's intercession and would have to be a case lacking scientific and medical explanations. One such case was investigated and the C.C.S. validated that investigation on 30 October 1987. Medical experts (not all being Catholic themselves) confirmed that there was no possible scientific or medical explanation to the healing presented to them while theologians on 14 November 1997 determined the healing came after requesting Grillo's intercession. This led the C.C.S. members to deem the case a miracle at their meeting on 2 December 1997; the pope signed a decree on 18 December confirming this and would therefore allow for Grillo to be beatified.

John Paul II beatified Grillo in mid-1998 in Turin while on his visit there.
