= ASCJ =

ASCJ may stand for:

- Amalgamated Society of Carpenters and Joiners, former British trade union
- Apostles of the Sacred Heart of Jesus, Catholic women's religious organisation
