= San Carlo, Piacenza =

Roman Catholic church and monastery in Piacenza, Italy

Coordinates: 45°02′51″N 9°42′01″E

San Carlo is a Baroque style, Roman Catholic church and monastery, located in Piacenza, Italy. The church was dedicated to San Carlo Borromeo.

The church was built in 17th-century and the adjacent building became a convent for a Capuchin order of nuns. The nuns were expelled in 1810, but in the late 19th century, the church passed to the missionary order established by the former bishop of the town, Giovanni Battista Scalabrini (died 1905). The church and the monastery were reconstructed in the second half of the twentieth century, altering the two cloisters.

The church contains a venerated statue of the Child Jesus originally from the Church of San Gervasio.
