= Giulia Valle =

Blessed Giulia Valle SCSJA
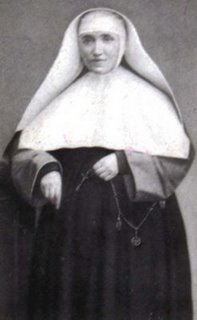
- Sister Nemesia

Religious
- Born: 26 June 1847; Aosta, Kingdom of Sardinia
- Died: 18 December 1916 (aged 69); Borgaro Torinese, Turin, Kingdom of Italy
- Venerated in: Roman Catholic Church
- Beatified: 25 April 2004, Saint Peter's Square, Vatican City by Pope John Paul II
- Feast: 18 December
- Attributes: Religious habit; Crucifix; Rosary
- Patronage: Educators

Giulia Valle, SCSJA (26 June 1847 – 18 December 1916) was an Italian Catholic nun and a professed member of the Sisters of Charity of Saint Joan Antida Thouret. She assumed the religious name of Nemesia. Following her profession, she became an educator in Turin and the surrounding areas and was known for her careful attention to people's individual educational needs.

Valle died of pneumonia in 1916 and was beatified on 25 April 2004.

== Life ==
Giulia Valle was born in Aosta on 26 June 1847 to Anselmo Valle and Cristina Dalbar; she was the oldest sibling of Vincenzo however her parents had lost two sons before her birth. Valle was baptized hours after her birth in the Church of Saint Orso in the names of Maddalena Teresa Giulia. She worked in her parents' milliner shop during her childhood.

Her mother died when she was four in 1851 and she was sent to live with paternal relatives in Aosta (her grandfather and an unmarried aunt) and then with maternal relations in Donnas. Valle prepared for the sacraments at the home of a priest who was a close friend of her relatives. She was sent to France at the age of eleven in 1858 where she studied in Besançon with the Sisters of Charity of Saint Joan Antida Thouret where she learnt to master the French language and the piano. Valle also studied the texts of Vincent de Paul and Francis de Sales; she finished and left in 1863 to return to her father. Her father later remarried and moved to Pont-Saint-Martin and Valle – not welcome in their home due to issues with her father's new wife – went back to her relations. However relations with them became strained over time and even led to the estrangement between Valle and her brother.

Valle felt a strong call to religious life and when her father had begun to arrange a marriage for her it forced her hand. As a result of this she decided once and for all that she would go down the path of a religious and so began her novitiate at the Convent of Santa Margherita in Vercelli on 8 September 1866; her father accompanied her there. Valle obtained her teaching qualification on 29 September 1867 and made her vows at that same time; she received her master's degree in November. She assumed the religious name of "Nemesia" upon her solemn profession on 15 October 1873. After her profession, she was sent to the Institute of Saint Vincent in 1866 at Tortona and taught general studies to children and the French language at the high school level. She also worked in the local orphanage and was made the Superior of her house in 1887. As a nun she continued to remind herself: "Concentrate on the one goal: God alone!"

She aided Luigi Orione and also provided shelter to Teresa Grillo Michel and was later assigned as the Mistress of Novices at Borgaro Torinese and spent the remainder of her life there where she led 500 new sisters into religious life. During the cholera epidemic of 1890 she opened the doors of the institute in order to tend to the ill; in 1901 she recovered from a slight illness. On the morning of 10 May 1903 she left a message prior to her departure from Tortona: "I am leaving happily ... I entrust to Our Lady ... I shall follow you in every moment of the day". She left at 4:00 am for Borgaro Torinese for her new task.

In the autumn of 1916 her health took a sharp pitfall and declined to the point where on 11 December she contracted severe pneumonia. She died a week later on 18 December 1916 at 9:10 pm; the room filled with a sweet perfume of roses and violets when she died. She was buried in the church of the institute in Borgario Torinese.

== Beatification ==
The beatification process commenced with an archdiocesan process in Turin after the Congregation for the Causes of Saints granted their approval to the initiation of the cause on 31 July 1981. The beginning of the process granted her the posthumous title of Servant of God – the first stage in the process – and saw the completion of two processes that were tasked with investigating her life and works.

Upon the completion of both processes the postulation compiled the Positio – a large dossier consisting of biographical details attesting to the pros of her cause – in 1994 and submitted it to Rome for their own investigation. A historical commission was called in to ensure that there would be no barriers to the cause proceeding and granted the cause its approval. This culminated on 5 July 2002 when Pope John Paul II proclaimed her to be Venerable upon acknowledging that Valle had indeed lived a model Christian life of heroic virtue.

The miracle needed for her beatification was investigated in its diocese of origin and received full ratification from Rome in 1997 before proceeding to a set of other stages needed for the investigation. The pope himself approved the healing as a miracle on 20 December 2003 and beatified Valle on 25 April 2004.

The current postulator assigned to the cause is Sister Anna Antida Casolino.
