= Giuseppe Marchetti (priest) =

Brazilian religious priest and Venerable

Venerable Giuseppe Marchetti CS
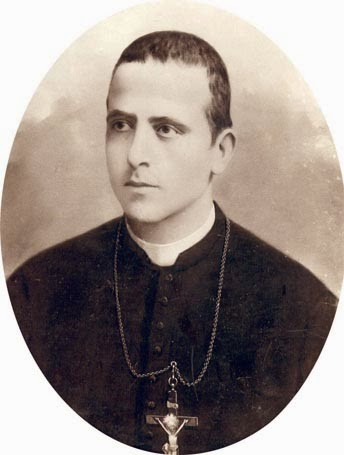
- Born: 3 October 1869; Lombrici di Camaiore, Lucca, Kingdom of Italy
- Died: 14 December 1896 (aged 27); São Paulo, Brazil

Giuseppe Marchetti, CS (3 October 1869 – 14 December 1896) was an Italian Catholic religious priest of the Missionaries of St. Charles Borromeo and the co-founder of the Sisters Missionaries of Saint Charles Borromeo.

Marchetti served first as a local pastor after his ordination but decided to later help Giovanni Battista Scalabrini in his mission to tend to and support Italian emigrants. He started to take trips to Brazil to focus on Italians relocating there and later moved there to found an orphanage and to work alongside abandoned children and emigrants. He also invited his sister, Assunta Marchetti, to help him in his work and she would continue his mission for the four decades after his death. She herself would become beatified, as a Blessed Mother.

The process for his beatification started its initial planning phase in the mid-1990s that resulted in a formal process activating and allowing for Marchetti to be titled as a Servant of God. He later became titled as venerable in mid-2016 after Pope Francis acknowledged that Marchetti had lived a life of heroic virtue.

== Life ==
Giuseppe Marchetti was born on 3 October 1869 in Lombrici di Camaiore in the Lucca province as the second of eleven children to Angelo Marchetti (17 October 1846 – 26 April 1893) and Carola Ghilarducci (13 December 1850-22 February 1927). In 1880 the Marchetti's relocated to Mulino di Camaiore so that his father could begin working as a miller, though he later died from pneumonia.

In his childhood Marchetti liked reading the Psalms in the Bible and also was known for having read and liked The Imitation of Christ which he kept with him at most times. He distinguished himself in his ecclesial studies and later received his ordination to the priesthood on 3 April 1892 from the Archbishop of Lucca Nicola Ghilardi, before being appointed as the pastor for Compignano di Massarosa; he was first assigned to teach French to seminarians but this task was made brief so that he could begin pastoral work. He carried out his duties there as a pastor until he attended a conference in whichGiovanni Battista Scalabrini (the Bishop of Piacenza) spoke about Italian emigrants who were moving abroad. He decided from that point that he would collaborate with Scalabrini and the two set to work on how best to guide and support Italian emigrants. He often accompanied immigrants to the port in Genova to see them off, but decided that it was not enough to help them. Marchetti decided to focus on Brazil while Scalabrini – despite his own pastoral obligations in Piacenza – would focus on the United States. He undertook his first trip to Brazil from the Genova port on 15 October 1894, that lasted until December, and would later make a second trip in 1895 (serving as a chaplain on both trips) that confirmed to him the need to move to Brazil to better respond to his mission. That second trip saw a mother die aboard the ship "Julius Caesar" leaving her months-old daughter and husband. This episode proved to Marchetti the need to expand his care for both emigrants and children. It was after he arrived at São Paulo that he oversaw the establishment of an orphanage for the protection of abandoned children in 1895.

Marchetti also invited his sister Assunta in 1895 to help him in his mission in Brazil and he would also go on to co-found alongside her the Scalabrinian Sisters. His sister would arrive in Brazil alongside their mother and two others, though their mother returned to their homeland in 1897. He later made his religious profession on 25 October 1895 in Piacenza into the hands of Scalabrini in the presence of his sister.

Marchetti died on 14 December 1896 in São Paulo after having contracted typhoid fever as he tended to an ill woman on her deathbed, whose confession he went to go and hear. His remains are buried in São Paulo.

== Beatification process ==
The centennial commemorating his death prompted the Scalabrinian Superior General Father Luigi Favero and the superior of the Scalabrinian Sisters Lice Maria Signor on 24 June 1996 to send word to their respective orders of their intention to pursue a beatification cause for Marchetti. The Congregation for the Causes of Saints issued the nihil obstat ("no objections") on 7 December 1999 and titled Marchetti as a Servant of God. The diocesan process was launched in the São Paulo archdiocese on 5 May 2000 and was later closed on 28 November 2001 before the Congregation validated the diocesan process on 21 February 2003.

The positio dossier was submitted in 2008. It first went to six historians on 22 January 2008 with five out of six issuing their approval which enabled the cause to move forward. Six of eight theologians (those absent issued a written vote) met on 13 October 2015 but there was the unanimous conclusion that clarifications were needed before casting a definitive vote; these clarifications enabled for a unanimous agreement later on 21 January 2016. The cardinal and bishops of the Congregation also issued their assent to the cause on 8 July 2016. Marchetti became titled as Venerable on 8 July 2016 after Pope Francis issued a decree that acknowledged that Marchetti had practiced heroic virtue throughout his life.

The postulator for the cause (since October 1996) is Ennio Guglielmo Bellinato CS and the current vice-postulator is Leocadia Mezzomo from the Scalabrinian Sisters. The first vice-postulator that had been assigned to the cause (from 2 February 1997) was Blandina Felippelli (also from the Scalabrinian Sisters) and the second had been Sisto Caccia CS (from 10 May 2002).
