= Assunta Marchetti =

Italian Roman Catholic religious sister

Blessed Assunta Marchetti SS
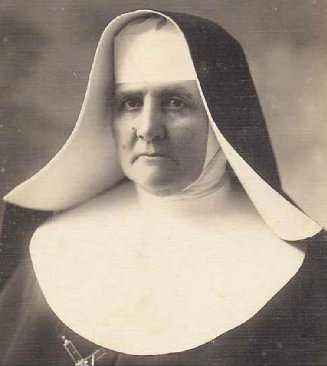
- Born: 15 August 1871; Lombrici di Camaiore, Lucca, Kingdom of Italy
- Died: 1 July 1948 (aged 76); São Paulo, Brazil
- Venerated in: Roman Catholic Church
- Beatified: 25 October 2014, São Paulo Cathedral, Brazil by Cardinal Angelo Amato
- Feast: 1 July

Assunta Marchetti, SS (15 August 1871 – 1 July 1948) was an Italian Catholic who cofounded of the Missionary Sisters of Saint Charles Borromeo. She worked in Brazil from 1895 until her death.

Her priest brother Giuseppe is titled as Venerable on the path to sainthood. Her beatification was celebrated on 25 October 2014; Cardinal Angelo Amato presided over the beatification on the behalf of Pope Francis.

== Life ==
Maria Assunta Caterina Marchetti was born on 15 August 1871 to Angelo Marchetti (1846-93) and Carola Ghilarducci as the third of eleven children; she received her baptism on 16 August. In 1880 they relocated to Mulino di Camaiore where her father commenced work as a miller. Marchetti received her Confirmation in 1883 and made her First Communion at the same time. Her aunt Caterina was an influence for her religious formation.

Marchetti led a pious life as a child but suffered hardships with a frail mother and the premature death of her father from pneumonia in 1893 and she had to help her mother and halt pursuing her dream to enter the Carmelites. The girl later met Giovanni Battista Scalabrini and made vows as a nun into his hands on 25 October 1895 in Piacenza with her widowed mother and two companions Angela Larini and Maria Francheschini. In 1895 her priest brother Giuseppe invited her to work with him abroad in Brazil to cater to the orphans of Italian immigrants. Marchetti accepted the invitation and travelled there alongside her mother and two companions (Larini and Francheschini) setting off from Genoa on 26 October 1895. Both she and her priest brother later co-founded the Missionaries of Saint Charles Borromeo - or the Scalabrinian Sisters - not long after their arrival. Her mother later left Brazil back for her homeland to tend to her children in 1897. In October 1897 she made her perpetual profession to Father Faustino Consoni. She collaborated with Scalabrini in 1904 when he visited Brazil for a month not long before the latter died.

Marchetti was hospitalized in 1947 and was treated for varicose veins and erysipelas. Marchetti's condition deteriorated over the next several months and she later died in 1948 at 3:15 with two priests and others present at her bedside.

== Beatification ==
The beatification process started under Pope John Paul II on 24 January 1987 and as such she became titled as a Servant of God; Cardinal Paulo Evaristo Arns inaugurated the diocesan process in São Paulo on 12 June 1987 and later concluded it on 25 October 1991; the Congregation for the Causes of Saints validated this process on 17 December 1993 and received the Positio from the postulation in 2004. Theologians approved the cause's merits on 17 September 2010 as did the C.C.S. on 18 October 2011. The confirmation of her life of heroic virtue on 19 December 2011 allowed for Pope Benedict XVI to title her as Venerable.

The process for investigating a miracle took place in Porto Alegre from 7 April 1999 until 20 July 2000 prior to the C.C.S. validating this process on 16 November 2001. Medical experts approved this healing as a miracle on 9 February 2012 as did theologians on 14 February 2013 and the C.C.S. on 24 September 2013. Pope Francis approved this miracle on 9 October 2013 and the beatification date was confirmed on 17 December 2013.

Cardinal Angelo Amato presided over the beatification on the pope's behalf on 25 October 2014. The miracle was the permanent cure in 1994 of Heraclides Teixeira Filho of heart disease and other related ailments.

The current postulator for this cause is Sister Leocadia Mezzomo.
