= Luigi Arzuffi =

Italian painter and sculptor (1931–1995)

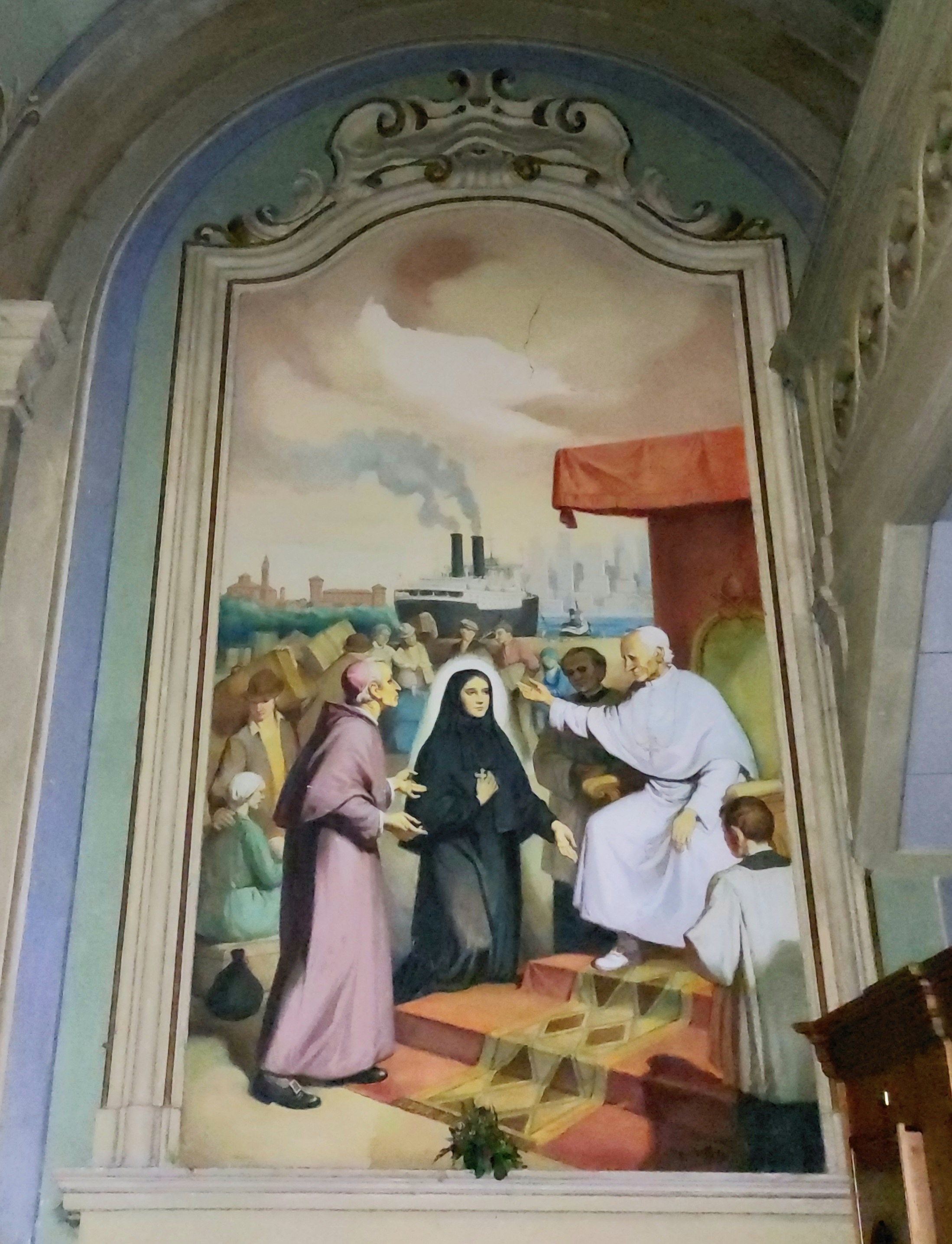
- Fresco by Arzuffi (1984), representing mother Cabrini, who, accompanied by bishop Scalabrini, receives from pope Leo XIII the charge of missionary in the United States (Parish Church of Caselle Landi, Italy).
- Born: 2 August 1931; Bergamo, Kingdom of Italy
- Died: 12 February 1995 (aged 63); Bergamo, Italy
- Notable work: Mother Cabrini leaves for the Americas (1984)

Luigi Arzuffi (2 August 1931 – 12 February 1995) was an Italian artist. He was the son of the painter Pasquale Arzuffi.

== Biography ==
He was born on 2 August 1931. He stated that since childhood, he had a natural talent for the fine arts. In 1947, he enrolled at the Accademia Carrara in Bergamo and collaborated with his father on many works performed in the Bergamo area.

After he married, he opened his workshop, dedicating himself mainly to fresco work in religious buildings. He created, among others, the Madonna embedded in the church of San Lorenzo in Bergamo and the Via Crucis of Comenduno di Albino.

He was active in other locations as well, creating frescoes in the churches of Rezzoaglio, Salsominore of Piacenza, the Crowned Christ in the parish church of Vigliano d'Asti, Rimini (Jacob's Dream in the church of the Madonna della Scala), Desenzano del Garda (Hospital church), Casaletto, Guardamiglio, Fombio, the dome of Albiate and the parish church of Caselle Landi.

He also dealt with restoration, as in the case of the Orio al Serio airport chapel and the parish church of Lainate. The artistic tradition of the Arzuffi family continues with Luigi's son Marcello.

Arzuffi died on 12 February 1995 in Bergamo.

== Bibliography ==
- Amanzio Possenti, Luigi Arzuffi ed il padre Pasquale, Bergamo, Grafica & Arte, 1995, ISBN 88-7201-175-2.
- Luigi Pagnoni, Le chiese parrocchiali della Diocesi di Bergamo, Bergamo, Il Conventino, 1974.
