= Tommaso Reggio =

Italian Roman Catholic prelate

Blessed Tommaso Reggio
- Archbishop of Genoa
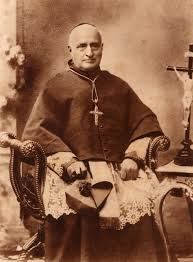
- Photograph taken between 1887 and 1901.
- Church: Roman Catholic Church
- Archdiocese: Genoa
- Metropolis: Genoa
- See: Genoa
- Appointed: 11 July 1892
- Installed: 10 August 1892
- Term ended: 22 November 1901
- Predecessor: Salvatore Magnasco
- Successor: Eduardo Pulciano
- Previous posts: Titular Bishop of Tanis (1877); Coadjutor Bishop of Ventimiglia (1877); Bishop of Ventimiglia (1877-1892); Apostolic Administrator of Chiavari (1892-1894)

Orders
- Ordination: 18 September 1841 by Placido Maria Tadini
- Consecration: 6 May 1877 by Salvatore Magnasco
- Rank: Archbishop

Personal details
- Born: Tommaso Reggio; 9 January 1818 Genoa, Kingdom of Sardinia
- Died: 22 November 1901 (aged 83) Triora, Imperia, Kingdom of Italy

Sainthood
- Feast day: 9 January
- Venerated in: Roman Catholic Church
- Beatified: 3 September 2000; Saint Peter's Square, Vatican City by Pope John Paul II
- Attributes: Episcopal attire

Ordination history of Tommaso Reggio
History
Priestly ordination
- Ordained by: Placido Maria Tadini
Episcopal consecration
- Principal consecrator: Salvatore Magnasco
- Co-consecrators: Giovanni Battista Cerruti & Giuseppe Maria Sciandra
Episcopal succession
Bishops consecrated by Tommaso Reggio as principal consecrator
- Fortunato Vinelli: 12 March 1893
- Giovanni Carli: 21 May 1898
- Disma Marchese: 23 June 1901

Tommaso Reggio (9 January 1818 - 22 November 1901) was an Italian Roman Catholic prelate who served as the Archbishop of Genoa from 1892 until his death. He was also the founder of the Sisters of Saint Martha. Reggio distinguished himself during an earthquake that struck his diocese in 1887. He tended to the injured in the rubble and led initiatives to direct diocesan resources towards the displaced and the injured; while in Genoa he collaborated with Bishop Giovanni Battista Scalabrini in tending to immigrants through a range of different pastoral initiatives.

Reggio's cause for sainthood opened in 1983 though initiatives had been made prior to this to collect documents in relation to his life and episcopal tenure; he was named as Venerable in 1997 and the miraculous cure of a Chilean girl led to his beatification in Saint Peter's Square on 3 September 2000.

== Life ==
=== Education and priesthood ===
Tommaso Reggio was born in Genoa on 9 January 1818 to Marquis Giovanni Giacomo Reggio and Angela Maria Pareto; he was baptized on 10 January in the archdiocesan cathedral of San Lorenzo. He made his First Communion and received his Confirmation on 10 April 1828 from the Bishop of Saluzzo Antonio Podestà.

Reggio received his initial education at home from a private teacher and then his high school education in Genoa from the Somaschi Fathers and on 1 August 1838 received his Bachelor of Law from the Genoa college. On 24 March 1839 he decided to become a priest and underwent his philosophical and theological education in preparation for the priesthood. He received his ordination to the priesthood on 18 September 1841 after the conclusion of his ecclesial studies from Cardinal Placido Maria Tadini; he celebrated his first Mass in Gavi in Alessandria in the church of San Maurizio. On 15 July 1842, he graduated from Genoa College in theological studies and received his doctorate in those studies in 1843. Reggio was appointed in 1843 as the vice-rector of seminarians in Genoa while later serving as the rector of seminarians in Chiavari from 1845 until 1851. In 1851 he returned to Genoa where he served as the abbot of Santa Maria Assunta in Carignano since his appointment as such on 26 May. He helped found The Catholic Standard on 26 July 1849 which was a newspaper but was to later close the paper on 14 March 1874 (with its final issue) after the papal declaration that the faithful could not vote in elections. It also put to rest his hopes - and that of others - for establishing a political organization based on the teachings of the faith.

=== Episcopate ===
He was named as the Bishop of Ventimiglia and as the titular Bishop of Tanis; he received his episcopal consecration in mid-1877. The diocese was so poor to the point that he had to travel on a mule to visit his parishes while making three pastoral visitations to the parishes in 1877, 1882 and 1889 while celebrating the first diocesan synod on 8 March 1880. He founded the Sisters of Saint Martha on 15 October 1878 which he determined was to be a congregation devoted to caring for the poor. He opened new parishes and also organized three diocesan gatherings of bishops and priests and focused on liturgical revival. In addition to this he set up teaching programs across the diocese and began the restorative work of the Genoa Cathedral.

Following an earthquake in 1887 in his diocese he worked with the victims in the rubble and he ordered his priests to use all of their resources to help the displaced peoples. He founded orphanages at Ventimiglia and Sanremo for those children who had lost their families in the quake. This great aid he rendered saw the Italian government award him as a Knight of the Cross of Ss. Maurizio e Lazzaro in 1887. In 1892 he asked Pope Leo XIII to relieve him of his duties but the pope appointed him instead as the Archbishop of Genoa where he was enthroned on 10 August in a grand celebration. He set up a network for immigrants and worked alongside Bishop Giovanni Battista Scalabrini to that end. On 2 April 1892, he ordained August Czartoryski as a priest. He celebrated an archdiocesan synod in 1893. Reggio also presided over the funeral of Umberto I on 8 August 1900 with papal permission to do so.

=== Death ===
Reggio made a pilgrimage on 13 September 1901 to Triora due to the unveiling of a new statue of Jesus Christ on Mount Saccarello with diocesan priests; he could not ascend the mountain due to being struck with a sudden and violent knee pain forcing him to remain in bed. Infection soon settled in and worsened despite dressings and kneepads that failed to help heal him. He died in the afternoon on 22 November 1901 at 2:20pm with his last words being: "God, God, God alone is enough for me". Ambrogio Daffra - his successor in Ventimiglia - said not long after his death: "I have witnessed the death of a saint". His remains were interred in Genoa after the funeral at the cathedral but later relocated in 1951. His order received the papal decree of praise from Pope Pius XI on 13 May 1928 who also granted pontifical approval later on 21 May 1935; in 2008 his order had 527 religious in 63 houses in countries such as Argentina and Lebanon. The first biographical account of his life was published in 1926.

== Beatification ==
The beatification cause opened on 26 May 1983 after the Congregation for the Causes of Saints issued the official "nihil obstat" to the cause and titled Reggio as a Servant of God; Cardinal Giuseppe Siri oversaw the diocesan process of investigation from 1983 until 1984 when all documents were sealed and boxes and sent to the C.C.S. in Rome who validated the process on 23 November 1992. The cause's officials compiled the Positio dossier though submitted it to the C.C.S. in two parts in 1991 and later in 1994 for investigation. Six historians approved the cause on 24 November 1992 as did the nine theologians later on 23 September 1997 in a unanimous decision. Cardinal Giovanni Canestri convened a meeting of the C.C.S. on 2 December 1997 which approved the cause as well. Reggio was named as Venerable on 18 December 1997 after Pope John Paul II confirmed his life of heroic virtue.

Reggio's beatification depended on the approval of a miraculous healing that neither medicine nor science could explain. One such case was investigated in Valparaíso in Chile in 1995 (Jorge Medina oversaw the diocesan process) before all the evidence was sent to the C.C.S. who validated the diocesan investigation on 18 October 1996. The medical panel of experts approved this case on 29 January 1998 as did the theologians on 5 May 1998 and the C.C.S. on 6 October 1998. John Paul II approved this miracle on 21 December 1998 and beatified Reggio on 3 September 2000 in Saint Peter's Square before a crowd of 80,000 people.

=== Miracle ===
The miracle that led to Reggio's beatification in 2000 was the miraculous healing of the girl Pabla Valdenegro Romero (b. 1979) who suffered from Guillain-Barré Syndrome - or polyradiculoneuritis - along with albumin-cytological dissociation ascending paralysis with cranial nerve involvement and quadriplegia as well as prolonged lung failure and two cardiac arrests as well as subcutaneous emphysema and other complications. This instantaneous healing came on 10 November 1985.
