= Our Lady of the Assumption Church, Caselle Landi =

Coordinates: 45.1035°N 9.7966°E

Our Lady of the Assumption Church
- Chiesa dell'Assunzione della Beata Vergine Maria
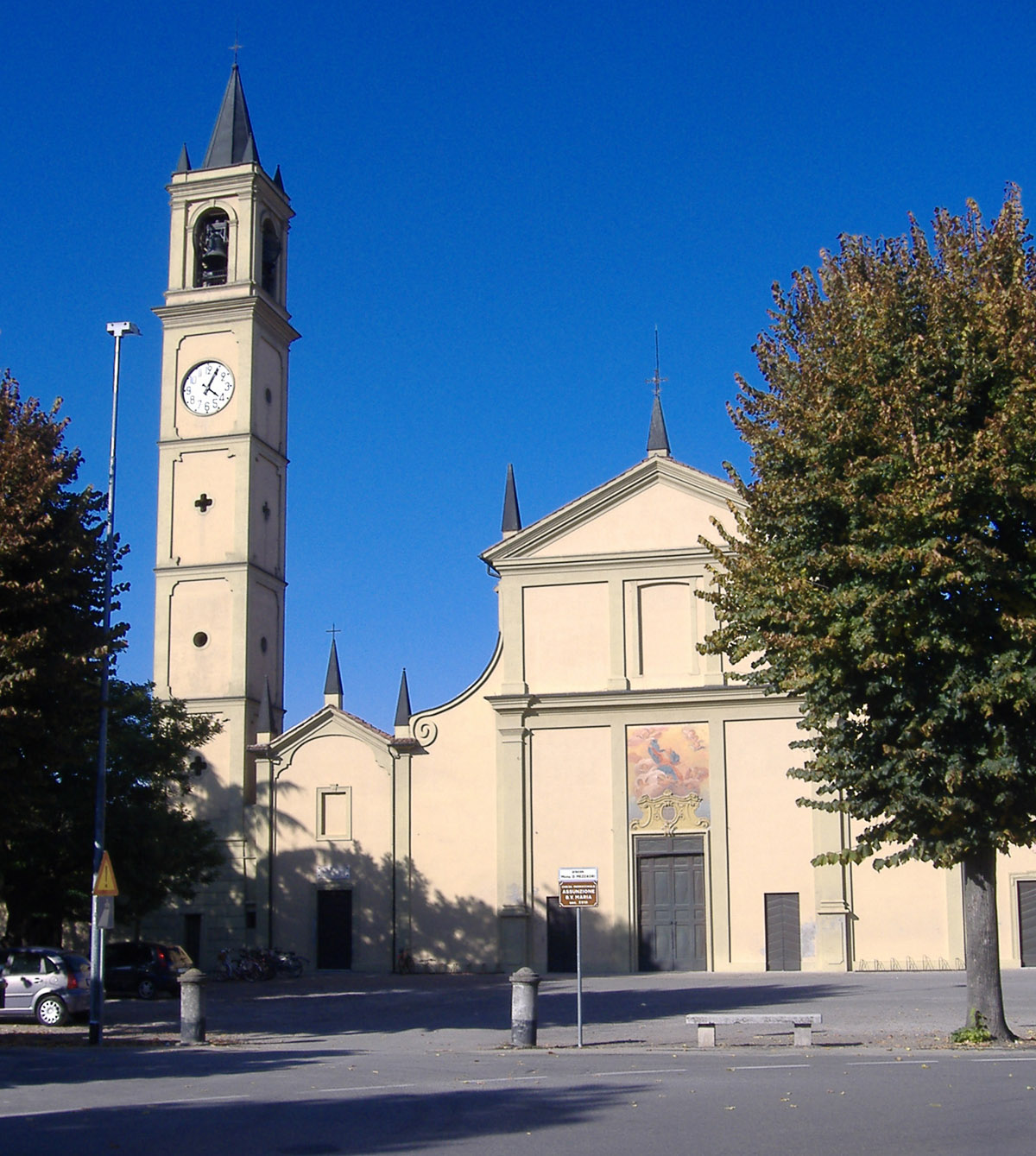
- Our Lady of the Assumption Church
- Location: Lombardy
- Country: Italy
- Denomination: Roman Catholic Church

The Our Lady of the Assumption Church (Italian: Chiesa dell'Assunzione della Beata Vergine Maria) is a Catholic church in Caselle Landi, a small village in Italy.

The church is located in the province of Lodi, in the region of Lombardy, 74 kilometres (46 mi) south of Milan and 15 kilometres (9.3 mi) north of Piacenza.

== History ==
The building has undergone various restorations and remodeling, including the last one after the flood of the Po in 1951 which devastated the entire Lower Lodi area.

=== External ===
It is a rectangular building with semicircular apse and a single nave. The bell tower until 1891 was behind the apse, the current one is detached from the church by the chapel of Our Lady of Lourdes. The façade, over the years, has undergone various restorations, often not improving. The current one, from the 1990s, is now crumbling and would require further conservative work.

=== Internal ===
The interior has a single nave. At the entrance, on the left, there is the baptistery with a niche dedicated to Nativity of Mary. On the right a fresco of saint Frances Xavier Cabrini (work by Luigi Arzuffi) leaving for the American mission.

Following, on the right is the chapel of Our Lady of the Rosary, and on the left of s. Anthony of Padua.

The second chapels are dedicated to the Sacred Heart and Our Lady of Sorrows. The last chapels are dedicated to saint Joseph and saint Sabinus of Piacenza, protector of the village. In the various chapels, there are smaller statues of other saints.

The presbytery was modernized in the 1970s with the positioning of the altar towards the people and the bringing of the main altar towards the apse. The latter and the central nave were restored between the spring of 2016 and the summer of 2019 by the parish priest at the time. The central nave features frescoes (works by Paolo Zambelli) depicting the evangelists, other saints, the Dormition of Mary and Saint Savino who, from above, protects Caselle Landi.

== See also ==
- Roman Catholicism in Italy
- Our Lady of the Assumption Church (disambiguation)

== Gallery ==
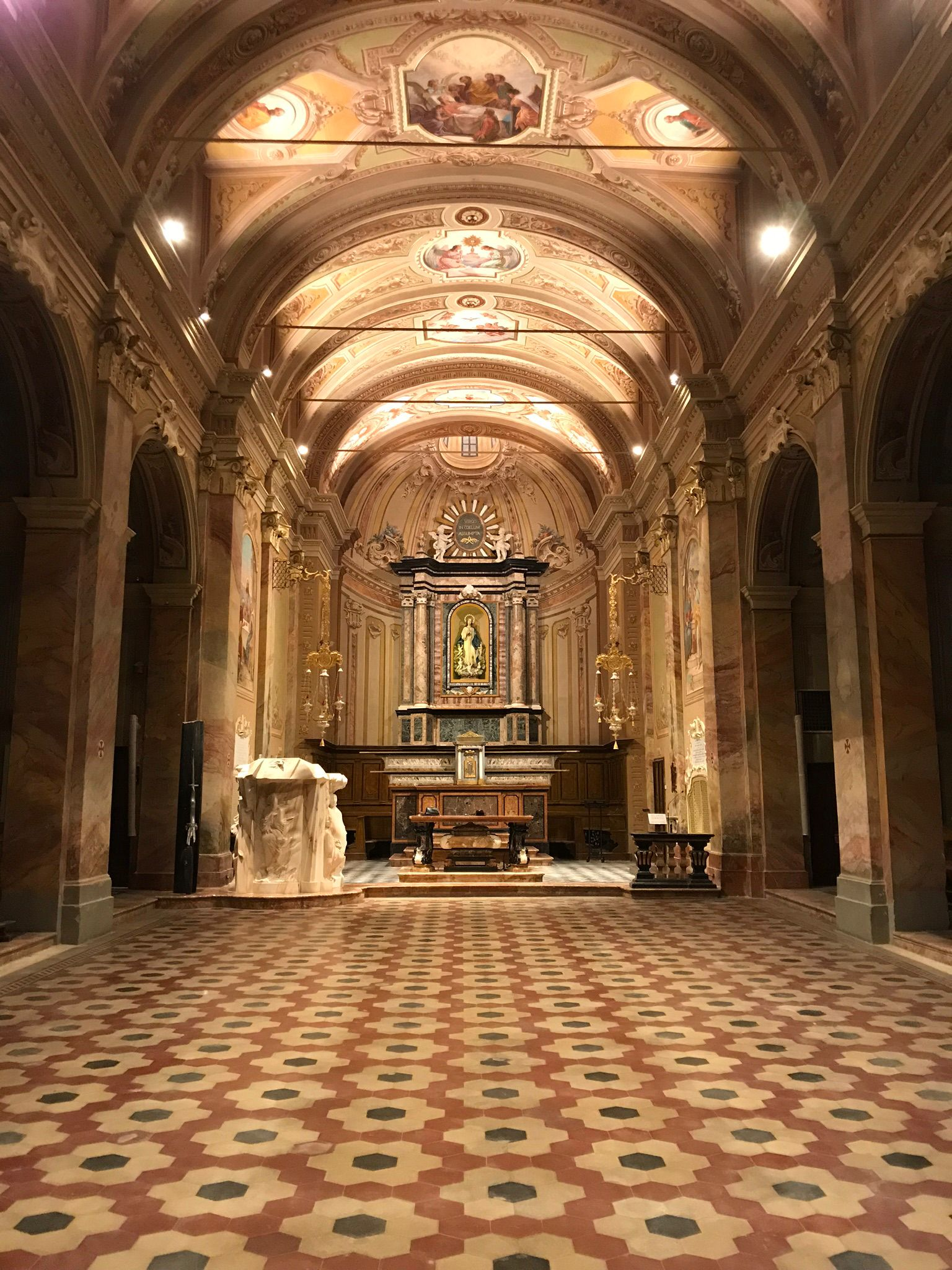
Interior of the Church

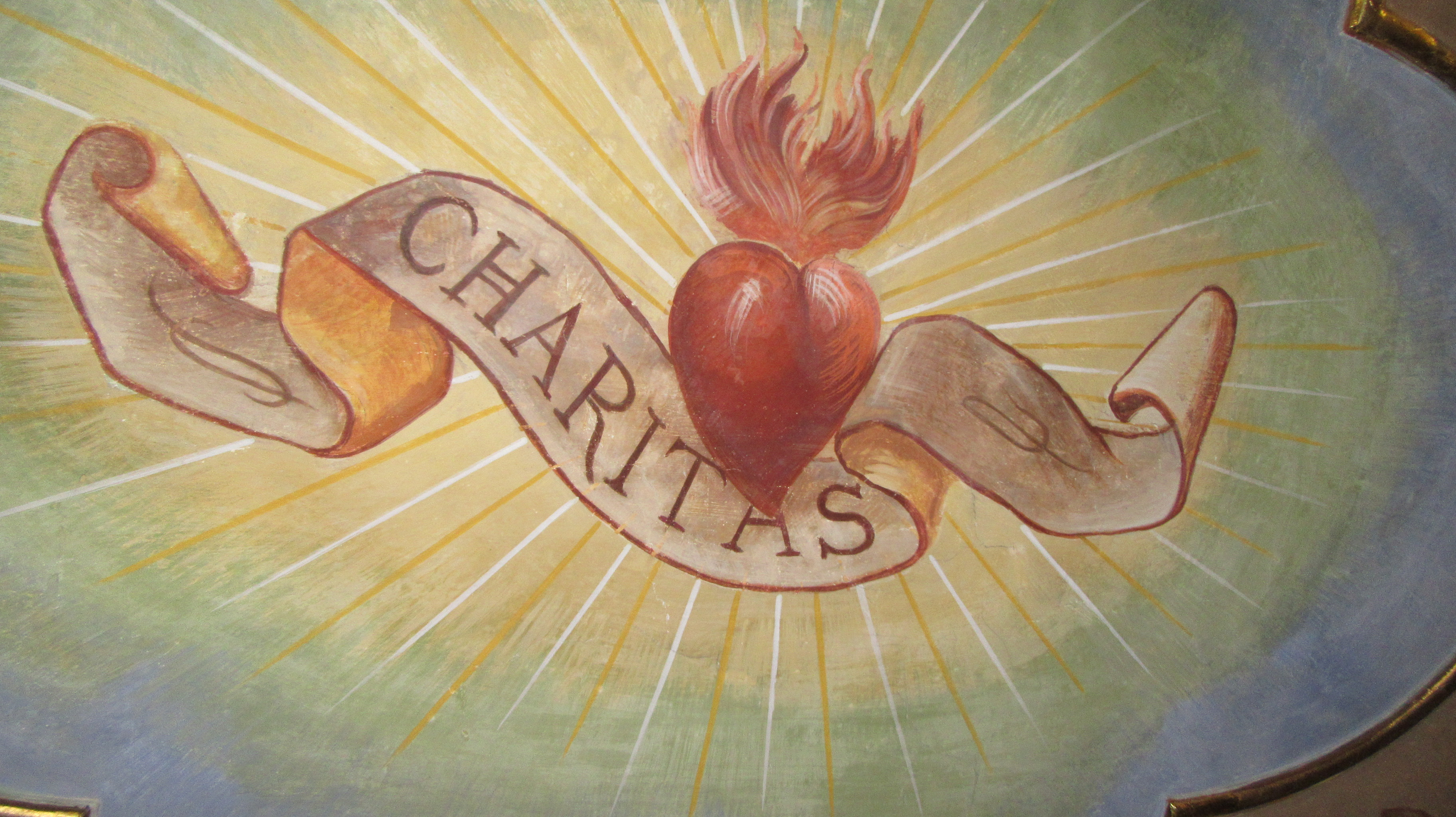
Sacred Heart's fresco, on the apse sink

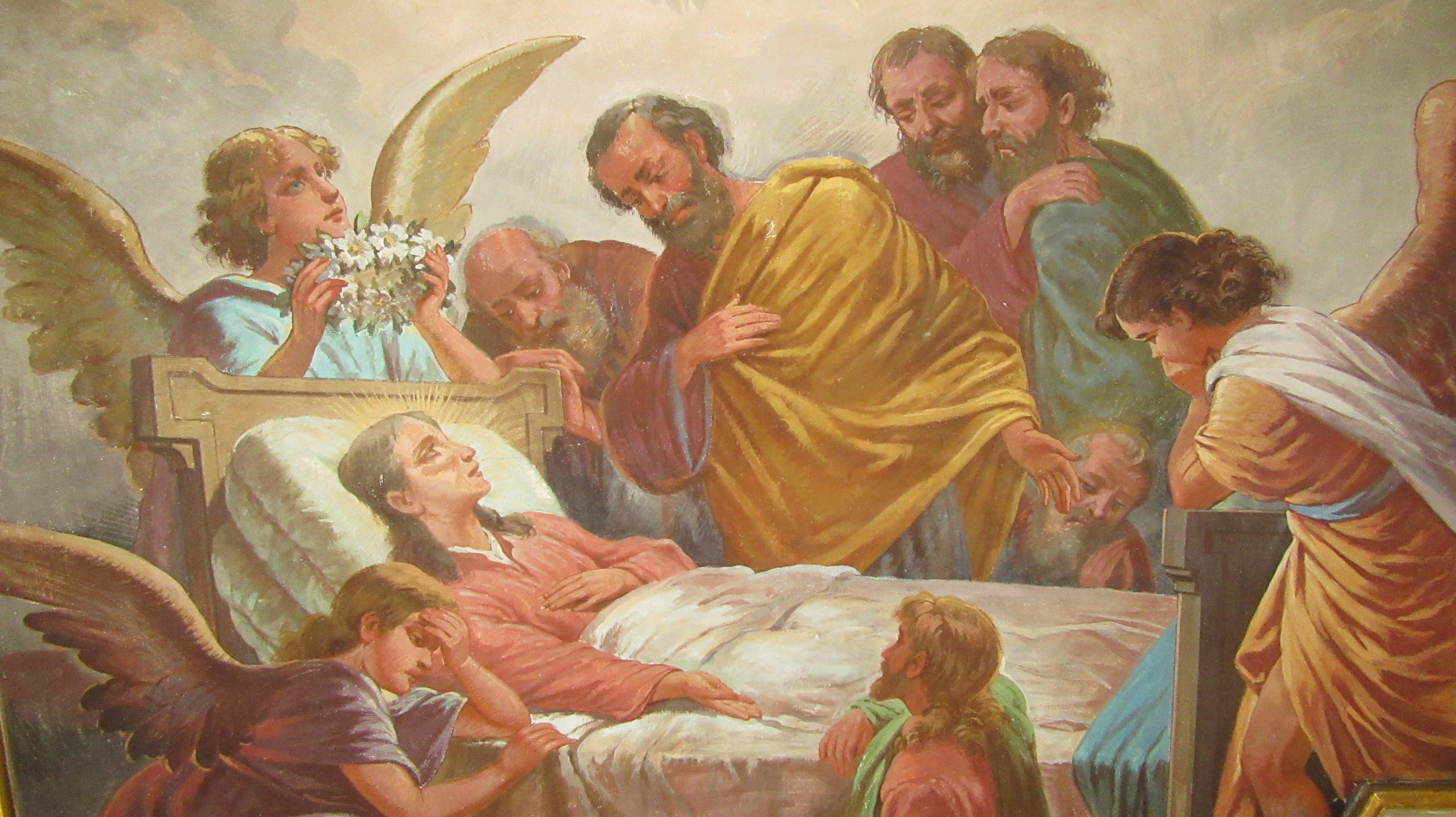
Dormition's fresco, on the central nave

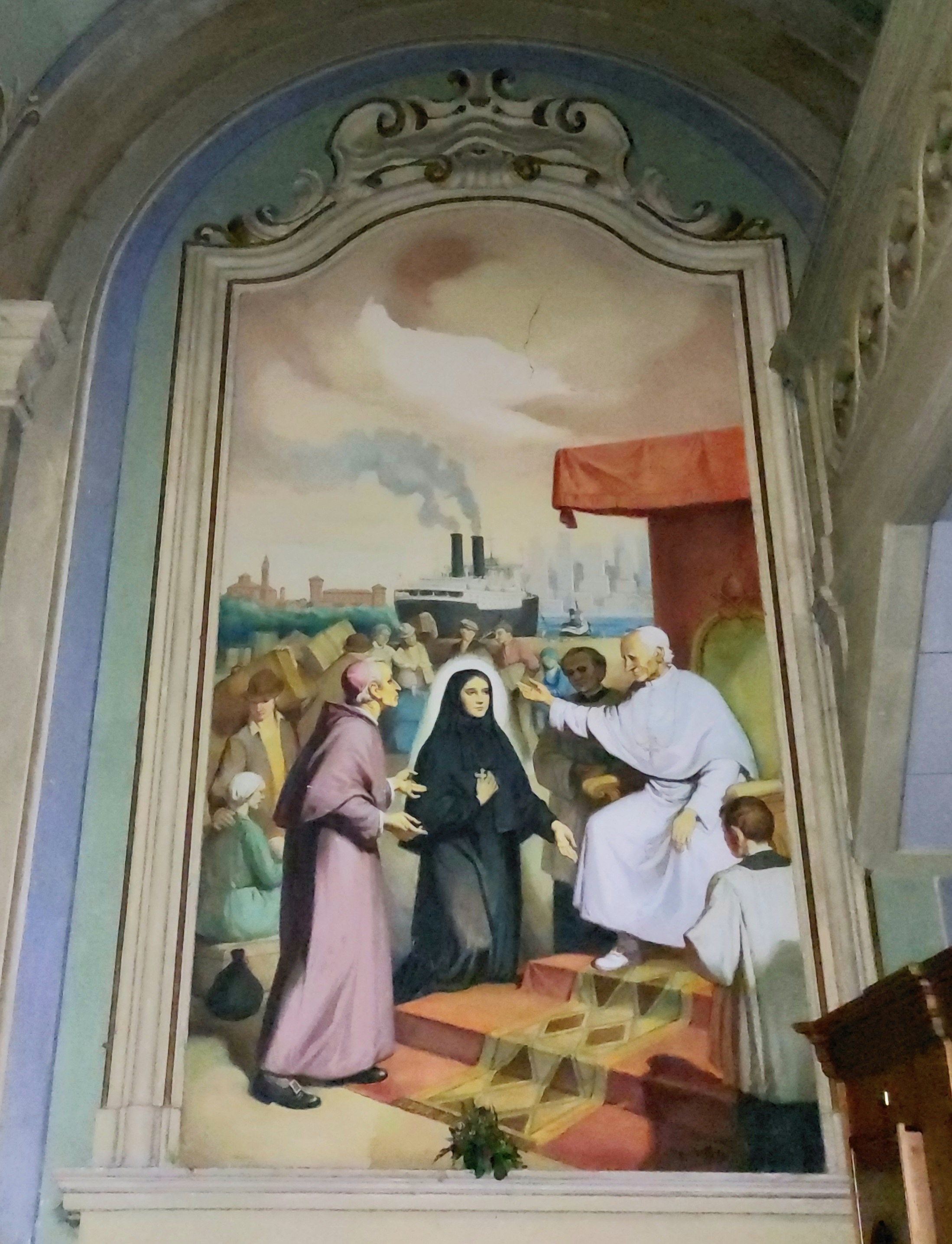
Mother Cabrini's fresco, entering right

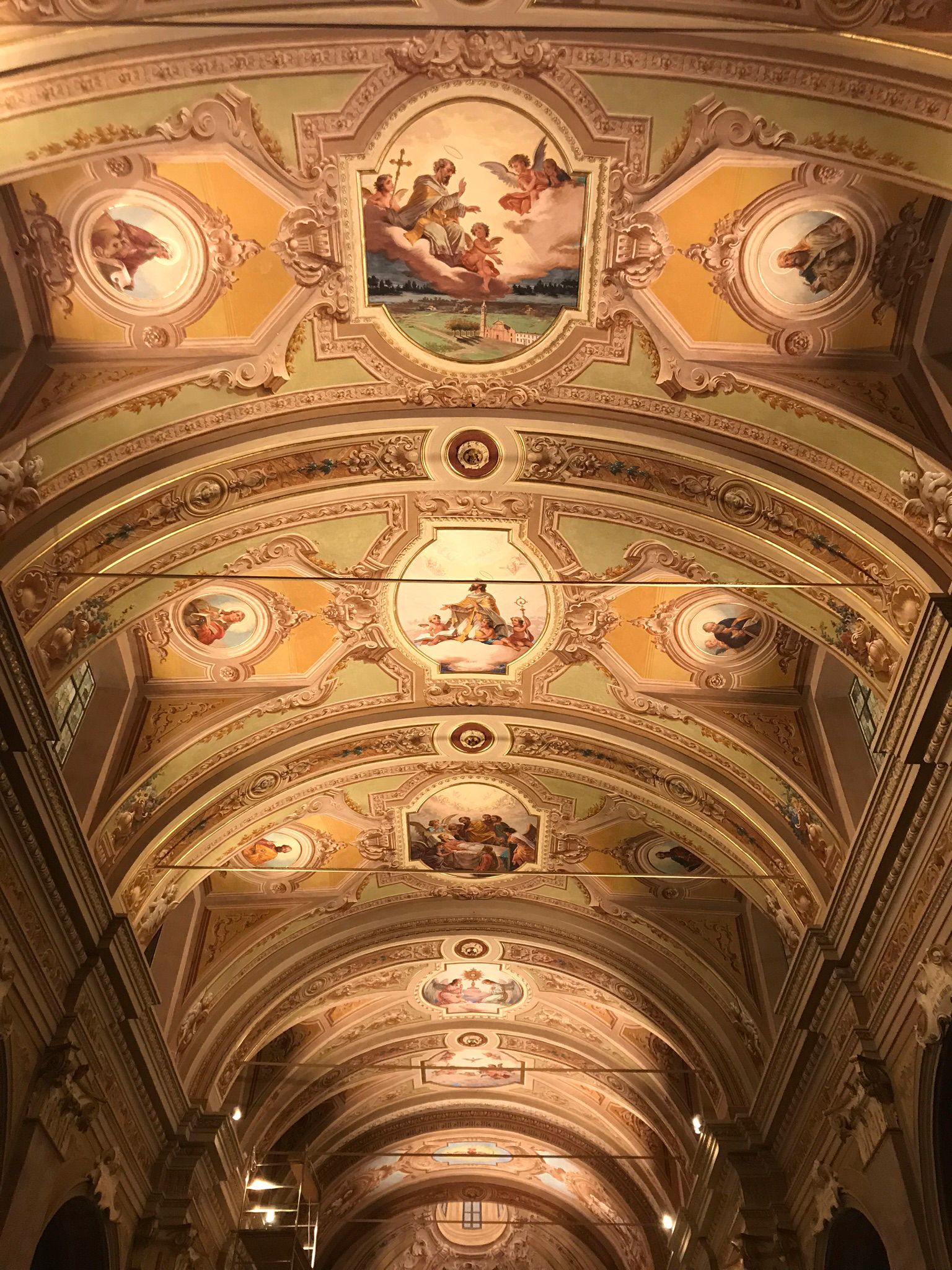
The nave, after last restoration, in summer 2019

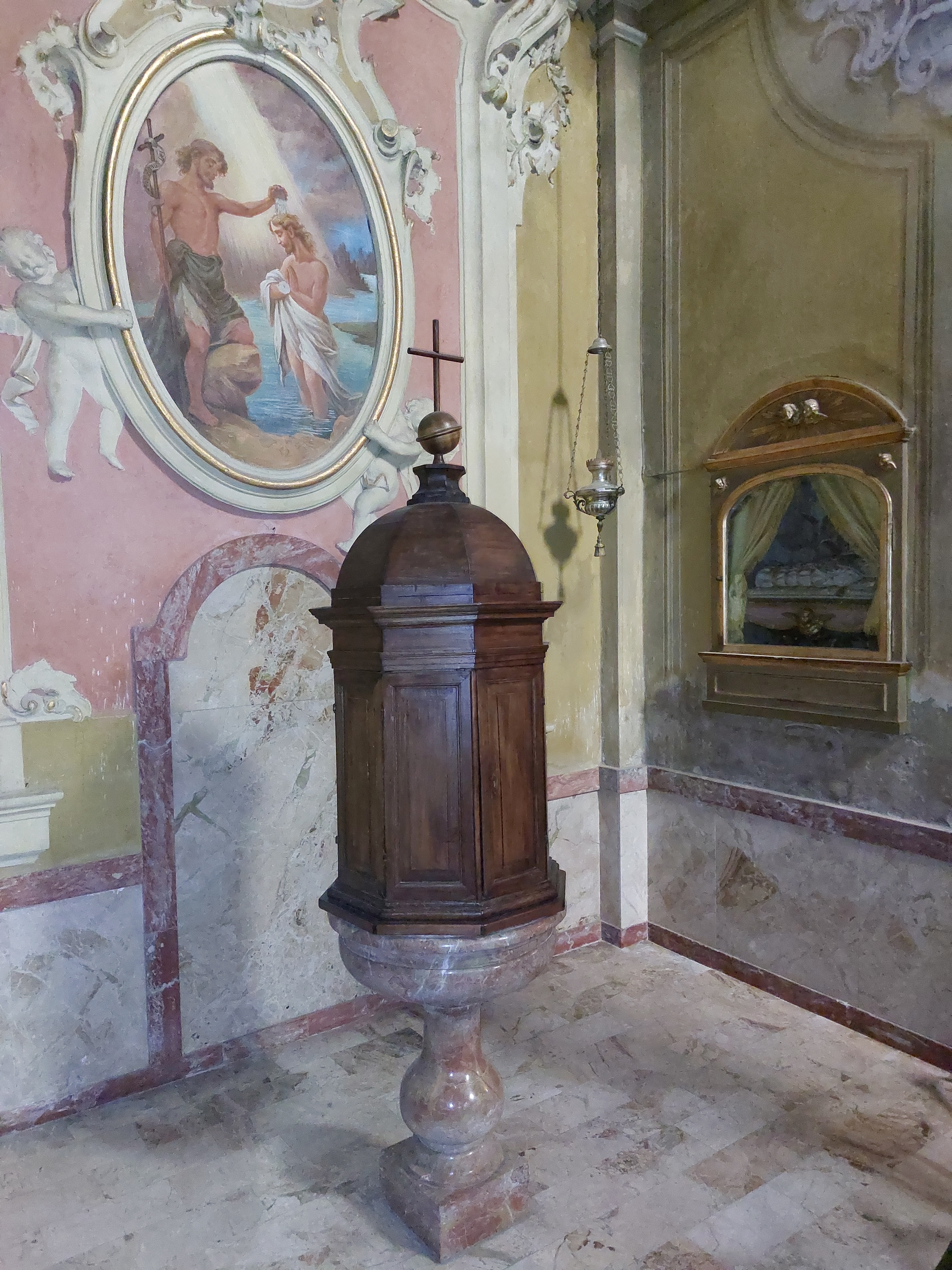
The baptismal font

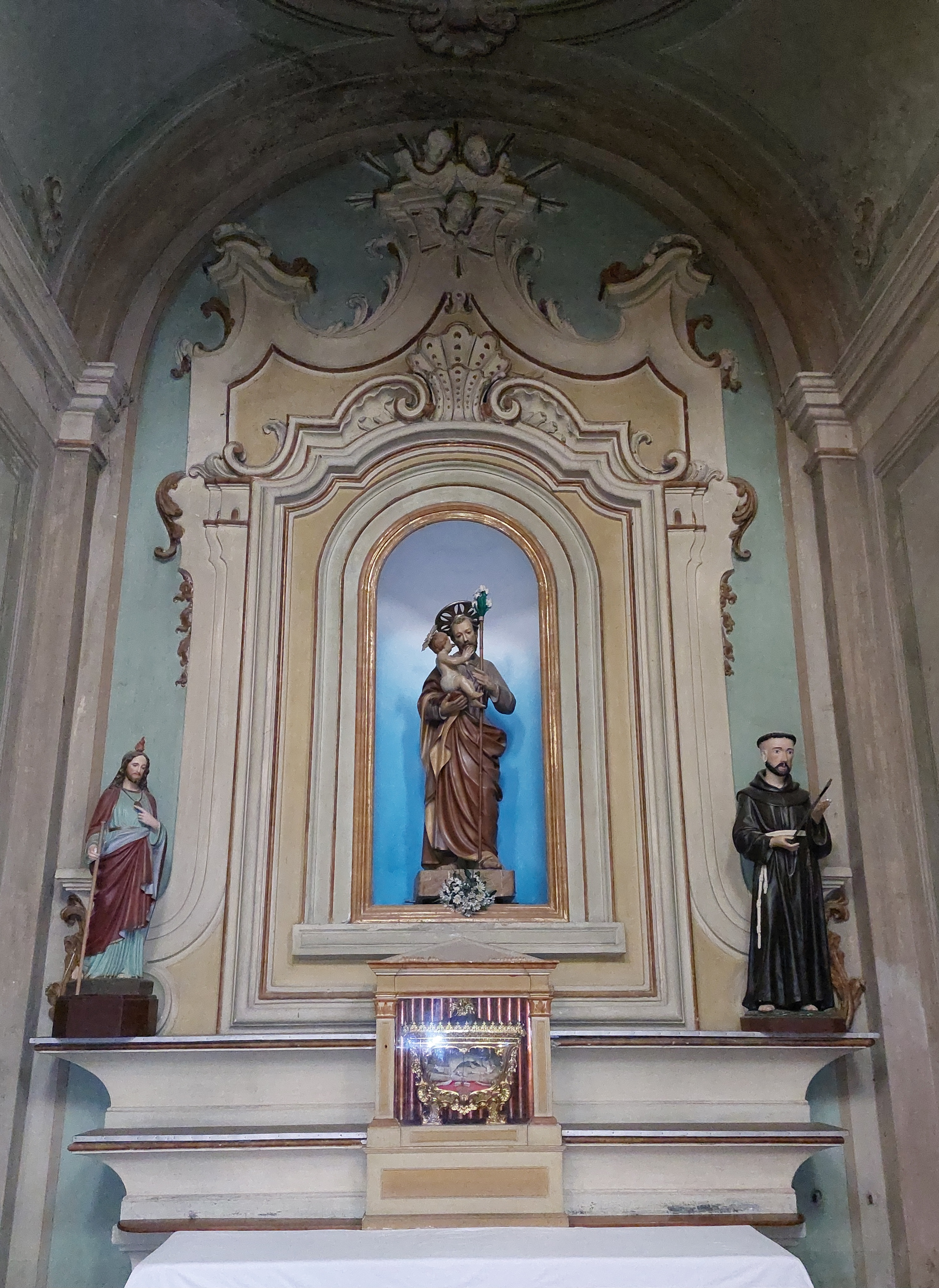
Saint Joseph's chapel, with the reliquary of saint Paolino
