= Giuseppe Marchetti (critic) =

Italian literary critic and journalist (1934–2021)

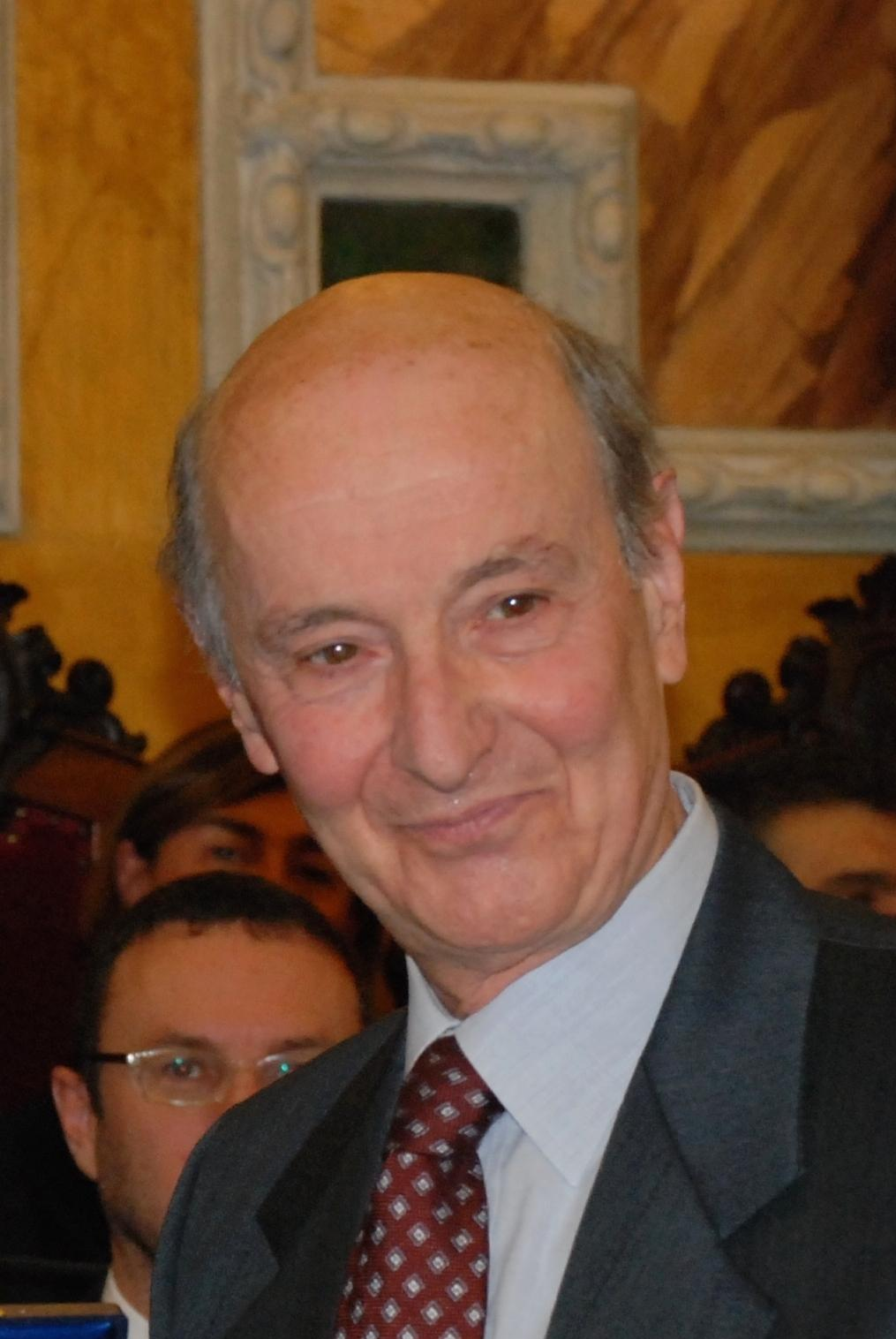
Giuseppe Marchetti in 2010

Giuseppe Marchetti (10 November 1934 – 30 August 2021) was an Italian literary critic and journalist.
