= Clelia Merloni =

Italian nun

Blessed Clelia Merloni
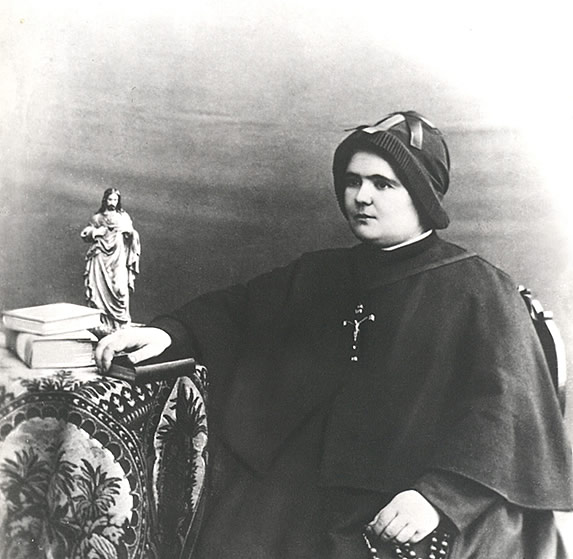
- Born: 10 March 1861; Forlì, Kingdom of Italy
- Died: 21 November 1930 (aged 69); Rome, Italy
- Venerated in: Roman Catholic Church
- Beatified: 3 November 2018, Basilica di San Giovanni in Laterano, Rome, Italy by Cardinal Giovanni Angelo Becciu
- Feast: 20 November

Clelia Merloni (10 March 1861 – 21 November 1930) was an Italian Roman Catholic nun and the founder of the Apostles of the Sacred Heart of Jesus. Merloni was destined to follow her father into the business world but renounced his anti-religious sentiment and instead went down the religious path. Internal complications led to Merloni's fall from grace and she went into self-imposed exile where she received a dispensation to break from her religious vows. She later rejoined the congregation as a nun not long before her death.

The beatification process commenced in 1988 under Pope John Paul II and she was titled as a Servant of God. Pope Francis confirmed her heroic virtue on 21 December 2016 and named her as Venerable. Francis later confirmed a miracle attributed to her in 2018 and she was beatified in the Basilica of Saint John Lateran in Rome on 3 November 2018.

== Life ==
Clelia Merloni was born on 10 March 1861 in Forlì to Gioacchino Merloni and Teresa Brandinelli. She was baptized mere hours after her birth in the diocesan cathedral of Santa Croce from Bishop Pietro Paolo Trucchi.

Merloni's mother died in 1864 and her maternal grandmother became her guardian. Her father remarried in 1866 to Maria Giovanna Boeri and both her grandmother and stepmother did their best to instill religious values and a love of God in her. Her father became engrossed in his work and his rising socio-economic status and this led to him exiting the faith and becoming instead an anti-clerical Freemason.

Despite her frail health her father sought to provide her with the best education that was possible to attain in order to prepare her for following him in his business. She attended a private school in her town where she learnt basic skills such as reading and mathematics while also learning sewing and piano skills.

Merloni began to demonstrate signs that her father's business ambitions were not intended for her and due to conflict of this nature her father began to grow suspicious of Merloni's grandmother and the things she was attempting to instill in his daughter – it led to Merloni's grandmother being forced out of the house. The situation became aggravated when marriage struggles saw Merloni's stepmother leave the household to live with other relatives. She often fled to her room to do penance for her father's misdeeds and withdrawal from the faith. The death of her father in 1895 – who reconciled to the faith before his death – saw his estate left to Merloni, which she used to open an orphanage.

Merloni later joined the Figlie di Santa Maria della Divina Provvidenza – the order that Luigi Guanella founded – and while there amongst the congregation in Como realized a call to form an order that would be devoted to the Sacred Heart of Jesus Christ. She founded that order – on 30 May 1894 in Viareggio. She had left for Viareggio with her friend Elisa Penderzini while a third friend Giuseppina D'Ingenheim joined them a few weeks later before she founded her order.

In 1896 a financial disaster – due to her dishonest financial administrator – bought about great humiliation on the order which in turn led to public opinion turning against them. Merloni was soon told that her life was in danger and was advised to leave Viareggio for elsewhere – she sought refuge with the order based in Broni.

It was to her benefit that she later met the Bishop of Piacenza Giovanni Battista Scalabrini and on 10 June 1900 the latter granted diocesan approval to Merloni's order and approved its Rule of Life. Also on 10 June 1900 the bishop accepted the profession of Merloni into her own order and the profession of ten other religious. The seat of the order then moved to Scalabrini's diocese of Piacenza. Scalabrini also desired that the congregation also extend to the foreign missions and on 10 August 1900 six of the religious departed from Genoa to São Paulo in Brazil. Four more left in October 1900 for Santa Felicidade in Paraná also in Brazil while six more sailed on 16 June 1902 from Genoa on the British ship "The Vancouver" for Boston to aid the Missionaries of Saint Charles Borromeo. In 1903 there were 30 houses with 200 sisters.

Scalabrini's death in 1905 led to the motherhouse being transferred to Alessandria and also saw the decline of Merloni's good standing amongst the congregation. In 1911 the Vatican removed her from the leadership and named as Superior General Marcellina Vigano. She withdrew from the public due to this and in 1916 both requested and received a dispensation that would release her from her religious vows. During her exile Pope Benedict XV granted the decree of praise of the order on 17 July 1921. On 28 February 1928 she requested permission to renter the congregation and on 7 March 1928 was welcomed at the motherhouse in Rome where the order was now based since 1916. Vigano issued a circular letter that read: "Our most ardent desires have finally been fulfilled! ... Our beloved Mother Foundress is once again with us all of the seventh of this month. The Sacred Heart has restored her health so that she may now enjoy here in the motherhouse, surrounded by the love of her daughters, that peace and quiet which she needs so much, after so many trials and sorrows".

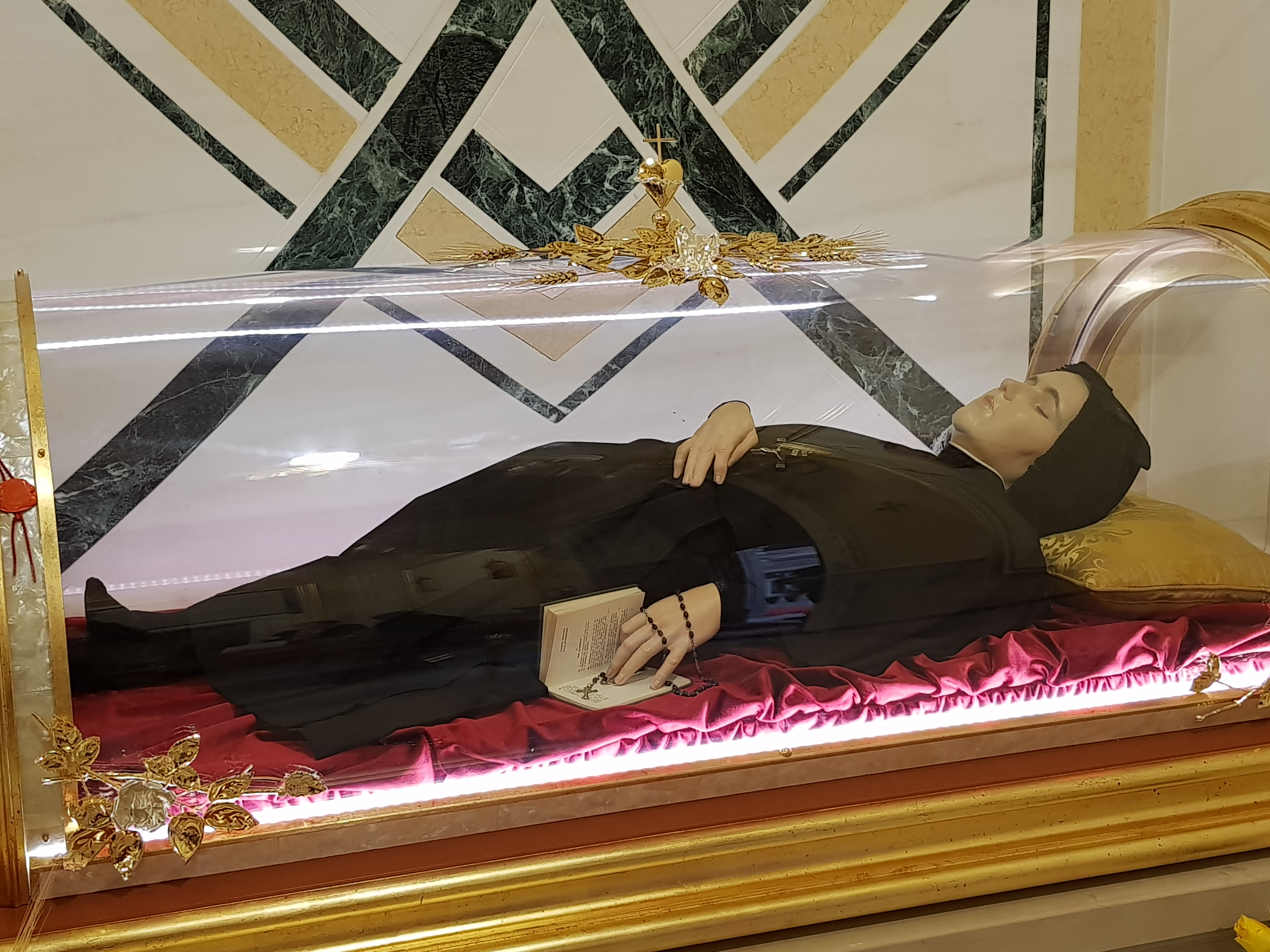
Tribute to Clelia Merloni

Merloni died on 21 November 1930 in Rome and was buried at Campo Verano; but later exhumed and found intact in 1945. Her remains were then transferred to the motherhouse of the order. The order itself now has 1200 members in nations such as Taiwan and Switzerland in 195 houses. Her order received full papal approval from Pope Pius XI on 24 March 1931 while Pope Pius XII approved the constitutions of the congregation on 17 October 1941.

== Beatification ==
The initial steps for the beatification of Mother Clelia began in 1988 at the request of the Congregation of the Apostles of the Sacred Heart of Jesus. She was titled as a Servant of God on 18 May 1990 when the Congregation for the Causes of Saints issued the "nihil obstat" decree. The process saw 60 witness testimonies come from Brazil and the United States in addition to from Merloni's native homeland. The diocesan phase ended on 1 April 1998 with the C.C.S. validating the process on 7 August 1999.

In 2014 the postulation submitted the Positio - a detailed dossier of 1385 pages on her life and holiness that examined her virtue. In 2015 historical consultants for the C.C.S. had examined the dossier and confirmed her virtue while theologians followed suit on 25 October 2015. On 1 December 2016, Pope Francis signed the decree confirming her life of heroic virtue and named Merloni as Venerable.

The miracle for her beatification was investigated in Rome from 25 January 2005 until 11 April 2011. Medical experts confirmed the miraculous nature of the healing presented on 23 February 2017 while theologians determined the miracle came as a result of her direct intercession on 27 June 2017. The C.C.S. confirmed these findings on 9 January 2018. On 27 January 2018 the pope approved the decree recognizing the miracle obtained through Merloni's intercession which approved her for beatification. The beatification was celebrated in the Basilica of Saint John Lateran on 3 November 2018.

=== Beatification miracle ===
The story of the miracle dates back to 14 March 1951, when the Brazilian doctor, Pedro Ângelo de Oliveira Filho, was stricken suddenly by a progressive paralysis of all four limbs and was rushed to Santa Casa de Misericordia di Ribeirão Preto Hospital. He was diagnosed with an ascending progressive paralysis known as Landry's paralysis or Guillain-Barré syndrome. Within a few weeks the paralysis worsened and spread, resulting in acute respiratory failure. It eventually caused difficulty in swallowing.

The prognosis was fatal in view of the seriousness of the condition and the limited medical options for a cure which were available at that time. When the paralysis reached the throat, the doctors discontinued treatments. On March 20 the doctors informed the family that he would not survive the night. With that news the patient's wife, Angelina Oliva, sought out Sr. Adelina Alves Barbos to ask for prayers. The sister gave her a novena to Mother Clelia along with a holy card containing a piece of fabric from the veil that Mother Clelia wore. Sr. Adelina approached the sick man and gave him a cup of water in which she had placed the tiny relic. Although he was gravely ill, he managed to take some of the water. After a few minutes, those present noticed that he was able to swallow.

When the doctor on call arrived in the morning and saw the patient cured, he exclaimed that it was a miracle. Pedro Ângelo continued to improve, and within three weeks he was walking normally. On 6 May he was released from the hospital for his healing was complete, permanent, and without relapse or signs of any symptoms. The doctor died on 25 September 1976, of cardiac arrest, 25 years after his miraculous cure.
