= Apostles of the Sacred Heart of Jesus =

Congregation of religious women, founded in Viareggio, Italy

Congregation of the Apostles of the Sacred Heart of Jesus
- Abbreviation: ASCJ
- Formation: May 30, 1894; 131 years ago
- Founder: Bd. Clelia Merloni
- Founded at: Viareggio, Italy
- Type: Catholic religious order
- Purpose: To bring the tender love of Christ to the poor, orphans, widows and the abandoned.
- Headquarters: Rome, Italy
- Region served: Asia, Africa, North America, South America, Europe
- Members: 1,200
- Motto: Latin: Caritas Christi Urget Nos; English: The Love of Christ Inspires Us
- Superior General: Mother Miriam Cunha Sobrinha, ASCJ
- Councilors: List: Sr. Lucia Soccio, ASCJ Councilor; Sr. Lucia Giussani, ASCJ Councilor; Sr. Maria de Lourdes Castanha, ASCJ Councilor; Sr.Josefina Suzin, ASCJ Secretary; Sr.Laura Mazzoleni, ASCJ Treasurer
- Parent organization: Catholic Church
- Website: ascjus.org
- Formerly called: Missionary Zelatrices of the Sacred Heart of Jesus

The Congregation of the Apostles of the Sacred Heart of Jesus (ASCJ), previously known as the Missionary Zelatrices of the Sacred Heart of Jesus, is an international congregation of religious women, founded in Viareggio, Italy, in 1894, by the Blessed Mother Clelia Merloni (1861–1930).

== History ==
Clelia Merloni was born to Gioacchino and Teresa Brandinelli Merloni on March 10, 1861, in Forli, Italy, and attended a private school in the suburbs. After experiencing religious life in different congregations, Clelia entered the Congregation of the Daughters of St. Mary of Divine Providence, founded in Como by Don Luigi Guanella. She wished to establish a new congregation dedicated to works of charity and founded the Congregation of the Apostles of the Sacred Heart of Jesus in Viareggio, Italy, May 30, 1894.

The Congregation expanded rapidly and seemed to hold great promise. In 1895 her father died, leaving Clelia his estate. A dishonest financial administrator put the congregation into bankruptcy. On June 10, 1900, Bishop Giovanni Battista Scalabrini of Piacenza granted episcopal approbation to the Congregation of the Apostle Missionaries of the Sacred Heart of Jesus and approved its rule with a new Missionary dimension. Bishop Scalabrini had been looking for a foundation of Sisters to assist the emigrants who had left Italy in search of livelihood in the Americas. The central seat of the congregation was established in Piacenza.

On August 10, 1900, six Apostle Missionaries departed from Genoa on the ship Piedmont for São Paulo, Brazil. Two years later, on June 16, 1902, six Apostle Missionaries sailed from Genoa on the English ship The Vancouver for Boston, Massachusetts, to aid the Missionaries of St. Charles. Within a short time these sisters had gathered about 200 children from the area and organized Christian Doctrine classes for them.

The movement became a target and the movement's founder was forced into hiding. The nuns gained some protection from Bishop Giovanni Batista Scalabrini but he died in 1905 and the movement was moved to Alessandria. In 1911 the church removed the founder from office. Mother Merloni died on November 21, 1930, in the Generalate in Rome, and was buried in the chapel. She was replaced by Marcelline Vigano, who was recalled from America where she had created a new novitiate.

In 2011, on the 150th anniversary of the founder's birth, the Pope praised the work of the Apostles of the Sacred Heart of Jesus.

== Today ==
The Apostles of the Sacred Heart of Jesus profess the evangelical counsels of Chastity, Poverty, and Obedience. The congregation numbers about 1,200 sisters on five continents. The Congregation is divided into 5 Provinces and 2 Vice Provinces, each with its own government subject to the general government. The sisters work in Italy, Switzerland, Brazil, Argentina, Chile, Paraguay, Uruguay, the United States, Mozambique, Benin, Albania, Taiwan, Ireland, and the Philippines.

The U.S. Provincialate is located at Mount Sacred Heart, 295 Benham Street, Hamden, Connecticut, where the sisters run Sacred Heart Academy. In St. Louis, Missouri, they operate a preschool program at Sacred Heart Villa, and they also run an all-girls high school, Cor Jesu Academy. Apostle Immigrant Services is a nonprofit agency that provides a range of educational programs and legal immigration services to the greater New Haven, Connecticut, community.

There are about 130 professed members who work in Connecticut, New York, Pennsylvania, Missouri, and Florida. Their principal ministries of service are in education (all age levels), health care, missionary activity, and social work and pastoral service.

== See also ==
- Sacred Heart of Jesus
