= Giovanni Battista Scalabrini =

Italian Catholic prelate & saint (1839–1905)

Saint Giovanni Battista Scalabrini CS
- Bishop of Piacenza
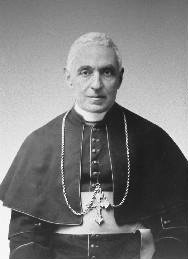
- Church: Catholic Church
- Diocese: Piacenza
- See: Piacenza
- Appointed: 28 January 1876
- Installed: 13 February 1876
- Term ended: 1 June 1905
- Predecessor: Antonio Ranza
- Successor: Giovanni Maria Pellizzari

Orders
- Ordination: 30 May 1863 by Carlo Marzorati
- Consecration: 30 January 1876 by Alessandro Franchi

Personal details
- Born: Giovanni Battista Scalabrini; 8 July 1839 Fino Mornasco, Como, Kingdom of Lombardy–Venetia
- Died: 1 June 1905 (aged 65) Piacenza, Kingdom of Italy
- Buried: 5 June 1905; Piacenza Cathedral
- Parents: Luigi Scalabrini; Colomba Trombetta
- Motto: Video Dominum innixum scalæ (Latin for 'I see the Lord at the top of the stairway"')
- Coat of arms

Sainthood
- Feast day: 1 June
- Venerated in: Catholic Church
- Beatified: 9 November 1997; Saint Peter's Square, Vatican City by Pope John Paul II
- Canonized: 9 October 2022; Saint Peter's Square, Vatican City by Pope Francis
- Attributes: Episcopal attire
- Patronage: Diocese of Piacenza; Catholic Action; Migrants; Italian immigrants; Missionaries of Saint Charles; Mission Sisters of Saint Charles; Catechists; Missionaries

Giovanni Battista Scalabrini, CS (8 July 1839 – 1 June 1905) was an Italian Catholic missionary who served as Bishop of Piacenza from 1876 until his death. He was the founder of both the Missionaries of Saint Charles (also known as the Scalabrinians) and the Mission Sisters of Saint Charles.

Scalabrini's rise to the rank of bishop came at a rapid pace due to a series of lectures he gave on the First Vatican Council in 1872 and his staunch dedication to catechism, which led Pope Pius IX to dub him the "Apostle of the Catechism"; successive popes Leo XIII and Pius X held him in high esteem, but both failed to convince him to accept appointments as head of an archdiocese or as a cardinal. He made five pastoral visits across his diocese, which proved to be an exhaustive but effective mission of evangelization and his efforts at reforming seminaries and pastoral initiatives earned him praise even from the secular detractors who criticized him for his strict obedience to the pope.

His tenure as bishop resulted in the establishment of the "Saint Raphael Association" dedicated to the care of Italian migrants. This solidified through the actions of his twin religious congregations and his visits to both Brazil and the United States, where he went to meet Italian immigrants. He also dealt with the Paolo Miraglia-Gulotti schism that took place in his diocese and had known the faux-bishop after ordaining him in 1879. Scalabrini also held three important episcopal gatherings in his diocese that revitalized parish and diocesan practices and made his diocese the ground for the first-ever National Catechetical Congress in 1899; he was in the process of planning another before his death that was later celebrated in 1910.

Scalabrini's holiness was renowned across the Italian peninsula and there were countless who attested to his saintliness in an ensuing canonization process; his first title at the outset of the process was that of a Servant of God that Pope Pius XI bestowed upon him on 30 June 1926 while the confirmation of his heroic virtue allowed for Pope John Paul II to title him as Venerable on 16 March 1987. John Paul II later beatified Scalabrini in Saint Peter's Square on 9 November 1997. Pope Francis canonized him as a saint on 9 October 2022.

== Life ==
=== Education and priesthood ===
Giovanni Battista Scalabrini was born in Fino Mornasco as the third of eight children to Luigi Scalabrini and Colomba Trombetta; he was baptized just hours later at the parish church of Fino. Two brothers emigrated to the Americas (one being the educator and naturalist Pietro Scalabrini who migrated to Argentina and was the father of the writer, philosopher, journalist, essayist and poet Raúl Scalabrini Ortiz) and one sister was Luisa while a brother was Angelo. He received his Confirmation from Bishop Carlo Romano on 8 September 1840 in the Fino parish.

In his adolescence he wrote a poem in praise of the life of Aloysius Gonzaga and in his childhood often recited the Angelus while each October reciting it in the Como Cathedral. He had a devotion to Saint Joseph and Francis de Sales as well as Charles Borromeo which extended for the remainder of his life.

He first attended the local state high school where he demonstrated a remarkable intelligence that made him a top student held in high esteem and then entered the Liceo Volta college in Como where he often received prizes for his academic excellence; he had interests in both science and foreign languages. Scalabrini underwent his philosophical and theological studies in Como from the fall of 1857. In 1857 he was made a prefect of the Gallio College (a boarding school) where one of the students under his ward was Luigi Guanella. Scalabrini received the tonsure on 1 June 1860 and then went on to receive the first two minor orders on 21 December 1860 and the second two on 24 May 1861. He was elevated into the subdiaconate on 14 June 1862 in Bergamo and then into the diaconate on 12 September 1862. He later received his ordination to the priesthood in mid-1863 from Bishop Giuseppe (Joseph) Marzorati.

After being ordained he expressed a strong desire to join the missions in the Indies (his mother had consented to this wish and he had applied to PIME) but Bishop Marzorati had other ideas for him and said to him: "Your Indies are in Italy". The bishop instead appointed Scalabrini as a professor and then on 6 October 1868 rector of seminarians at Saint Abundius; he taught the Greek language and history there. On 17 July 1870 he was appointed as the pastor of the San Bartolomeo church and remained there until 1876. He distinguished himself during a cholera epidemic in 1867 through his tireless efforts to alleviate the suffering of the victims. As the pastor of the parish he opened a kindergarten in the area and wrote the "Little Catechism for Kindergartens" to go with it. In 1872 he delivered a series of eleven addresses on the First Vatican Council – something that Giovanni Bosco appreciated – and these addresses were printed in 1873 and even reached Rome which was a considerable factor in his later episcopal appointment. These were reprinted in a reduced form at the behest of Bosco himself.

=== Episcopate ===
Ordination history of Giovanni Battista Scalabrini
History
Priestly ordination
- Ordained by: Giuseppe Marzorati
Episcopal consecration
- Principal consecrator: Alessandro Franchi
- Co-consecrators: Filippo Manetti, Giulio Lenti
Episcopal succession
Bishops consecrated by Giovanni Battista Scalabrini as principal consecrator
- Angelo Antonio Fiorini: 1899
- Natale Bruni: 1900

Scalabrini received word from Pope Pius IX that he was to become the next Bishop of Piacenza at the beginning of 1876 despite the fact that the pope made up his mind in December 1875; Pius IX had once dubbed him the "Apostle of the Catechism" on 7 June 1877 and sent him a golden chalice on 6 February 1878 (just a day before the pope died). It was also Giovanni Bosco who advised Pius IX to appoint Scalabrini as a bishop. Scalabrini received his episcopal consecration from Cardinal Alessandro Franchi in Rome in the chapel of the Collegio Urbano de Propaganda Fide in Piazza di Spagna and was installed in his new see a couple of weeks after this. He set his enthronement date because he wanted to preside over the celebrations that his predecessor had called for in regards to the sixth centennial of the death of Pope Gregory X. From 1877 to 1878 he prompted the reopening of the Pontifical Lombard in Rome and was a collaborator of those in charge of it. On 17 January 1878 a group of ruffians attacked the bishop's coach along the road and threatened him for his obedience to the pope in his denial of a requiem Mass for King Vittorio Emmanuele II.

The bishop conducted five diocesan visitations and visited all the 365 parishes with half accessible via foot or mule due to being in mountainous places but this never hindered his desire to be with the people and review the conditions of each parish for himself. The first visitation began on 4 November 1876 where he learned that 11% of its members had emigrated and the visit ended on 28 August 1880. That first pastoral visitation proved to be so exhausting that his staff did not think that he would manage a second. He addressed his third pastoral letter in August 1876 to priests reminding them of the need for the Spiritual Exercises and the need to re-examine one's life. On 5 July 1876 he founded the first ever Italian catechetical magazine entitled "The Catholic Catechist". He began courses in the Gregorian Chant – something Pope Pius X later did and in 1876 licensed the first Italian catechetical review which was the second in the world; he also issued the book "Catholic Catechism" in 1876.

He held three diocesan synods with one being on the Eucharist; the first was held from 2–4 September 1879 (the first in 156 years) which focused on the needs of children while the other two were held in 1893 and 1899. The 1899 synodal document spanned 350 pages and he alone wrote the text for it. The synod on the Eucharist was held from 26 to 30 August 1899 and in that he ordered that altars be made of marble and he revived Eucharistic confraternities as well as asking that chalices be made of gilded silver. The bishop also resumed the procession of Corpus Christi despite government and secular opposition. The second synod was held from 2–4 May 1893 and dealt with diocesan administration.

He reorganized seminaries and reformed their curricula and this could be considered quite interesting since it precluded the Thomistic reform of Pope Leo XIII. Leo XIII later dubbed Piacenza "the City of Catechsis" while Cardinal Giovanni Nasalli Rocca di Corneliano praised Scalabrini's heroic efforts for leading his diocese and for the championing of the migrants. He organized collections to help farmers that were affected from the landslides at Tollara in 1895 and of Villanova and Bettola in 1904. He sent aid to flood victims in the Veneto and Polesine in 1882 as well as for the earthquake of Casamicciola in 1883. He also sent aid for those affected from the cloudburst in Campidano in 1889 as well as the families affected from the explosion of an arms depot in 1894 in Pontremoli. He made a third diocesan visitation from 1888 to 1891.

He also tended to the ill and to prisoners to comfort them. He also saved thousands of farmers and workers from the 1879–80 famine and twice sold his horses (used for pastoral visitations) as well as a pectoral cross and a golden chalice that Pope Pius IX had given him to purchase food. He oversaw the distribution of 244 460 bowls of soup with flour and firewood coupons in just two months though when pawning his valuables people believed he was at detriment; people said he would end up dead on nothing but straw but he countered and said it would be good to die where Jesus Christ was born. He often spent hours in Eucharistic adoration in addition to giving Marian homilies and going on Marian pilgrimages. He was perceived to be an eloquent orator and Luigi Orione once said that his words "showed how he burned with apostolic zeal". His master of ceremonies once said that Scalabrini recited rosaries each day and when on foot on diocesan visits often stepped aside at times from the path to recite them.

He also founded the "Deaf and Dumb Institute" in November 1879 to aid the hearing and speech impaired people and ordered that catechism be instructed in all the parishes in the diocese while in 1880 starting the diocesan newspaper "The Truth". In June 1884 a bout of colic threatened his health and it took a prolonged period to recover from his illness – this was also attributed to sheer exhaustion from his pastoral visitations. He planned and presided the first National Catechetical Congress in 1889 which opened on 24 September and closed on 26 September. One cardinal as well as eleven bishops and 400 priests were in attendance to this congress; questions discussed included his proposal for a unified catechism that the then-Bishop of Mantua Giuseppe Melchiorre Sarto (the future Pope Pius X) supported. On 9 July 1887 he established the "Saint Raphael Association" (which was later disbanded in 1923) dedicated to the care and protection of migrants and he often gave lectures on the subject in various cities such as Milan. The bishop established the association with the aid of the Marquis Giovanni Volpe Landi and Giuseppe Toniolo. In 1893 or 1894 he once contracted a hydrocele during a horse ride and kept this a close secret but his brother Angelo knew about it.

Scalabrini was convinced that Church-State relations could be repaired and thus prompted reconciliation while in 1885 the pope had asked him to look into how relations could be mended. The bishop also started working with millions of Italians forced to emigrate due to their dire conditions and therefore decided to establish a religious congregation to work with those people. He viewed migration as a social problem requiring urgent attention but also saw it as a challenge to the Christian faith that could be seen as a strong chance at evangelization. In 1887 he gave an address and recalled an instance where he met around 500 migrants at the Milan Railroad Station in 1880 which caused a "knot in the heart" which prompted him to do something to help those people; those migrants were taking the train to Genoa to take a ship to the United States of America.

He seemed to be able to foretell that Giuseppe Melchiorre Sarto would become pope – this happened in 1903 – and he also seemed to predict that Francesco Sidoli would be raised into the episcopate which later happened in 1916.

=== Friendships ===
Scalabrini was close friends with Bishop Geremia Bonomelli and the two maintained correspondence until Scalabrini's death; they first got to know each other in 1868 and became close over time. The two were also close confidantes between whom there were no secrets, and it is in Scalabrini's letters to Bonomelli that his thoughts and feelings are seen in a greater light.

=== Consecrations ===
Scalabrini ordained to the priesthood the schismatic priest and faux-bishop Paolo Miraglia-Gulotti in 1879 as well as Giacomo Maria Radini-Tedeschi also in 1879; on 29 January 1905 he aided Pope Pius X as a co-consecrator for Radini-Tedeschi after the latter was appointed Bishop of Bergamo. Scalabrini was present at that Mass in the Sistine Chapel alongside the priest Angelo Giuseppe Roncalli – the future Pope John XXIII. Scalabrini had known Radini-Tedeschi's father and brother as the three were opponents and the new bishop soon became an opponent of Scalabrini though he held him in esteem for his virtues.

Scalabrini also consecrated as bishops Angelo Antonio Fiorini, O.F.M.Cap. on 26 November 1899 and Natale Bruni on 27 December 1900.

=== Religious orders and travels ===
On 28 November 1887 he founded the Missionaries of Saint Charles and later on 19 March 1889 in Codogno dispatched Frances Xavier Cabrini and six others to go to the United States of America to tend to orphans and ill Italian migrants who had a concentrated cluster in New York City. After the tragic events of the 1898 Workers' Day he wrote "Socialism and the Action of the Clergy" which contained his social thought and adherence to Leo XIII's "Rerum Novarum" which he held as a groundbreaking social document. In 1892 he founded the "Sant'Opilio Opera" for poor clerics and in 1894 began the process of restoration for the diocesan cathedral that was finished in 1902 but inaugurated on 16 June 1901. In 1903 he founded the "Rice Workers Institute" for unionized aid to the more than 170 000 rice workers.

Scalabrini later founded a female religious order – the Mission Sisters of Saint Charles – on 25 October 1895. In late 1894 the Lucca-born priest Giovanni Marchetti left Brazil to return home looking for nuns to help him manage the new Christopher Columbus Orphanage he had set up and he presented both his mother and his sister Assunta Marchetti as well as two other girls to the bishop who sent Marchetti back to Brazil to do his work; the priest had tried to convince Scalabrini of the need for a religious order which gave the bishop something to consider.

On 18 July 1901 he travelled to Genoa where he was to set sail for the United States of America on a mission to meet and minister to Italian migrants who had settled there. The President Theodore Roosevelt received the bishop at the White House on 10 October 1901. Scalabrini also met the Cardinal Archbishop of Baltimore James Gibbons in addition to the Archbishop of New York Michael Augustine Corrigan and the Archbishop of Saint Paul and Minneapolis John Ireland. Scalabrini and was back in Piacenza on 4 November 1901 but later departed for Brazil on 17 June 1904 to visit Italian migrants where he preached in Portuguese with little pause as well as in Italian and French. But he made a brief visit to Buenos Aires to visit his professor brother Pietro whom he had not seen since 1878. He returned to Piacenza on 6 December 1904.

=== Impending promotions ===
On 30 January 1901 he had received the congratulations of Pope Leo XIII for the 25th anniversary of his episcopal consecration but the celebrations were postponed to June 1901; in February 1901 he had declined an elevation to the Archdiocese of Ravenna knowing that it implied the cardinalate. On 17 June 1901 he celebrated a Pontifical Mass with Cardinal Domenico Svampa and thirteen bishops in attendance though there would have been more had the date not been moved to June as was done. Even Cardinal Andrea Carlo Ferrari could spend just a few hours with him due to his own schedule. Scalabrini also set up a dinner that night that would accommodate for 200 old poor people.

Rumors then persisted in late 1903 and into 1904 that Pope Pius X wanted to choose him as the pope's successor as the Patriarch of Venice which also meant an inevitable elevation into the cardinalate. Scalabrini declined this and pointed to his advanced age as a reason that he chose to decline. Pius X assured Scalabrini that – upon his return from Brazil – he would be made a cardinal but the pope relented upon Scalabrini's ardent request that he not be elevated.

=== Death and burial ===
Scalabrini had an operation after a period of ill health and had spent the night before in Eucharistic adoration for a long period of time and had drawn up his will in 1904 knowing his ill health would soon get worse. He was in the middle of planning for his sixth pastoral visitation (announced on 5 May 1905) in which he asked all priests to give the Eucharist to all parishioners but had a feeling he might be able to see that visitation through due to his declining health. He had just concluded his fifth on 21 May 1905 after having been taken ill in Borghetto after being struck with a sudden fainting spell. He went to confession on 27 May and spent the night in Eucharistic adoration before being operated the next morning of 28 May. On 31 May he asked for the Viaticum and seemed to recover in what his doctor exclaimed was a miracle which prompted Scalabrini to ask for the Anointing of the Sick. But his condition deteriorated and he kept repeating: "God's will be done".

Scalabrini died at dawn on 1 June 1905 at 5:30am on the Feast of the Ascension; his last conscious words were: "Lord, I am ready, let us go". Pope Pius X cried upon hearing the news of the bishop's death and funeral rites were conducted on 4–5 June; the Archbishop of Bologna Giacomo della Chiesa – the future Pope Benedict XV – oversaw the Mass for the transferral of the bishop's remains into the Piacenza Cathedral on 18 April 1909 and said: "Saint Peter's in Rome would not be big enough for the love of Piacenza".

On 13 April 2013 his tomb was defiled after thieves stole a ring and a chalice as well as a pectoral cross; on 2 May the bishop of the diocese presided over a vigil of reparation and on 1 June celebrated a Mass for the restoration of the tomb. The thieves were under house arrest in April 2014 and the relics were never recovered. Upon his death he had written 60 pastoral letters and around 2000 pages worth of homilies. Pope Pius XII later titled him as the "Apostle to the Migrants" while Pius X had seen in him "the learned, meek, and strong bishop while Benedict XV thought of him as a "bishop beyond compare" as did Pope Pius XI who praised the "episcopal and pastoral spirit of the saintly bishop".

=== Views of his contemporaries ===
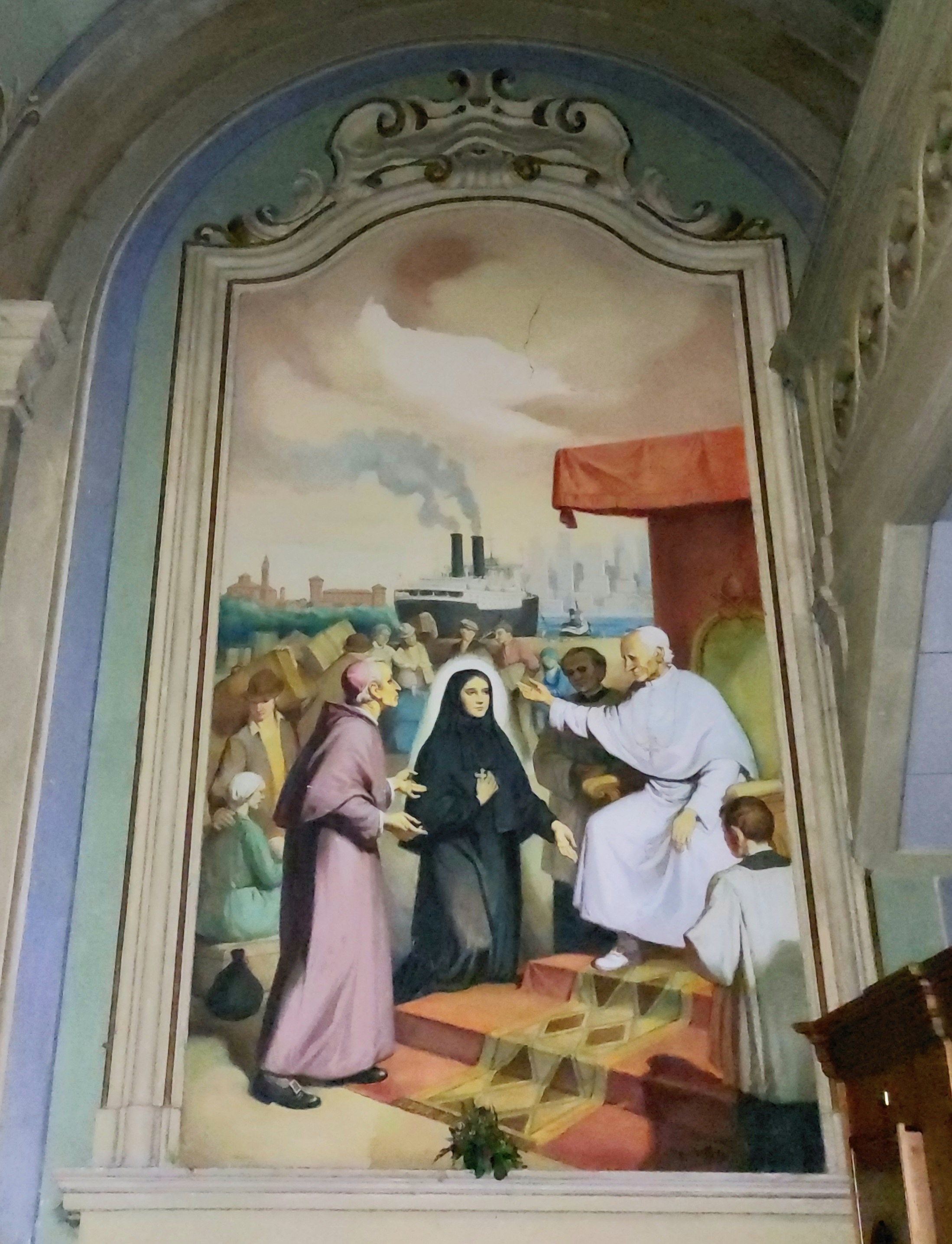
Bishop Scalabrini presents sister Francesca Cabrini to Pope Leo XIII to receive the mission in the United States. Work by Luigi Arzuffi, church of Caselle Landi, Italy.

Scalabrini's contemporaries hailed him after his death as a model shepherded who acted in great holiness and had a genuine and deep love for the people he was chosen to lead. Ludovico Mondini served as his master of ceremonies for over a decade and spoke of his holiness in addition to the meek approach he had to each of his pastoral visitations. Mondini attested as much during the beatification as did the Francesco Torta who knew Scalabrini his whole life. Massimo Rinaldi attested to his virtue in the cause as did Cardinal Nasalli Rocca and Luigi Orione.

A monument to him was placed at his old parish of San Bartolomeo in Como in 1913 and Pope Pius X sent a personal message for the occasion in which it praised the bishop and his saintliness. Pius X's successor – Benedict XV – had several dealings with Scalabrini while being in the Secretariat of State and also held Scalabrini in high esteem. Agostino Chieppi also expressed his admiration for the bishop as did Giuseppe Toniolo and Tommaso Reggio; Daniele Comboni and Leon Dehon also expressed both their veneration and appreciation for the late bishop.

Cardinal Vincenzo Moretti said that Scalabrini was "the bishop indeed made according to the heart of God" while Cardinal Antonio Agliardi also praised the bishop for his pastoral soul and his dedication to catechesis. Bishop Guillaume-Lucien-Léon Lacroix of the former Tarentaise diocese considered his death a loss not just for the Italian nation but "a great loss also for the Church". Bishop Radini-Tedeschi – despite differences he and Scalabrini had in the past – hailed him as "the most venerable and unforgettable bishop".

=== The future of the orders ===
The male order received papal approval from Pope Pius XII on 15 August 1948 and in 2005 had 234 houses with 764 religious with 597 of them being priests. That order operates in Europe in places such as France and Luxembourg, in Asia in places such as Japan and Taiwan, the Americas in countries like Bolivia and Chile, in Africa in both Mozambique and South Africa, and then in Oceania in Australia alone. Since 1910 the generalate of the male order is in Rome at the church of San Giovanni della Malva. The female order received the decree of praise from Pope Pius XI on 19 May 1934 – Cardinal Benedetto Aloisi Masella delivered the decree himself – and it received papal approval from Pius XII on 7 August 1948. It had 769 religious in 160 houses in 2005. That order operated in Europe in countries such as Poland and Switzerland, in the Americas in places such as Colombia and the Dominican Republic, in Africa in places such as Angola and the Republic of Congo, and in Asia in countries such as India and the Philippines.

== Order protection ==
Scalabrini took the Apostles of the Sacred Heart of Jesus – and its founder Clelia Merloni – under his protective wing. The movement become a target and Merloni had been forced into exile. The nuns gained some protection from Scalabrini due to his careful watch over them but the bishop's death in 1905 prompted the order to move to Alessandria. Back in 1901 he had granted diocesan approval to Merloni's order.

== Canonisation ==
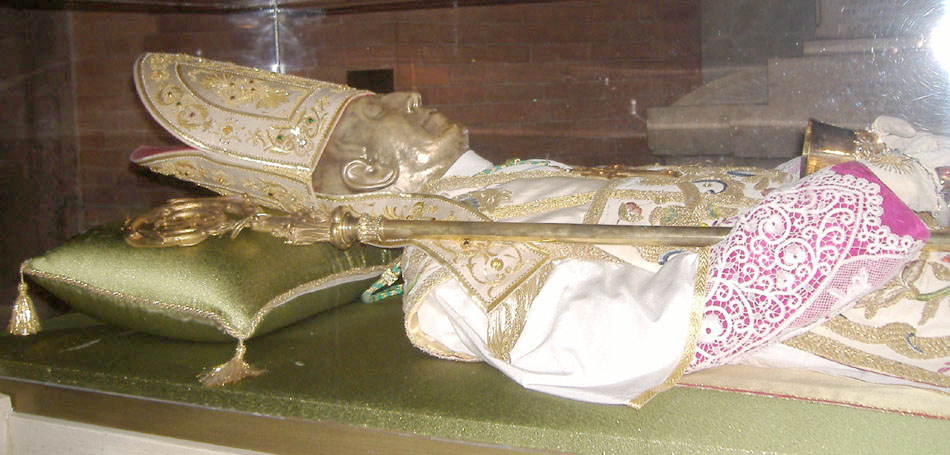
Scalabrini's tomb.

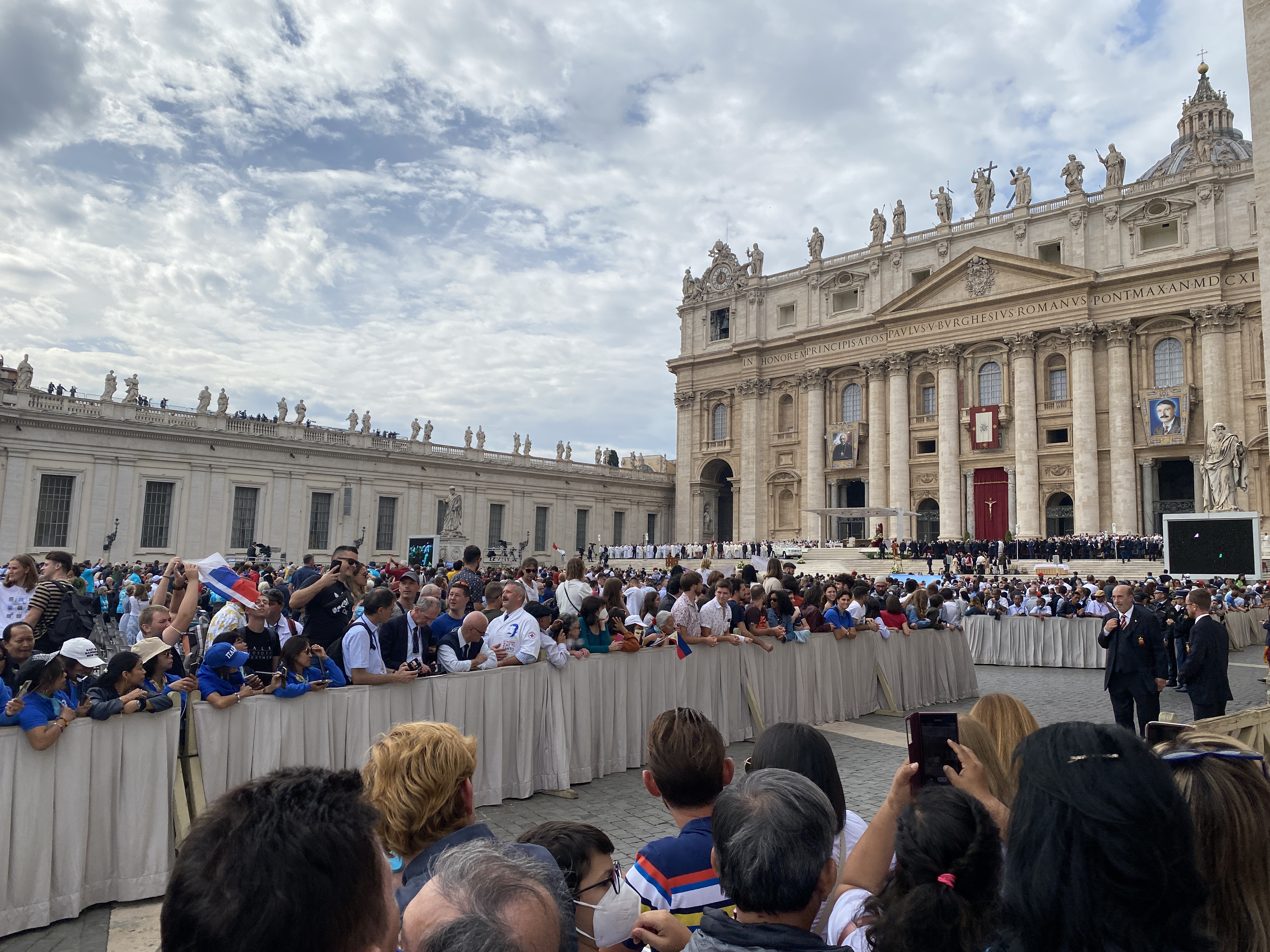
The canonization Mass on 9 October 2022.

The beatification process was held in Piacenza and the informative phase spanned from 30 June 1936 until 29 February 1940; his sister Luisa attested to his virtue but not to a great degree due to her failing strength. Archbishop Pasquale Morganti testified in favor as did Cardinal Agostino Richelmy; Giovanni Calabria, Cardinal Ferrari and the Raffaele Rossi also testified in favor. In total the informative tribunal conducted 185 sessions. On 3 April 1940, Scalabrini's cause was formally opened in Rome, and he was granted the title of Servant of God.

There were also three rogatorial processes with two in Como with the first from 23 November to 10 December 1947 and the second opening on 4 May 1940; a third was held from 26 September 1939 at Camerino. A total of 57 witnesses were questioned: 3 were co-witnesses, the postulation summoned 39 and 15 were called "ex officio". The theologians collated all of his spiritual writings and declared that these writings were not in contradiction of the magisterium therefore approved them on 18 February 1972. But these writings were approved on 30 July and 24 October 1941 though made public on 9 September 1970 and made official in 1972. The formal introduction to the cause came under Pope John Paul II on 11 May 1982 and Scalabrini was titled as a Servant of God; the apostolic process was dispensed with. The Congregation for the Causes of Saints validated the process on 20 December 1985 and received the Positio dossier from the postulation in 1986 before theologians approved the dossier on 25 November 1986 as did the C.C.S. on 17 February 1987. The confirmation of his heroic virtue on 16 March 1987 allowed for John Paul II to title him as Venerable.

The process for a miracle attributed to him spanned from 23 December 1994 to 5 June 1995 in the diocese of its origin and it received C.C.S. validation on 13 October 1995 before a panel of medical experts approved the healing to be a miracle on 5 December 1996. Theologians likewise approved it on 21 March 1997 as did the cardinal and bishop members of the C.C.S. on 3 June 1997. John Paul II approved this on 7 July 1997 and beatified Scalabrini on 9 November 1997 in Saint Peter's Square. The then-Piacenza bishop Luciano Monari was at the beatification. The postulator for this cause was the priest Sisto Caccia.

In August 2022, it was announced that he would be canonized a saint of the Catholic Church on October 9, 2022.

Pope Leo XIV links Scalabrini with Saint Frances Cabrini in his commendation of these "two great saints [who] distinguished themselves in the pastoral care of migrants.

Catholic Church titles
Preceded by Antonio Ranza	Bishop of Piacenza; 28 January 1876 – 1 June 1905	Succeeded by Giovanni Maria Pellazzari
