= Joachim-Jean-Xavier d'Isoard =

French bishop and cardinal

His Eminence Joachim-Jean-Xavier d'Isoard
- Cardinal, Archbishop of Auch
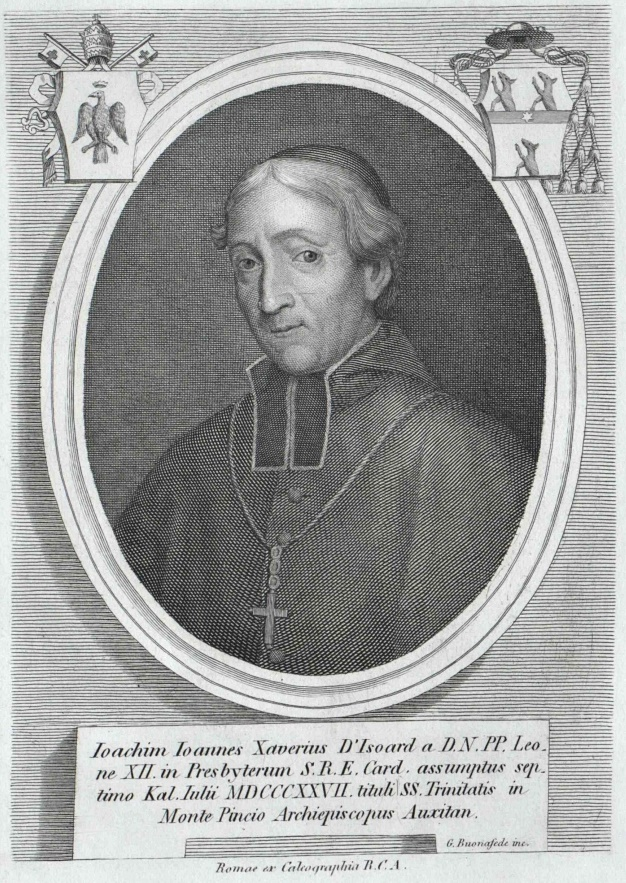
- Archdiocese: Auch
- Installed: 1828
- Term ended: 1839
- Predecessor: Louis-François-Auguste de Rohan-Chabot
- Successor: Nicolas-Augustin de la Croix d’Azolette
- Other post: Cardinal-Priest of Santissima Trinità al Monte Pincio
- Previous posts: Cardinal-Priest of San Pietro in Vincoli (1827-1833); Dean of the Roman Rota (1823-1828)

Orders
- Consecration: 11 January 1829 by Jean-Baptiste de Latil
- Created cardinal: 25 June 1827 by Pope Leo XII
- Rank: Cardinal-Priest

Personal details
- Born: October 23, 1766 Aix-en-Provence, France
- Died: October 7, 1839 (aged 72) Paris, France
- Buried: Auch
- Motto: Lux nostris hostibus ignis

Joachim-Jean-Xavier d'Isoard (23 October 1766 – 7 October 1839) was a French bishop and cardinal.

== Biography ==
He was born in Aix-en-Provence to a noble family as the younger of two brothers. His father died early and he was sent to the minor seminary of Aix, where he became friends with Joseph Fesch, the uncle of Napoleon Bonaparte, but did not finish his ecclesiastical studies. During the Reign of Terror, he sought asylum in Italy at the court of future Louis XVIII in 1794, but returned to France in the same year. After the coup of 18 Fructidor, he was again forced to flee to Italy. Returning after Napoleon established the Consulate, he accompanied Fesch, meanwhile French ambassador to the Pope, to Rome, and was appointed auditor of the Roman Rota at his instigation in 1803.

France occupied and annexed the Papal States in 1809 and took Pius VII as their prisoner, exiling him. D'Isoard followed the pope into French exile and refused several offices Napoleon offered him, including that of a senator. The Pope was freed by the coalition towards the end of Napoleons' reign in 1814, and d'Isoard likewise returned to work at the Roman Rota. During the Hundred Days, he briefly also was named French chargé d'affaires to the Holy See.

Louis XVIII, now truly king, intended to get Louis-Siffren-Joseph de Salamon to be appointed as an auditor of the Rota, replacing d'Isoard, but the Curia rejected these attempts.

In 1823, d'Isoard became Dean of the Roman Rota. He was created a cardinal by Pope Leo XII in the consistory of June 25, 1827 and became cardinal-priest of S. Pietro in Vincoli. Later on, in 1833, he was transferred to the titular church of SS. Trinità al Monte Pincio, which is typically given to a French cardinal.

He was chosen as archbishop of the archdiocese of Auch in south-western France in 1828, and ordained a bishop on January 11, 1829, in Paris by Cardinal Jean-Baptiste de Latil, archbishop of Reims. He was appointed pair of France by Charles X on 24 Jan 1829 and known to be a monarchist. During his time as archbishop of Auch, as a cardinal he participated in the conclaves that elected Pius VIII and Gregory XVI, being charged with possibly pronouncing a French veto in the latter. Having rejected the archepiscopal seat of Aix twice, and of Bordeaux, he eventually accepted to become archbishop of Lyon in 1839, as successor of Cardinal Fesch, mainly because the climate there was more favourable to his decreasing health. He travelled to Paris prior to taking office in Lyon, and died there on 7 October 1839, of a thorax inflammation. He was buried in the cathedral of Auch.
