= Jakob Griesinger =

Blessed Jakob Griesinger O.P.
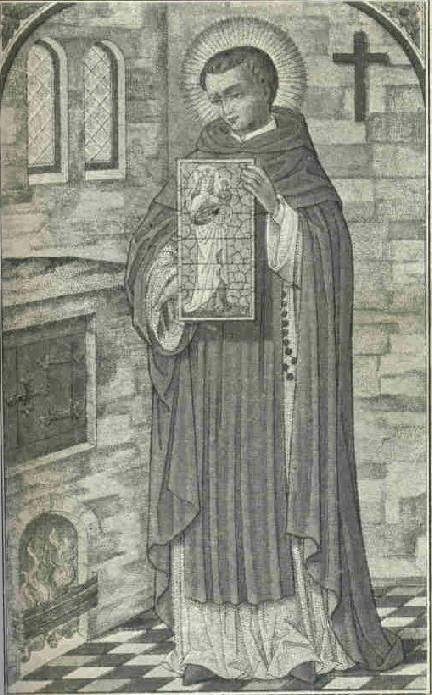
- Devotional print.

Religious
- Born: c. 1407; Ulm, Swabia, Holy Roman Empire
- Died: 11 October 1491 (aged 84); Bologna, Papal States
- Venerated in: Roman Catholic Church
- Beatified: 3 August 1825, Saint Peter's Basilica, Papal States by Pope Leo XII
- Feast: 11 October
- Attributes: Dominican habit
- Patronage: Ulma; Glass painters; Stained glass workers

Jakob Griesinger (c. 1407 – 11 October 1491) was a German Roman Catholic professed religious from the Order of Preachers and a former soldier. Griesinger served in the Italian province of Campania as a soldier to the duke and later became disillusioned with such a life before turning to a sudden call to the religious life to which he dedicated the remainder of his life.

Griesinger's beatification received approval from Pope Leo XII on 3 August 1825.

== Life ==
Jakob Griesinger was born around 1407 in Swabia as the second child of Theodoric.

Griesinger became a soldier in Naples in 1432 after having stopped in Bologna and then going on a pilgrimage to Rome in Lent to visit the tombs of Simon Peter and Paul the Apostle - he enlisted due to not having enough funds to go back home. He soon became disillusioned with his life there and spent time as the private aid to a solicitor in Capua from 1437 when he exited until 1441. He became a member of the Order of Preachers in Bologna in 1441 after having visited the basilica there. He spent the remainder of his life working in the art of stained glass and painting images on church windows.

He died on 11 October 1491 and was buried in the Basilica of San Domenico. His remains were later relocated in 1965 in the same church to another chapel.

=== Beatification ===
Griesinger's beatification received confirmation from Pope Leo XII on 3 August 1825.
