= Maddalena Panattieri =

Blessed Maddalena Panattieri OP
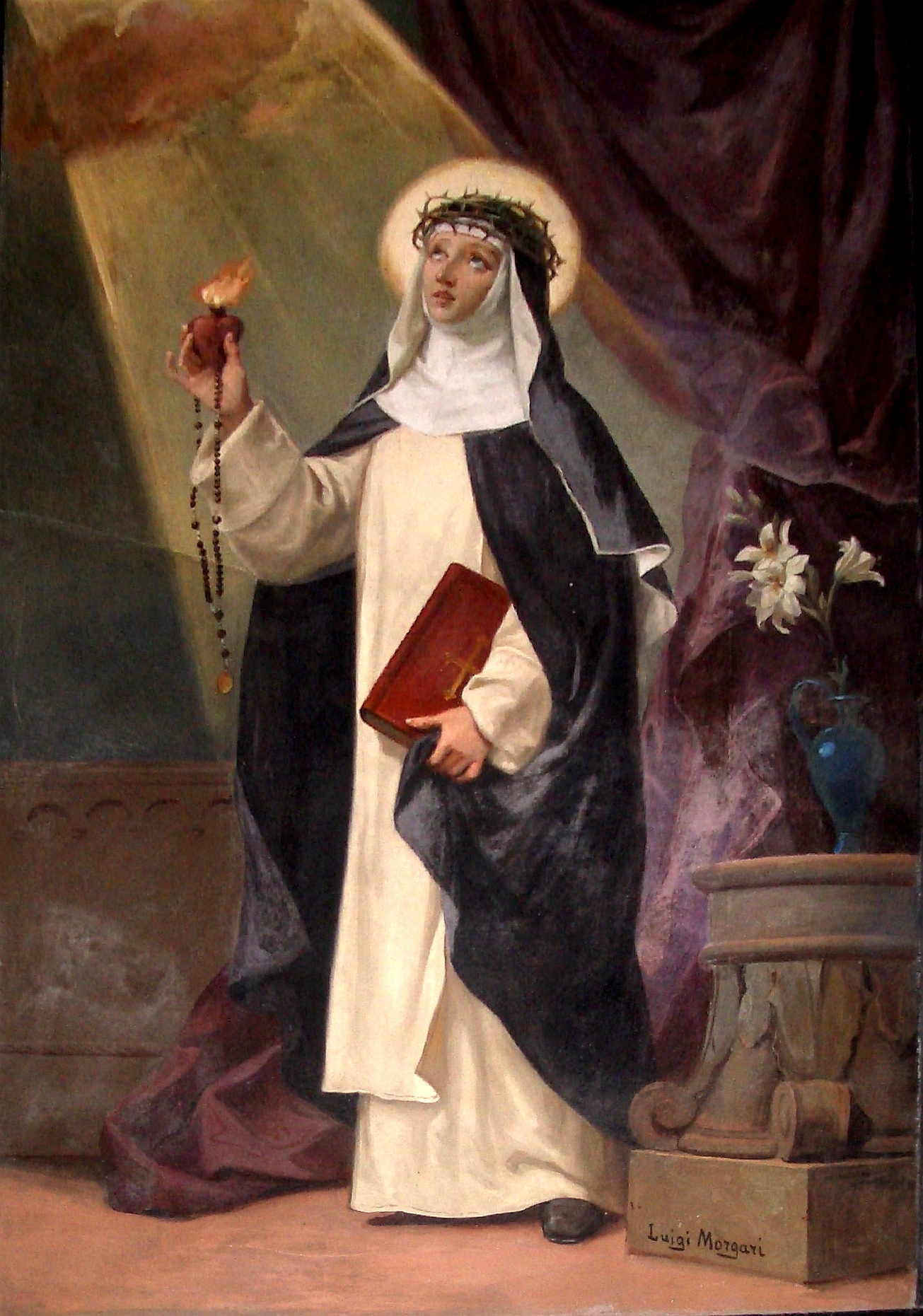

Virgin
- Born: 1443; Trino, Vercelli, Duchy of Savoy
- Died: 13 October 1503 (aged 60); Trino, Vercelli, Duchy of Savoy
- Venerated in: Roman Catholic Church
- Beatified: 26 September 1827, Saint Peter's Basilica by Pope Leo XII
- Feast: 13 October
- Attributes: Dominican habit, heart in flames, rosary, crown of thorns, book of hours, white lilies

Maddalena Panattieri, OP (1443 – 13 October 1503) was an Italian Sister of Penance of Saint Dominic. Panattieri was a stigmatic and received visions during her life with one in particular being the French invasion of the Italian peninsula. She served as a catechist to children and was noted for her simple existence.

Panattieri was beatified on 26 September 1827 after Pope Leo XII confirmed that there was a longstanding popular devotion to the late religious.

== Life ==
Maddalena Panattieri was born in Trino in 1443 and, as a child fostered a great devotion to Catherine of Siena. She made a private vow as a child to remain chaste and joined the Order of Preachers not long before 1463 as part of the Dominican tertiaries; this was considered unusual since members were mainly widows and older women.

Panattieri lived at home alongside her relations and devoted her time to the care of both the poor and the ill and she would often give talks to children (she was quite fond of children) while later speaking with priests and nuns. She would instruct these children in catechism which led to older people flocking to hear her speak on the subject. Panattieri also received the stigmata later in life though she kept this a secret. The reform movement of Raymond of Capua of the order saw the religious promote it in Trino. God also revealed to her the coming French invasion of the Italian peninsula though she would not live to see it.

She often spent her mornings in Eucharistic adoration while her afternoons saw her administering to both the ill and the poor; she became noted for her austerities which included wearing a rough woolen shirt and for her long fasts. When her brother kept getting into trouble (and his conduct exceeded all patience) she would fall to her knees before a crucifix and would beg for God to intervene and help her brother. Through her efforts the order was inspired to undertake a more strict observance which led to Sebastian Maggi - from Milan - coming in 1490 to inaugurate this at her request.

On one occasion a rich councilor from Milan - who harbored great hatred towards the faith - was excommunicated and he hit her across the face in public and called her names. She dropped to her knees and said: "Brother here is the other cheek. I give it to you in love of Jesus Christ" which infuriated the man further. But justice was too late for the man died a violent death from a painful and incurable disease not long after this incident.

Panattieri died on 13 October 1503 in Trino. On her deathbed she said: "I could not be happy in Heaven if you were not there too" to those assembled near her bedside. She sang "Jesus our Redeemer" and the "Ave Maria" before her death. Her remains were found in 1964 and transferred in 1970.

== Beatification ==
Panattieri was beatified by Pope Leo XII on 26 September 1827.
