= Ippolito Galantini (teacher) =

Blessed Ippolito Galantini
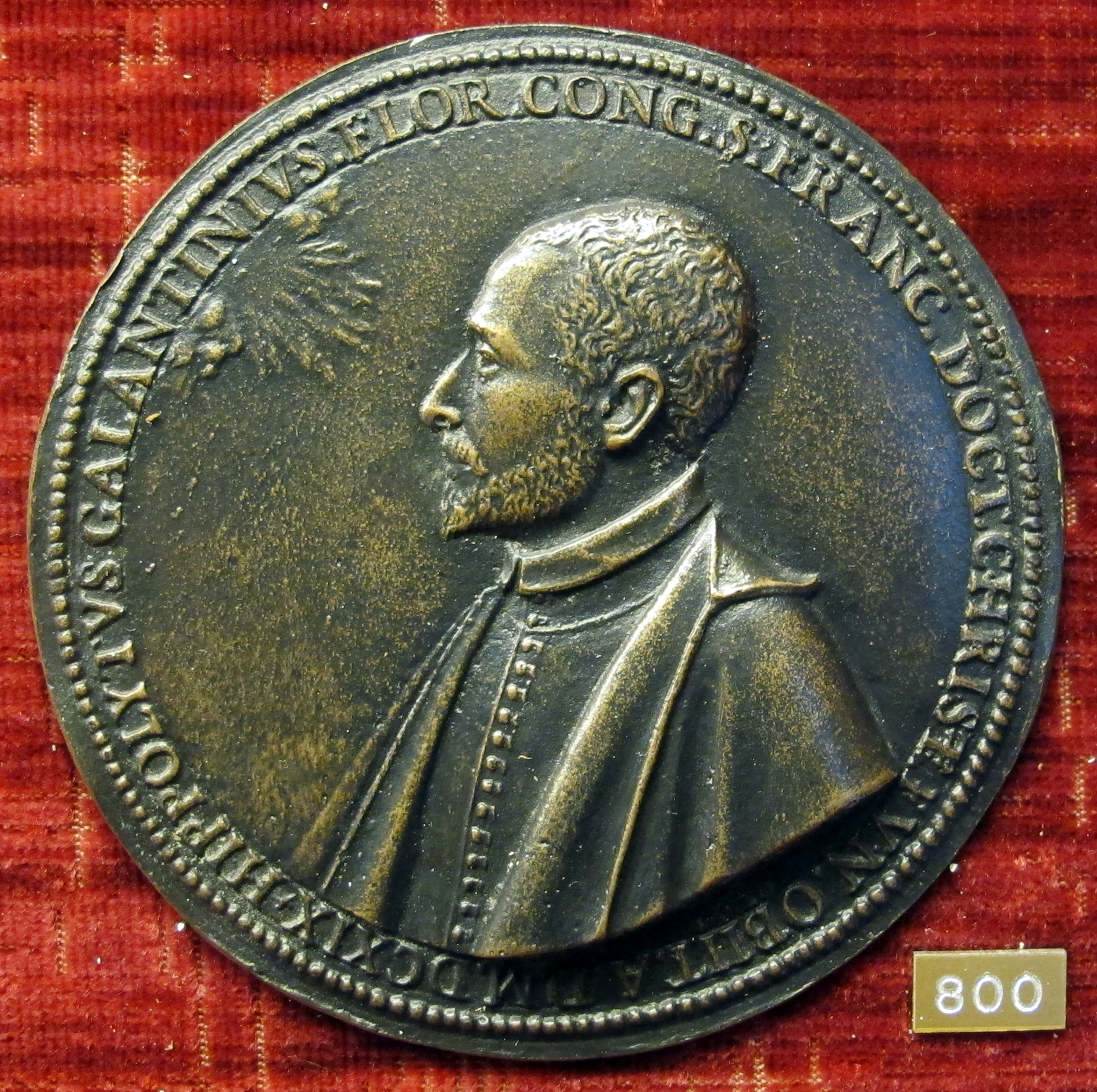
- Florentine medal with the portrait of Ippolito Galantini
- Born: 14 October 1565; Florence, Duchy of Florence
- Died: 20 March 1619 (aged 53); Florence, Grand Duchy of Tuscany
- Venerated in: Roman Catholic Church
- Beatified: 19 June 1825, Saint Peter's Basilica, Papal States by Pope Leo XII
- Feast: 20 March

Ippolito Galantini (14 October 1565 – 20 March 1619) was an Italian Roman Catholic and the founder of the Congregation of Christian Doctrine. Galantini became a noted educator in Florence and Pope Leo XI dubbed Galantini as the "Apostle of Florence" due to his activism in educational affairs. He was subject to malicious attacks, even one failed assassination attempt, and was once accused of harboring heretical views though was exonerated from all charges.

== Life ==
Ippolito Galantini was born in Florence on 12 October 1565 to a poor silk weaver. In his childhood he was charismatic and instructed fellow children in catechism. He wanted to be able to enter the religious life but this never would eventuate.

In 1577 he attracted the attention of the then-Archbishop of Florence Alessandro Ottaviano de' Medici, the future Pope Leo XI, who later bestowed upon him the church of Santa Lucia al Prato for him to work in and to continue his educational pursuits in. But he also dabbled in silk weaving - like his father - while juggling his educational obligations. In 1582 he asked for admittance into the Order of Friars Minor Capuchin but was rejected on the grounds of poor health and he decided instead to found an educational movement.

He taught at a Jesuit church. The educational institution he established in 1604 would forever alter the Florentine educational institution and he was soon asked to travel to other places to establish his educational institute in those places. There were those who were jealous and malicious towards him and some accused him of sharing the views of Martin Luther and thus branded him as schismatic. There was an assassination attempt planned but this failed to kill him. He was also accused of harboring heretical statements but was exonerated of these charges due to the charge being deemed false. In 1602 various benefactors made it possible for him to establish a chapel that Pope Clement VIII requested be named in honor of Saint Francis of Assisi. He made a pilgrimage to Loreto towards the end of his life to put his movement under the intercession of the Blessed Virgin Mary. He died in Florence on 20 March 1619.

=== Beatification ===
Pope Benedict XIV confirmed Galantini's heroic virtue in 1756 and named him as venerable. Pope Leo XII beatified Galantini in Saint Peter's Basilica on 19 June 1825.
