= Cardinals created by Leo XII =

Catholic appointments from 1824 to 1828

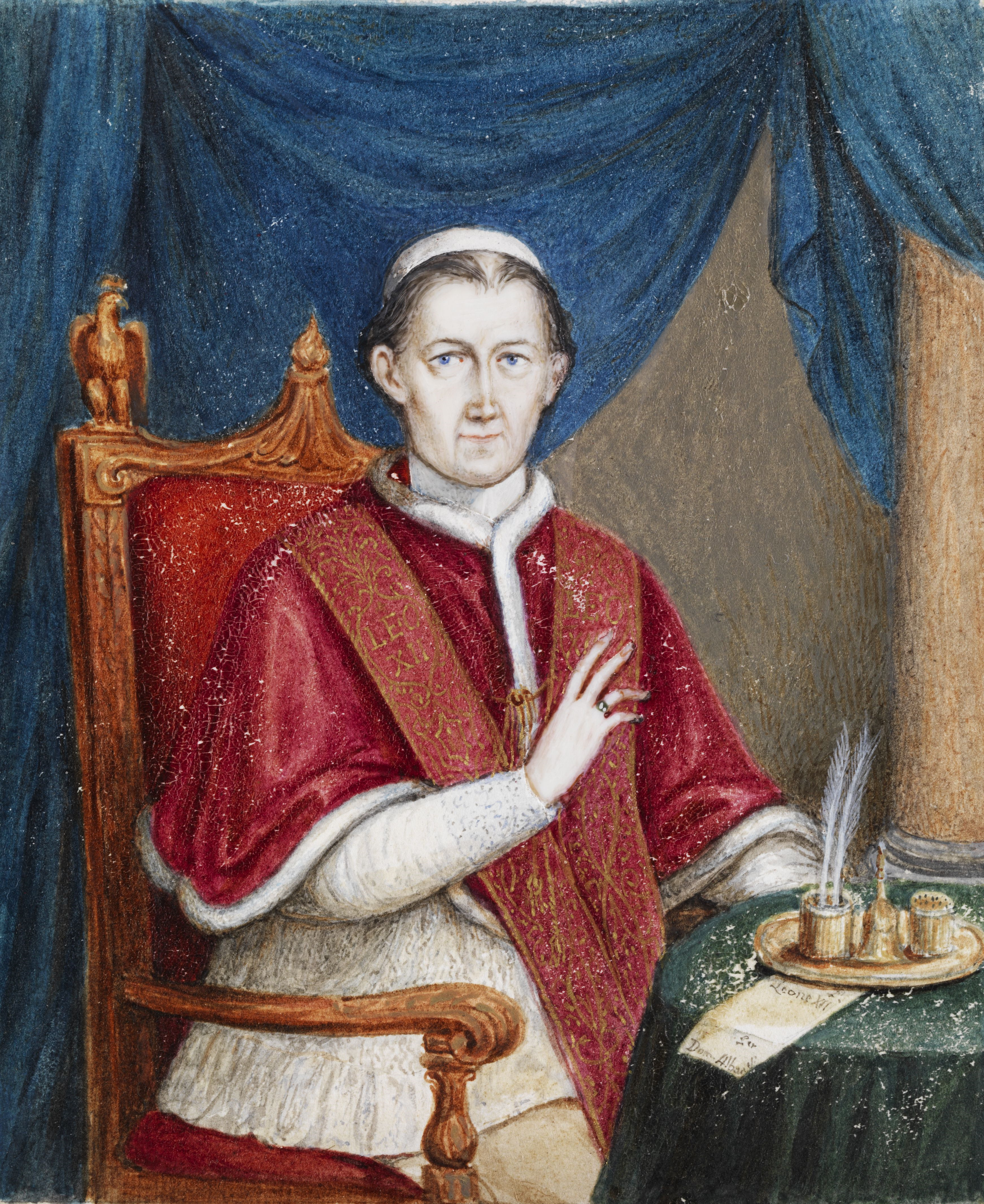
Pope Leo XII (1760-1829).

Pope Leo XII (1823–1829) created 25 cardinals in eight consistories:

== 3 May 1824 ==
Both the new cardinals received their titles on 24 May 1824

1. Giovanni Battista Bussi, archbishop-elect of Benevento – cardinal-priest of S. Pancrazio, died 31 January 1844
2. Bonaventura Gazzola, bishop of Montefiascone – cardinal-priest of S. Bartolomeo all'Isola, died 29 January 1832

== 27 September 1824 ==
1. Carlo Gaetano Gaisruck, archbishop of Milan – cardinal-priest of S. Marco (received the title on 21 May 1829), died 19 November 1846
2. Patrício da Silva, O.E.S.A., patriarch of Lisbon – cardinal-priest without the title, died 3 January 1840
3. Teresio Maria Carlo Vittorio Ferrero della Marmora – cardinal-priest without the title, died 30 December 1830

== 20 December 1824 ==
1. Pedro Inguanzo y Rivero, archbishop of Toledo – cardinal-priest of S. Tommaso in Parione (received the title on 28 February 1831), died 30 January 1836
2. Ludovico Micara, O.F.M.Cap. (in pectore, published on 13 March 1826) – cardinal-priest of SS. IV Coronati (received the title on 3 July 1826), then cardinal-bishop of Frascati (21 October 1837), cardinal-bishop of Ostia e Velletri (17 June 1844), died 24 May 1847

== 21 March 1825 ==
1. Gustave Maximilien Juste de Croÿ-Solre, archbishop of Rouen – cardinal-priest of S. Sabina (received the title on 21 May 1829), died 1 January 1844
2. Bartolomeo Alberto Cappellari, O.S.B.Cam., vicar general of the Order of St. Benedict Camaldolese (created in pectore, published on 13 March 1826) – cardinal-priest of S. Callisto (received the title on 3 July 1826), became Pope Gregory XVI on 2 February 1831, died 1 June 1846

== 13 March 1826 ==
1. Jean-Baptist-Marie-Anne-Antoine de Latil, archbishop of Reims – cardinal-priest of S. Sisto (received the title on 21 May 1829), died 1 December 1839
2. Francisco Javier de Cienfuegos y Jovellanos, archbishop of Seville – cardinal-priest of S. Maria del Popolo (received the title on 28 February 1831), died 21 June 1847

== 2 October 1826 ==
1. Pietro Caprano, titular archbishop of Iconium, secretary of the S.C. Propaganda Fide (created in pectore, published on 15 December 1828) – cardinal-priest of SS. Nereo ed Achilleo (received the title on 21 May 1829), died 24 February 1834
2. Alexander Rudnay, archbishop of Esztergom (created in pectore, published on 15 December 1828) – cardinal-priest without the title, †13 September 1831
3. Giacomo Giustiniani, archbishop of Imola, nuncio in Spain – cardinal-priest of SS. Marcellino e Pietro (received the title on 17 September 1827), then cardinal-bishop of Albano (22 November 1839), died 24 February 1843
4. Vincenzo Macchi, titular archbishop of Nisibis, nuncio in France – cardinal-priest of SS. Giovanni e Paolo (received the title on 25 June 1827), then cardinal-bishop of Palestrina (14 December 1840), cardinal-bishop of Porto e S. Rufina e Civitavecchia (22 January 1844), cardinal-bishop of Ostia e Velletri (11 June 1847), died 30 September 1860
5. Giacomo Filippo Fransoni, titular archbishop of Nazianzo, nuncio in Portugal – cardinal-priest of S. Maria in Aracoeli (received the title on 23 June 1828), then cardinal-priest of S. Lorenzo in Lucina (28 September 1855), died 20 April 1856
6. Benedetto Barberini (created in pectore, published on 15 December 1828) – cardinal-priest of S. Maria sopra Minerva (21 May 1829), then cardinal-priest of S. Maria in Trastevere (2 July 1832), cardinal-priest of S. Lorenzo in Lucina (16 June 1856), died 10 April 1863
7. Giovanni Antonio Benvenuti, prolegate apostolic in Forli (created in pectore, published on 15 December 1828) – cardinal-priest of SS. Quirico e Giulitta (received the title on 21 May 1829), died 14 November 1838
8. Giovanni Francesco Marazzani Visconti (created in pectore, published on 15 December 1828) – cardinal-priest without the title, died 18 January 1829
9. Tommaso Bernetti, vice-camerlengo of the Holy Roman Church and governor of Rome – cardinal-deacon of S. Cesareo in Palatio (received the title on 25 June 1827), then cardinal-deacon of S. Lorenzo in Damaso (22 January 1844), died 21 March 1852
10. Belisario Cristaldi, treasurer of the Apostolic Camera (created in pectore, published on 15 December 1828) – cardinal-deacon of S. Maria in Portico (received the title on 21 May 1829), died 25 February 1831

== 25 June 1827 ==
All the new cardinals received their titles on 17 September 1827

1. Ignazio Nasalli-Ratti, titular archbishop of Cyrrhus – cardinal-priest of S. Agnese fuori le mura, died 2 December 1831
2. Joachim-Jean-Xavier d'Isoard, dean of the Sacred Roman Rota – cardinal-priest of S. Pietro in Vincoli, then cardinal-priest of SS. Trinita al Monte Pincio (15 April 1833), died 7 October 1839

== 15 December 1828 ==
All the new cardinals received their titles on 21 May 1829.

1. Antonio Domenico Gamberini, bishop of Orvieto – cardinal-priest of S. Prassede, then cardinal-bishop of Sabina (18 February 1839), died 25 April 1841
2. Juan Francisco Marco y Catalán, vice-camerlengo of the Holy Roman Church and governor of Rome – cardinal-deacon of S. Agata alla Suburra, died 16 March 1841
