= Bernardo Scammacca =

Italian Catholic priest

Blessed Bernardo Scammacca OP
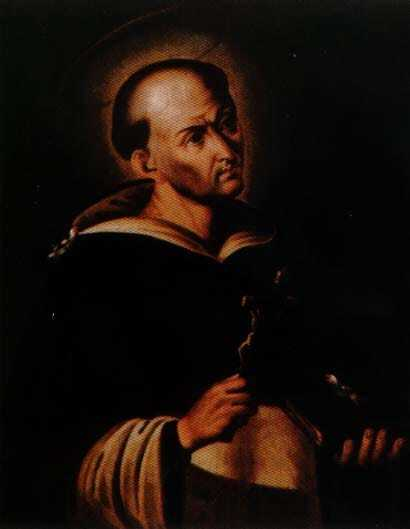

Priest
- Born: 1430; Catania, Kingdom of Sicily
- Died: 11 January 1487 (aged 57); Catania, Kingdom of Sicily
- Venerated in: Roman Catholic Church
- Beatified: 8 March 1825, Saint Peter's Basilica by Pope Leo XII
- Feast: 16 February 11 January (Order of Preachers)

Bernardo Scammacca, OP (1430 – 11 January 1487) was an Italian Catholic priest and member of the Order of Preachers. After leading a dissolute early life, his conversion after a sustaining a wound from a duel led him down the path toward religious life. He became a noted prophet and spent hours in the confessional.

Scammacca was beatified on 8 March 1825 after Pope Leo XII confirmed his 'cultus' (or local devotion).

== Life ==
Bernardo Scammacca was born in 1430 in Catania to upper-class and pious parents.

Scammacca was well-educated in his childhood. Despite his education he spent his adolescence as a wild and dissolute man and during one such revel he received a leg wound in a duel with a man with whom he had quarreled. His subsequent convalescence provided him with adequate time to reflect on what had happened as well as the course his life had taken. This made him realize that he was heading in the wrong direction and needed urgent changes. His healing over time renewed his links to his faith; he approached the Order of Preachers in 1452 in Catania and begged to be admitted into their ranks.

Scammacca became known for his range of charitable works and for his life of repentance for the life he had led, as well as for his strict adherence to the rule of Saint Dominic. He fostered a particular devotion to the Passion of Christ, which sometimes led him into ecstasies. He founded a hospital for the poor, which still exists. He also liked to spend time in the confessional and work as a spiritual director. He had the gift of being a prophet and used that gift to warn others to change their lives. He also prophesied the date of his own death.

Scammacca was named the prior of the convent of Saint Dominic in Catania and later named as the prior of the convent in Palermo. He was also made the vicar general of the reformed Sicilian convents.

It was often said that when he walked in his convent's garden the birds would come and sing to him, but would stop at once when he stopped to reflect. On one occasion a porter was sent to his room to fetch him, and the man saw a bright light under a door. He peeked in to see a child shining with light holding a book that Scammacca was reading from.

Scammacca died in 1487 in Catania. In 1502 it was said that he appeared in a vision to the prior of his convent and asked that his incorrupt remains be relocated the house's chapel. During the translation a man was cured of his paralysis after he touched Scammacca's relics.

== Beatification ==
Scammacca was beatified on 8 March 1825 after Pope Leo XII confirmed his 'cultus' (or popular devotion).
