= Pope Leo XII =

Head of the Catholic Church from 1823 to 1829

- Bishop of Rome
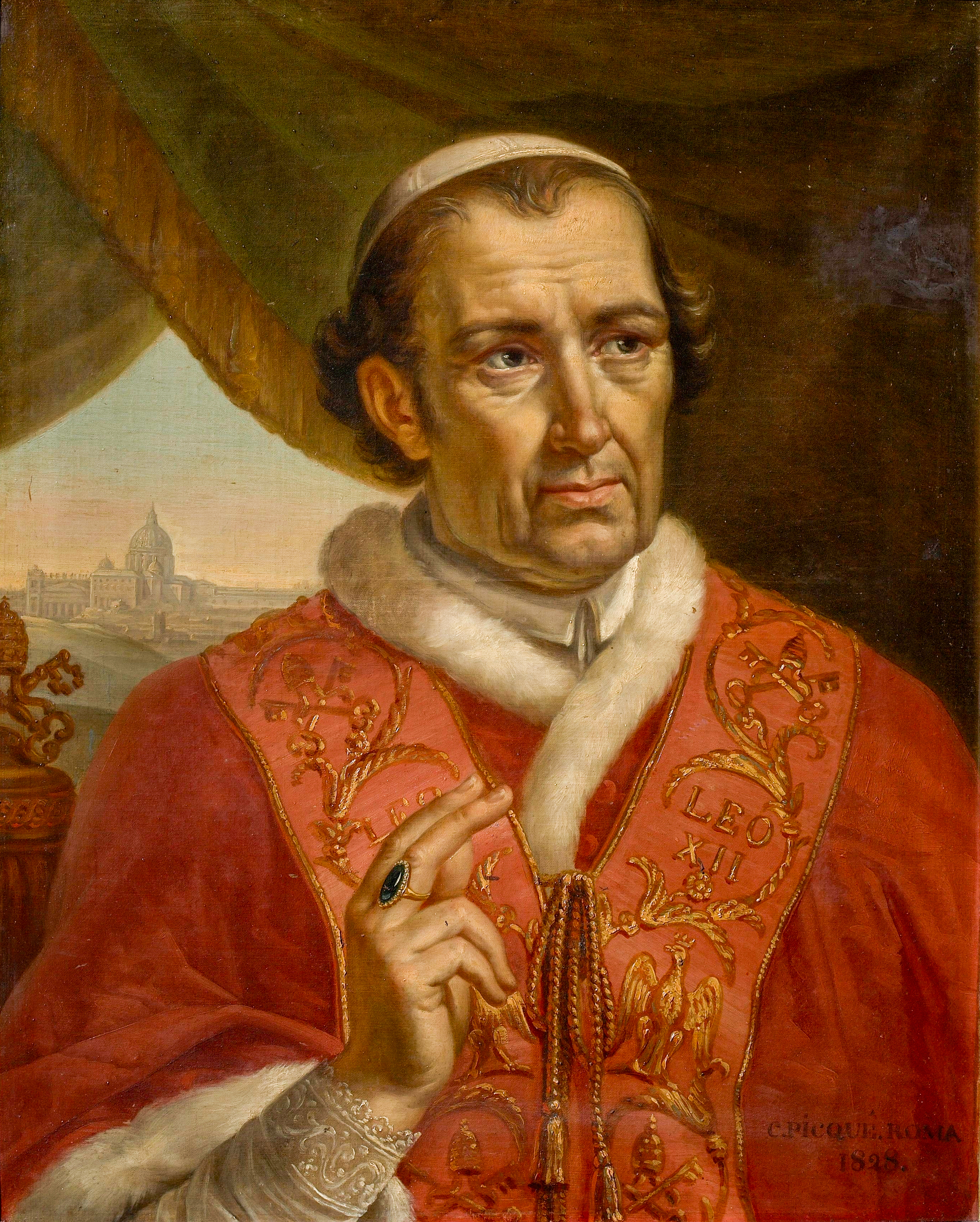
- Portrait by Charles Picqué, 1828
- Church: Catholic Church
- Papacy began: 28 September 1823
- Papacy ended: 10 February 1829
- Predecessor: Pius VII
- Successor: Pius VIII
- Previous posts: Titular Archbishop of Tyre (1794‍–‍1816); Apostolic Nuncio to Germany (1794‍–‍1804); Archbishop-Bishop of Senigallia (1816); Cardinal Priest of Santa Maria in Trastevere (1816‍–‍1823); Prefect of the Roman Curia (1820‍–‍1823); Prefect of the Congregation of Ecclesiastical Immunity (1820‍–‍1823); Archpriest of the Basilica di Santa Maria Maggiore (1821‍–‍1823); Vicar General of Rome (1821‍–‍1823)

Orders
- Ordination: 4 June 1783 by Marcantonio Colonna
- Consecration: 24 February 1794 by Henry Benedict Stuart
- Created cardinal: 8 March 1816 by Pius VII

Personal details
- Born: Annibale Francesco Clemente Melchiorre Girolamo Nicola della Genga; 2 August 1760 Genga, Papal States
- Died: 10 February 1829 (aged 68) Rome, Papal States
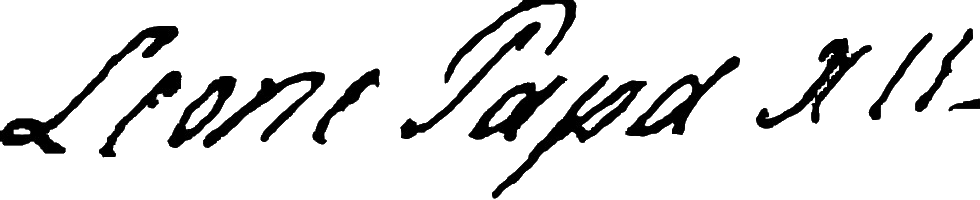
- Signature: Leo XII's signature

- Coat of arms: Leo XII's coat of arms

Pope Leo XII (Italian: Leone XII; born Annibale Francesco Clemente Melchiorre Girolamo Nicola della Genga; 2 August 1760 – 10 February 1829) was head of the Catholic Church and leader of the Papal States from 28 September 1823 to his death in February 1829.

Leo XII was in ill health from the time of his election to the papacy to his death less than six years later, though he was noted for enduring pain well. He was a deeply conservative leader, who enforced many controversial laws, including one forbidding Jews to own property. Though he raised taxes, the Papal States remained financially poor.

== Biography ==
=== Family ===
Della Genga was born in 1760 at the Castello della Genga in the territory of Fabriano to an old noble family from Genga, a small town in the March of Ancona, part of the Papal States. He was the sixth of ten children born to Count Ilario della Genga and Maria Luisa Periberti di Fabriano, and he was the uncle of Gabriele della Genga Sermattei, who in the 19th century was the only nephew of a pope to be elevated to cardinal.

=== Education and ordination ===
Della Genga studied theology at the Collegio Campana in Osimo from 1773 to 1778 and later at the Collegio Piceno in Rome until 1783 when he commenced studies at the Pontifical Academy of Ecclesiastical Nobles. He later received the subdiaconate in 1782 and then the diaconate and was ordained to the priesthood on 14 June 1783; he received the latter two from Cardinal Marcantonio Colonna.

=== Papal nuncio and episcopate ===
In 1790 the attractive and articulate della Genga attracted favourable attention by a tactful oration commemorative of the late Joseph II, Holy Roman Emperor. In 1794 Pope Pius VI made him a canon of Saint Peter's Basilica, and in 1793 created him Titular Archbishop of Tyre. He was consecrated in Rome in 1794 after the appointment and was despatched to Lucerne as the Apostolic Nuncio to Switzerland. In 1794 he was transferred to the Apostolic Nunciature to Cologne, but owing to the war had to make his residence in Augsburg. At this time, he believed it would be his last post and organized the construction of tombs for his mother and for himself.

During the dozen or more years he spent in Germany he was entrusted with several honourable and difficult missions, which brought him into contact with the courts of Dresden, Vienna, Munich and Stuttgart, as well as with Napoleon. It is charged, however, that during this period his finances were disordered, and his private life was not above suspicion.

After the Napoleonic abolition of the States of the Church (1798), he lived for some years at Monticelli Abbey, solacing himself with music and with bird-shooting, pastimes which he continued even after his election as Pope.

=== Cardinal ===
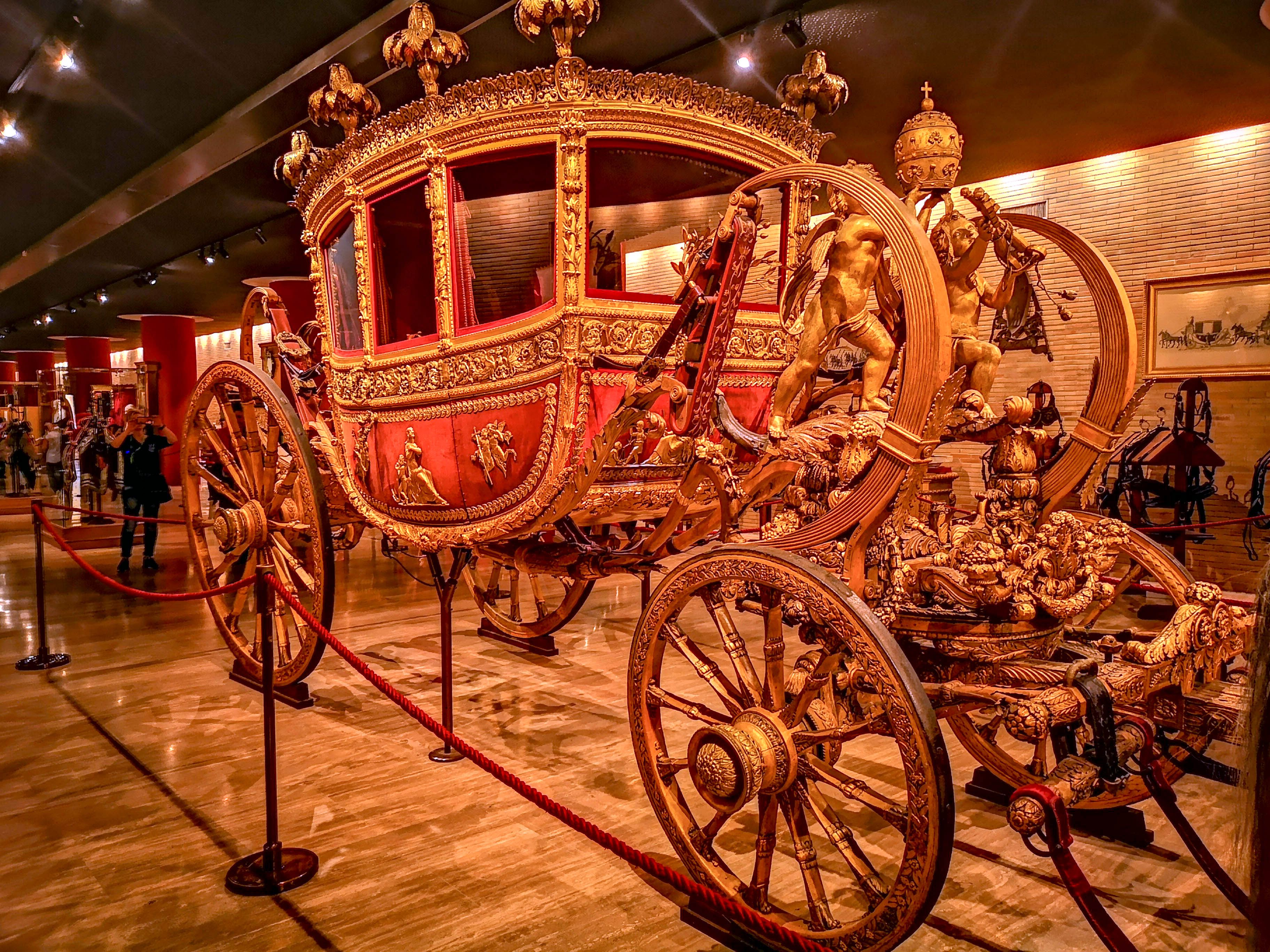
"The Grand Gala Berlin", a luxury carriage constructed in Rome during the first half of the nineteenth century, is an order of the States of the Church during the reign of two pontiffs: Leo XII, in the years 1824–1826, and Gregory XVI, who requested some important modifications. The carriage was used for five solemn festive occasions in the year.

In 1814 della Genga was chosen to carry Pope Pius VII's congratulations to Louis XVIII of France upon his restoration.

On 8 March 1816 he was created Cardinal-Priest of Santa Maria in Trastevere and he received his red zucchetto on 11 March and his titular church on 29 April 1816. Later he was appointed as the Archpriest of the Basilica di Santa Maria Maggiore, and appointed to the episcopal see of Sinigaglia, which he resigned in 1818 for health reasons. He resigned without ever having entered his diocese.

On 9 May 1820, Pope Pius VII gave him the distinguished post of Vicar-General of His Holiness for the Diocese of Rome.

== Pontificate ==
Papal styles of Pope Leo XII
- Reference style: His Holiness
- Spoken style: Your Holiness
- Religious style: Holy Father
- Posthumous style: None

=== Papal election ===
Pope Pius VII died in 1823 after yet another long pontificate that spanned over two decades. In the conclave of 1823, della Genga was the candidate of the zelanti faction and in spite of the active opposition of France, he was elected as the new pope by the cardinals on 28 September 1823, taking the name of Leo XII.

His election had been facilitated because he was thought to be close to death, but he unexpectedly rallied. He had even remarked about his own health to the cardinals, saying that they would be electing "a dead man". It was said in the conclave that he lifted his robes to show the cardinals a pair of swollen and ulcerated legs to deter them, but that made them even more eager to elect him. Before the conclave opened, the Kingdom of the Two Sicilies indicated that it objected to five candidates in the election which included della Genga. While della Genga did not receive a single vote in the first and second ballots, he received seven in the third and then four in the fifth. While it seemed that Cardinal Antonio Gabriele Severoli would prevail on 21 September since he had just below the needed amount, Cardinal Giuseppe Albani interposed the veto on the behalf of the Austrian Empire against Severoli. While it was later indicated that the French court would not be amenable to the election of della Genga, Severoli's voting bloc decided to cast their votes for della Genga, seeing him receive 34 votes to become pope.

Leo XII was 63 at the time of his election and frequently fell victim to infirmities. He was tall and thin with an ascetic look and a melancholic countenance. At this time Vincent Strambi served as bishop for the remainder of the pontificate of Pope Pius VII before his successor Pope Leo XII accepted Strambi's resignation and summoned him to Rome as his advisor. But the sudden illness of the pope – which seemed likely to prove fatal – prompted Strambi to offer his own life to God so that the pope could live. Leo XII rallied to great surprise but Strambi died of a stroke within the week.

So Leo XII fell ill after his coronation but after his recovery, he showed surprising endurance in carrying out his work. Leo XII devoted himself to his work and was simple in his mode of life. He had a passion for shooting birds and was rumored to have killed a peasant with whom he argued about sporting rights.

The cardinal protodeacon Fabrizio Ruffo crowned him as pontiff on 5 October 1823.

=== Foreign policy ===
Pius VII's Cardinal Secretary of State, Ercole Consalvi, who had been della Genga's rival in the conclave, was immediately dismissed, and Pius' policies rejected. Leo XII's foreign policy, entrusted at first to the octogenarian Giulio Maria della Somaglia and then to the more able Tommaso Bernetti, negotiated certain concordats very advantageous to the papacy. Personally most frugal, Leo XII reduced taxes, made justice less costly, and was able to find money for certain public improvements, yet he left the Church's finances more confused than he had found them, and even the elaborate jubilee of 1825 did not really mend financial matters.

With regard to the Spanish American Wars of Independence, he initially displayed a cautious stance of neutrality between the Spanish Empire and the Spanish American Republics, not recognizing them diplomatically, but allowing the priestly Ordination of clergy sympathetic to the independence movements, seeking to avoid explicit declarations against the independentists for fear of anti-clerical policies by the Liberadores in response, as well as an abuse of the patronato real in Spain to pressure the Pope to increase his hostility. But after receiving representatives of the Spanish Court (supported in turn by the Holy Alliance) and also envoys from Gran Colombia proposing a Concordat, he issued opinions against the latter in order to restore tranquility and order to his subjects in those domains, influencing the rejection of the Holy See to the patriotic Armies that they affirm liberal ideologies and the Modernist errors of the Enlightenment (perceived by the Church as heresies) contrary to natural law and the Thomistic Conception of Politics (citing as an example its application in the Dechristianization of France during the French Revolution), as well as considering that the cause of the socio-political disorder in Latin America came from the insurgents with their rebellions against the Legitimate authority and seeking to force the practice of the voluntaristic doctrines of the Social Contract, a work condemned in the Index librorum prohibitorum, which prevented a pacification of the continent in a situation of anarchy since the Napoleonic invasion (This criticism, despite popular rumors, was not influenced by papal sympathies for the traditional Monarchy or any pressure from the Congress of Verona). It was thus that he proclaimed the encyclical Etsi Liam Diu, in continuity with the previous pro-royalist encyclical, Etsi longissimo terrarum, in which he exhorted the Hispanic American clergy "to advise and insist among the faithful to obedience and submission to the legitimate sovereign and mother country," that is, to maintain the Pact with the Hispanic Monarchy intact by inspiring the common population to be faithful vassals and to abjure the "new ideas" of the Hispanic American Enlightenment and its Secularism (especially the threat that nation-states would claim to be the new socio-political rector of the destinies of society, to the detriment of the spiritual supremacy of the Church according to political Augustinianism), as well as to achieve a Reconciliation between Hispanic Americans involved in a fratricidal civil war that threatened to fragment the political ties of Hispanicity. However, due to logistical problems, the document was not delivered to the Spanish Americans until after the Battle of Ayacucho (the wars of independence having already ended in royalist defeat) and the Creole and liberal elites, once they learned of its existence, took the opportunity to accuse the document of being a Spanish forgery (a historiographical controversy that would be resolved with the release of the Vatican Archives by Leo XIII at the end of the century, revealing the original copy).

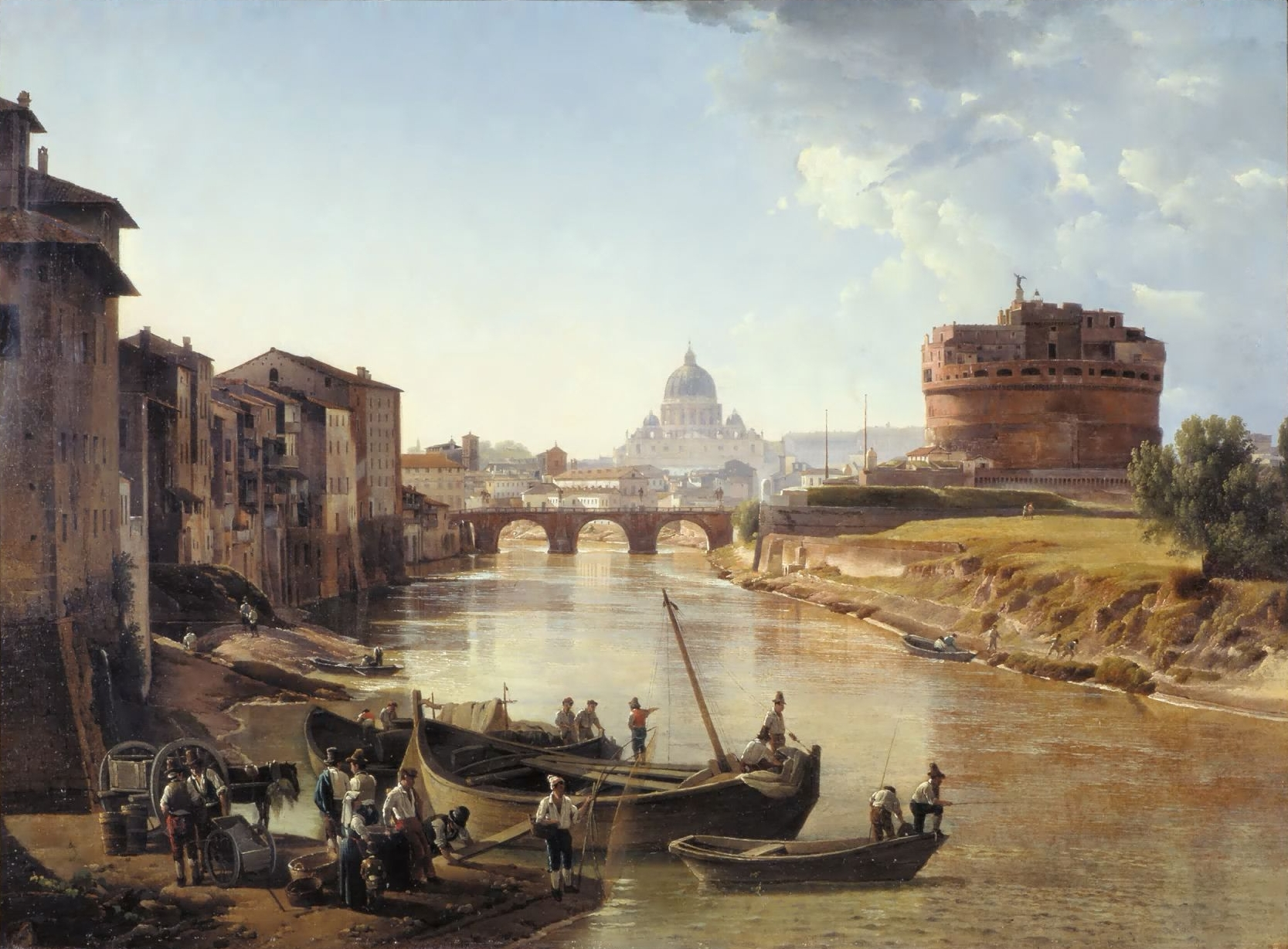
The Tiber with Castel Sant'Angelo, Ponte Sant'Angelo and St. Peter in the time of Leo XII, by Silvestr Feodosievich Shchedrin

=== Domestic policy ===
Leo XII's domestic policy was one of extreme conservatism: "He was determined to change the condition of society, bringing it back to the utmost of his power to the old usages and ordinances, which he deemed to be admirable; and he pursued that object with never flagging zeal." He condemned the Bible societies, and under Jesuit influence reorganised the educational system, placing it entirely under priestly control through his bull Quod divina sapientia and requiring that all secondary instruction be carried out in Latin, as he required of all court proceedings, also now entirely in ecclesiastical hands. All charitable institutions in the Papal States were put under direct supervision.

Laws such as that forbidding Jews to own property and allowing them only the shortest possible time in which to sell what they owned, and that requiring all Roman residents to listen to Catholic catechism commentary, led many of Rome's Jews to emigrate, to Trieste, Lombardy and Tuscany.

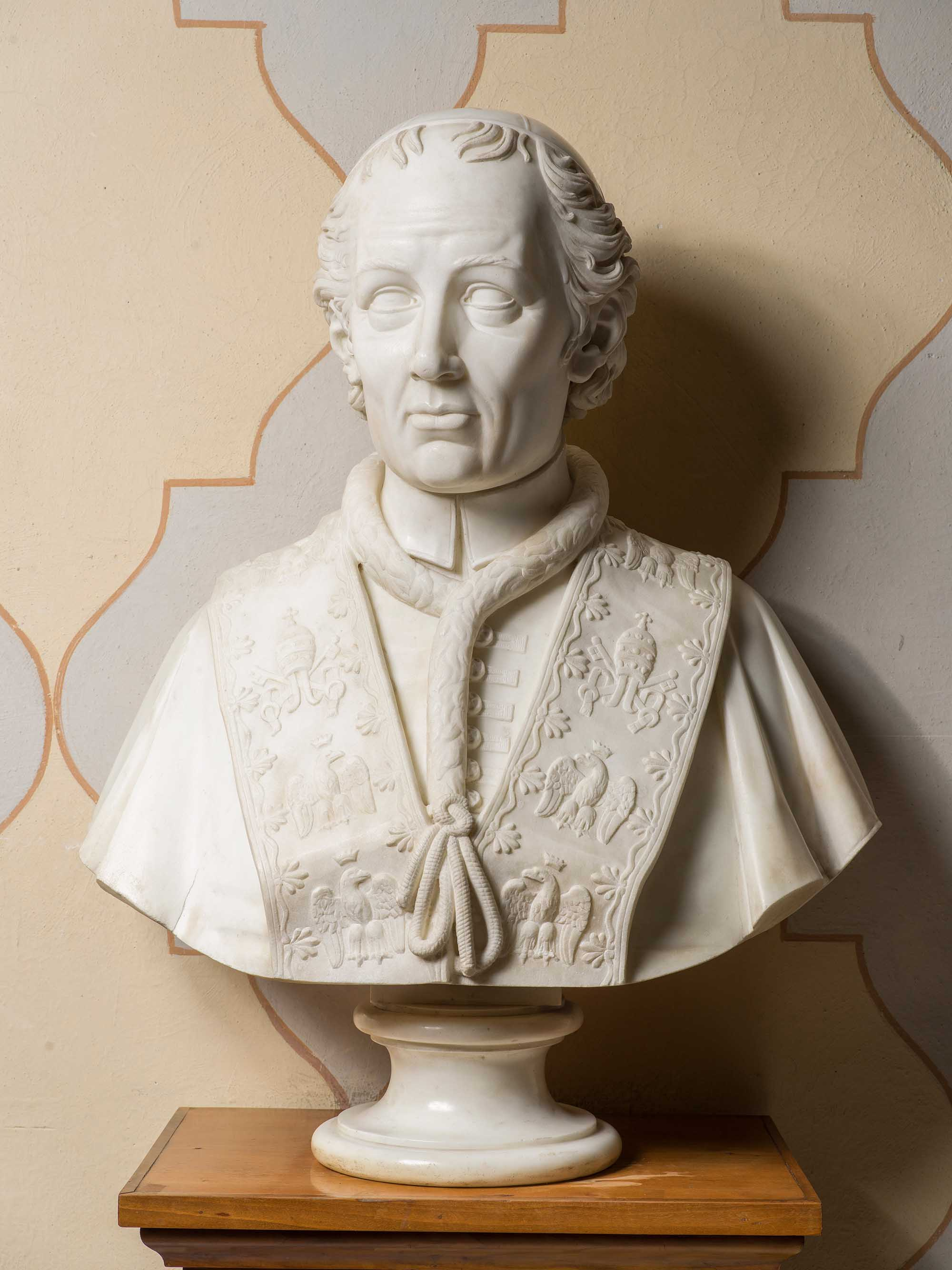
Bust of Pope Leo XII, c. 1820s

"The results of his method of governing his states soon showed themselves in insurrections, conspiracies, assassinations and rebellion, especially in Umbria, the Marches and Romagna; the violent repression of which, by a system of espionage, secret denunciation, and wholesale application of the gibbet and the galleys, left behind it to those who were to come afterwards a very terrible, rankling and long-enduring debt of party hatreds, of political and social demoralisation, and – worst of all – a contempt for and enmity to the law, as such." In a regime that saw the division of the population into Carbonari and Sanfedisti, he hunted down the Carbonari and the Freemasons with their liberal sympathisers.

Leo XII made himself unpopular with the people due to the fact that he constrained them to endless rules that concerned private life and public affairs. He decreed that a dressmaker who sold low or transparent dresses would incur ipso facto excommunication. The pope also denied the Jews the right to possess material possessions and allowed them the shortest time to sell their belongings. He revived the regulations of the Middle Ages in regard to segregation and marks for identification.

While often considered an archconservative Leo XII held a high opinion of the liberal Catholic priest Lamennais having a portrait of him hung in his private chambers. When the latter visited Rome in 1824 Leo offered him a Vatican apartment and in 1828 a cardinalate. According to Cardinal Nicholas Wiseman before the full consistory he said that Lamennais was " a distinguished writer, whose works had not only rendered eminent services to religion, but rejoiced and astonished Europe." However some believe that the quote was actually about the historian John Lingard.

Leo XII had a fascination with archeology. When Jean-François Champollion deciphered the Egyptian hieroglyphs, Leo XII invited him to Rome to study its obelisks. Leo XII later printed and engraved Champollion's work at his personal expense. Champollion later wrote to Cardinal Wiseman that "It is a real service which His Holiness renders to science, and I shall be happy if you will be good enough to place at his feet the homage of my profound acknowledgment.

=== Vaccination controversy ===
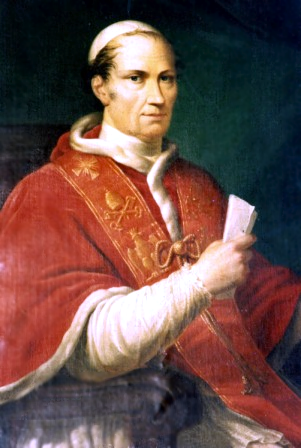
Portrait of Pope Leo XII

According to some contemporary authors such as G. S. Godkin, Leo XII was also said to have prohibited vaccination. More recent scholarship has been unable to find any ban or any suggestion of a ban by Leo XII and his administration. Donald J. Keefe traced a quote by Leo XII which strongly condemned vaccination to "an unverified citation" by Dr. Pierre Simon in Histoire et philosophie du contrôle des naissances. The response of the Papacy to the arrival of vaccination in Italy has been documented in Pratique de la vaccination antivariolique dans les provinces de l’État pontifical au 19ème siècle, an article written by Yves-Marie Bercé and Jean-Claude Otteni for Revue d’Histoire Ecclésiastique. According to Bercé and Otteni, the biographers and contemporaries of Leo XII do not mention any interdict. The authors credit the origin of the mythical vaccination ban of Leo XII to the personality of Cardinal della Genga when he became pope in 1823. His intransigence and piety alienated liberal opinion very quickly. His austere spirituality made him the target of criticisms and mocking remarks. English travelers visiting the peninsula and many of the diplomats established in Rome remarked on the severity of the pontiff.

The absence of a prohibition is evidenced by the fact that in 1828 the Medical-Surgical Society of Bologna was able to implement a vaccination campaign.

=== Activities ===
==== Beatifications and canonizations ====
Leo XII beatified a number of individuals in his pontificate, which totaled at 15. He beatified Angelina di Marsciano and Bernardo Scammacca (8 March 1825), Hippolytus Galantini (29 June 1825), Angelus of Gualdo Tadino (3 August 1825), and Angelus of Acri (18 December 1825). He also beatified in 1825 Julian of Saint Augustine, Alphonsus Rodriguez and Jakob Griesinger. He beatified Imelda Lambertini (20 December 1826) and also confirmed the cultus of Jordan of Saxony in 1826. He also beatified Yolanda of Poland and Maddalena Panattieri on 26 September 1827, as well as Giovanna Soderini (1827) and Elena Duglioli and Juana de Aza (the mother of Saint Dominic) in 1828.

Leo XII also created Peter Damian a Doctor of the Church on 27 September 1828 in addition to the formal canonization he presided over.

==== Saint Vincenzo Strambi ====
He collaborated with Vincent Strambi (future saint) – who served as his advisor. When he was on the brink of death in 1825, Strambi offered himself to God for the survival of the pope. The pope rallied from his ailment, but Strambi died.

==== Religious congregations ====
The pope also approved the Missionary Oblates of Mary Immaculate on 17 February 1826 when he gave the congregation official recognition.

==== Jubilee ====
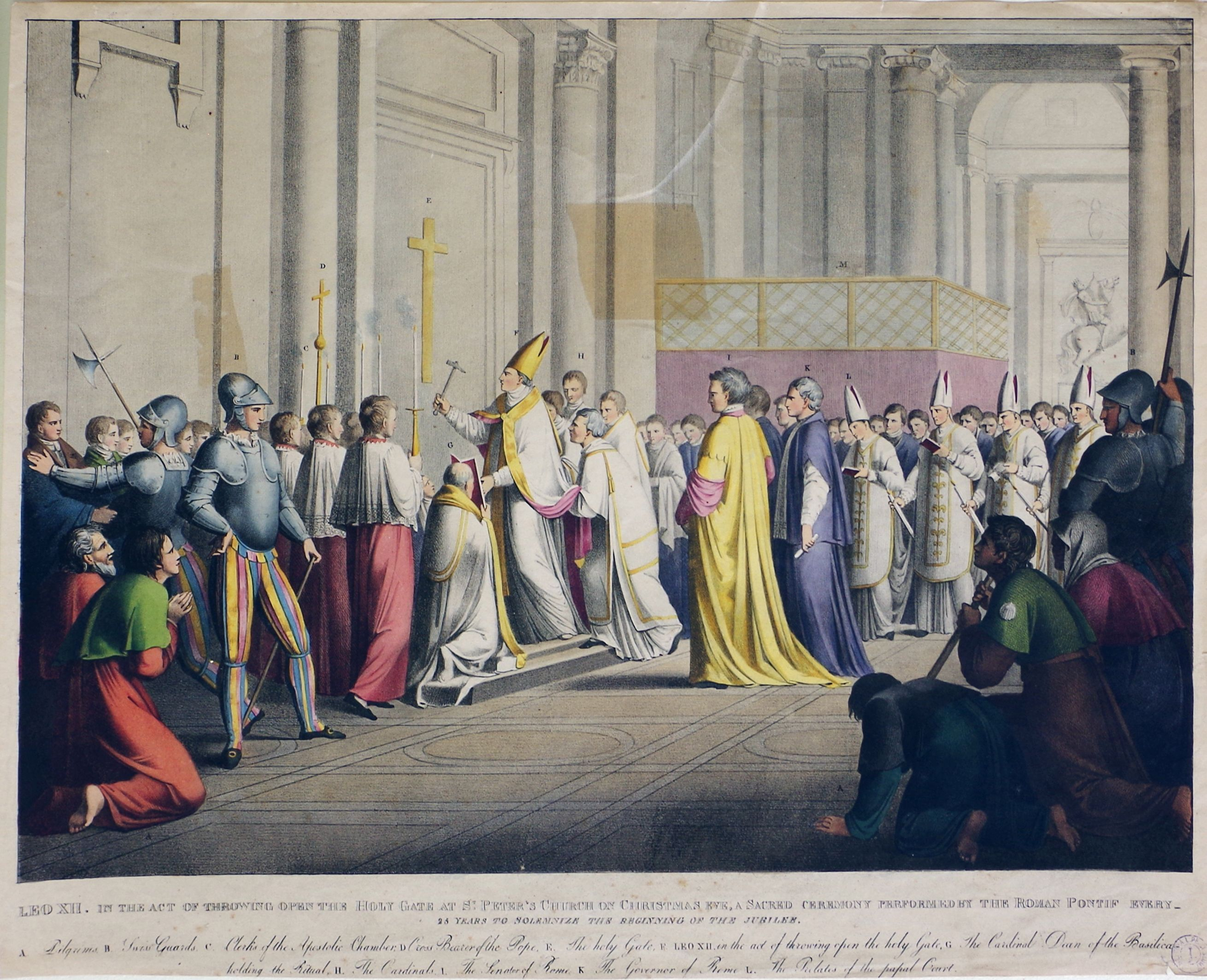
Leo XII opens the holy door to mark the beginning of the Jubilee in 1825.

Leo XII celebrated the jubilee in 1825 in an event that saw more than half a million pilgrims travel to Rome to participate in the solemnities. To mark the event, Leo XII issued the encyclical Quod hoc ineunte on 24 May 1825 that proclaimed the jubilee.

==== Consistories ====
He held 8 consistories in which he elevated 25 new cardinals into the cardinalate. This included Cardinal Bartolomeo Alberto Cappellari – the future Pope Gregory XVI – on 13 March 1826. In addition, Leo XII nominated three cardinals whom he reserved "in pectore" but later revealed.

For the December 1824 allocations, Leo XII considered elevating Félicité de La Mennais despite knowing about his crude character and extreme social and moral positions. Nevertheless, the nomination never occurred, however, other sources allege that he declined the pope's invitation. For the October 1826 allocation, Leo XII had nominated one cardinal in pectore whom he later revealed in 1828, however, several subsequent sources indicate that the renowned English historian John Lingard was also created a cardinal in pectore and simply never announced. In the 1828 consistory, the Bishop of Osimo e Cingoli Timoteo Maria Ascensi was to be made a cardinal but died nine days before the consistory occurred.

== Death and legacy ==
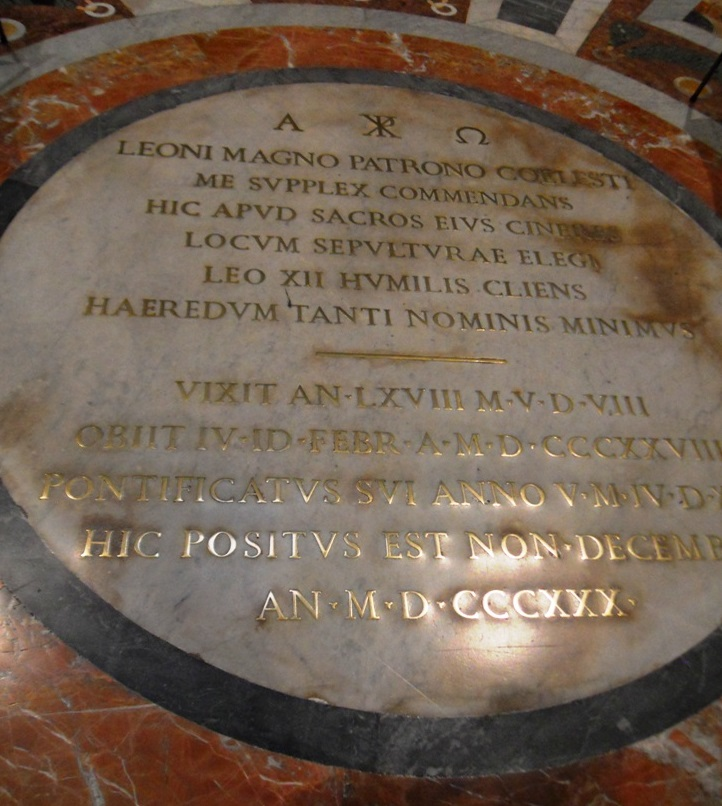
Tomb of Leo XII near the tomb of Saint Leo I per his requests

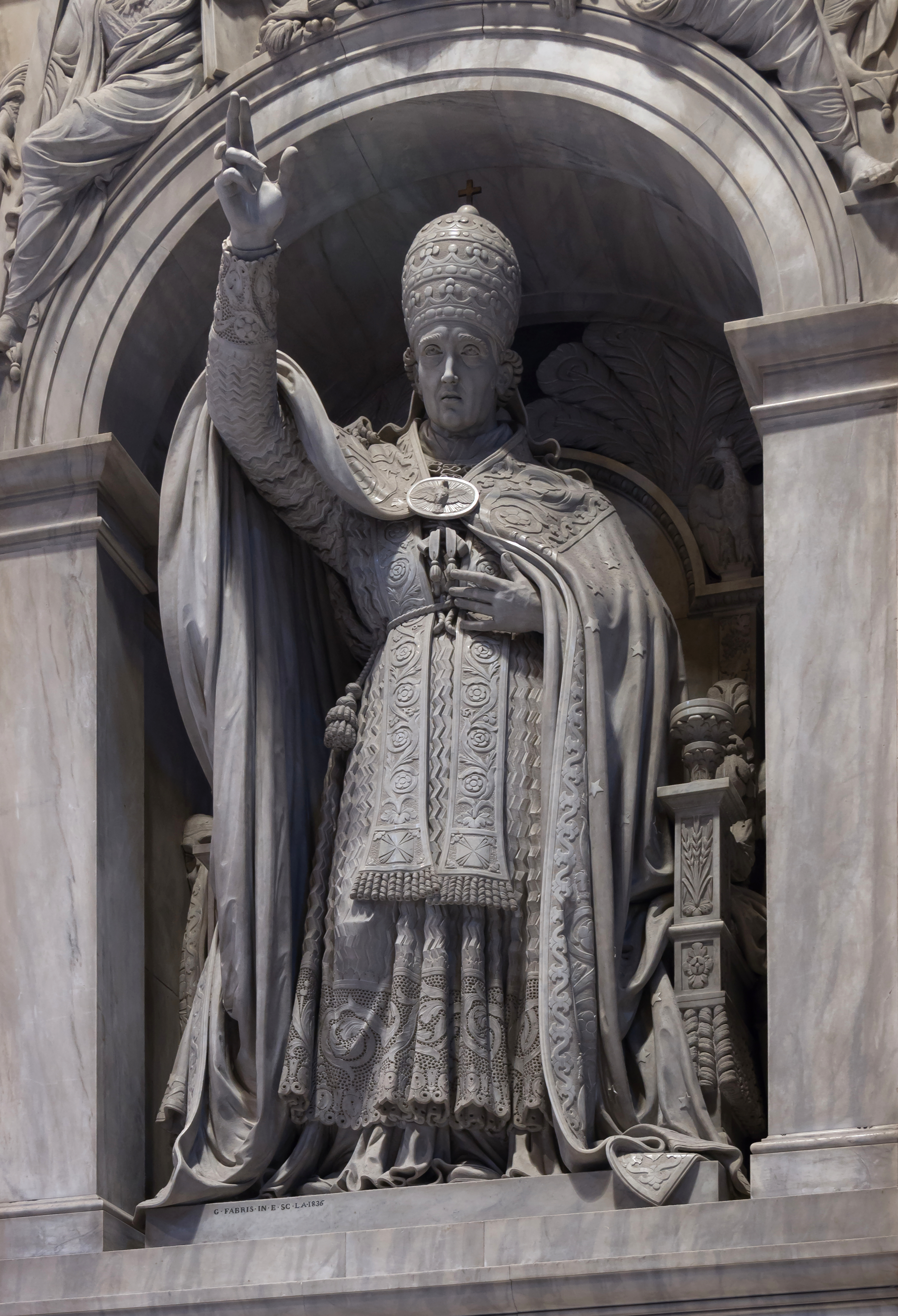
Monument to Leo XII in St. Peter's Basilica

On 5 February 1829, after a private audience with the new Cardinal Secretary of State, Tommaso Bernetti, he was suddenly taken ill and he seemed to know that his end was near. On 8 February, he asked for and received the Viaticum and was anointed. On 9 February, he lapsed into unconsciousness and on the next morning, he died. The minister to Rome for French King Charles X, François-René de Chateaubriand, who was near to the events, wrote: "The pope died of that haemorrhoidal condition to which he was subject. The blood, being carried to the bladder, occasioned a retention which they tried to relieve by means of an incision. It is thought His Holiness was injured by the operation. However it may be, after four days of suffering, Leo XII died this morning at nine as I was arriving at the Vatican, where an agent of the Embassy had spent the night." He was buried in a monument of him in Saint Peter's Basilica on 15 February 1829. His remains were transferred and buried before the altar of Pope Leo I on 5 December 1830.

Leo XII is considered to have been a man of noble character, with a passion for order and efficiency, but one who lacked insight into the temporal developments of his time. His rule was unpopular in Rome and in the Papal States, and by various measures of his reign he diminished greatly for his successors their chances of solving the new problems that confronted them.

=== Rumors of a liaison ===
It was alleged that Leo XII had a liaison as a young prelate with the wife of a Swiss Guard (known as Pfiffer). The allegation was brought to the attention of Pope Pius VI, who met with the prelate to discern the truth of the matter. He refuted all claims to the pope and the matter was dropped then and there save for the fact that della Genga affirmed he was close to Pfiffer.

== Bibliography ==
Leo XII issued at least 6 encyclicals during his reign.

No.	Title (Latin)	Subject	Date	Texts
1.	Ubi primum	On Pope Leo's papacy; on the Bishops' duties	5 May 1824	
2.	Quod Hoc Ineunte	Proclaiming a Universal Jubilee	24 May 1824	
3.	Ad Plurimas	Request for support in the restoration of the burnt-out Basilica of St. Paul outside the walls	25 January 1825	
4.	Charitate Christi	On Extending the Jubilee to the Entire Church	25 December 1825	
5.	Quo Graviora	On Secret Societies	13 March 1826	
6.	Quanta laetitia	Introduction of a regular hierarchy in Scotland	13 February 1827	

== See also ==
- Cardinals created by Leo XII
- List of popes

== Sources ==
- Boutry, Philippe (2002). "Leo XII". In Levillain, Philippe; O'Malley, John W. (eds.). The Papacy, An Encyclopedia. Vol. 2: Gaius-Proxies. Routledge. pp. 929–933.

Catholic Church titles
Unknown Last known title holder: Vincenzo Ranuzzi	Titular Archbishop of Tyre; 21 February 1794 – 8 March 1816	Succeeded by Giacomo Giustiniani
Preceded by Giulio Gabrielli	Archbishop of Senigallia; 8 March 1816 – 18 September 1816	Succeeded by Fabrizio Sceberras Testaferrata
Preceded by Giovanni Gallarati Scotti	Archpriest of the Basilica di Santa Maria Maggiore; 10 February 1818 – 28 September 1823	Succeeded by Benedetto Naro
Preceded by Pius VII	Pope; 28 September 1823 – 10 February 1829	Succeeded by Pius VIII
