= Charles Picqué (painter) =

Belgian painter (1799–1869)

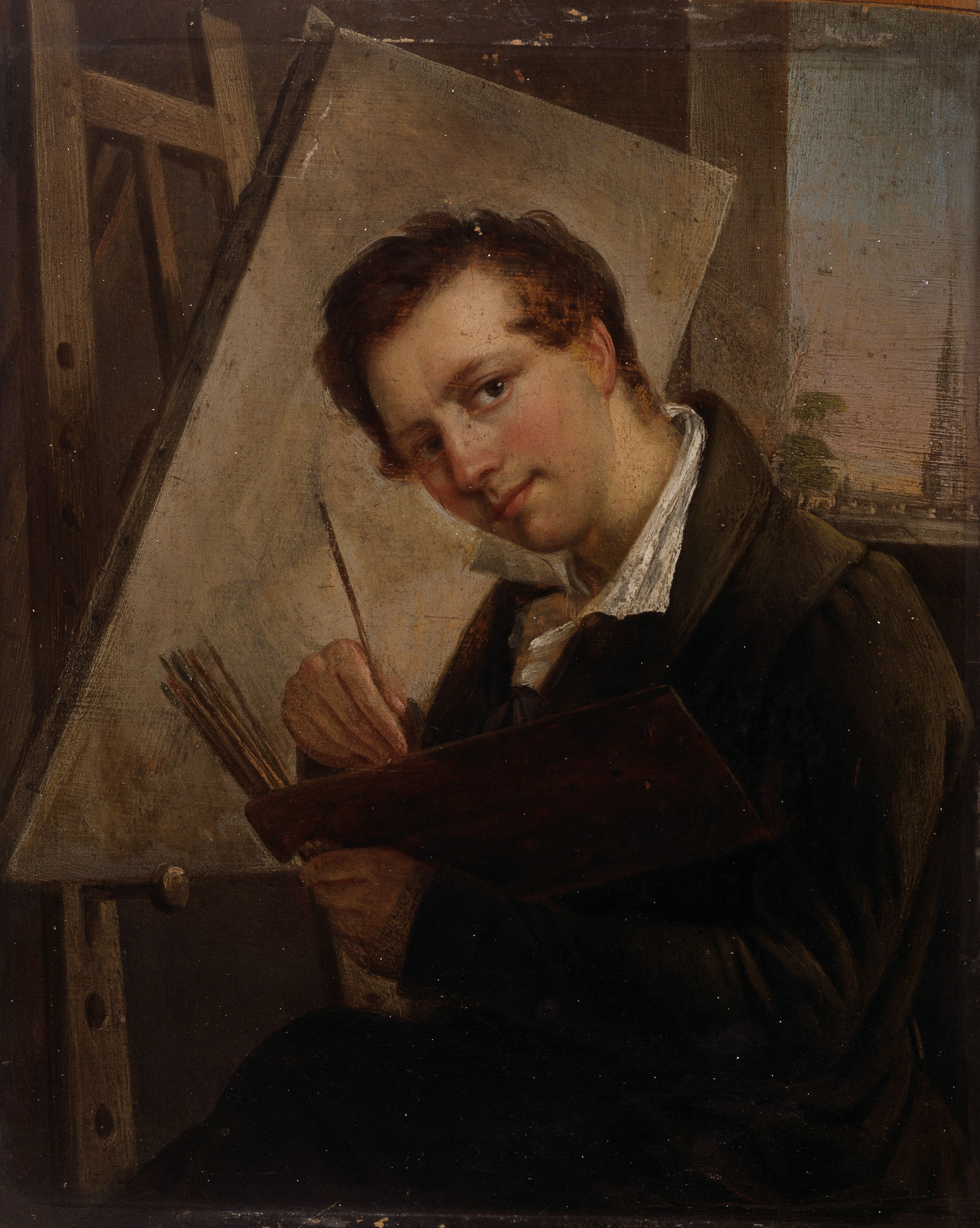
Self-portrait, c. 1833

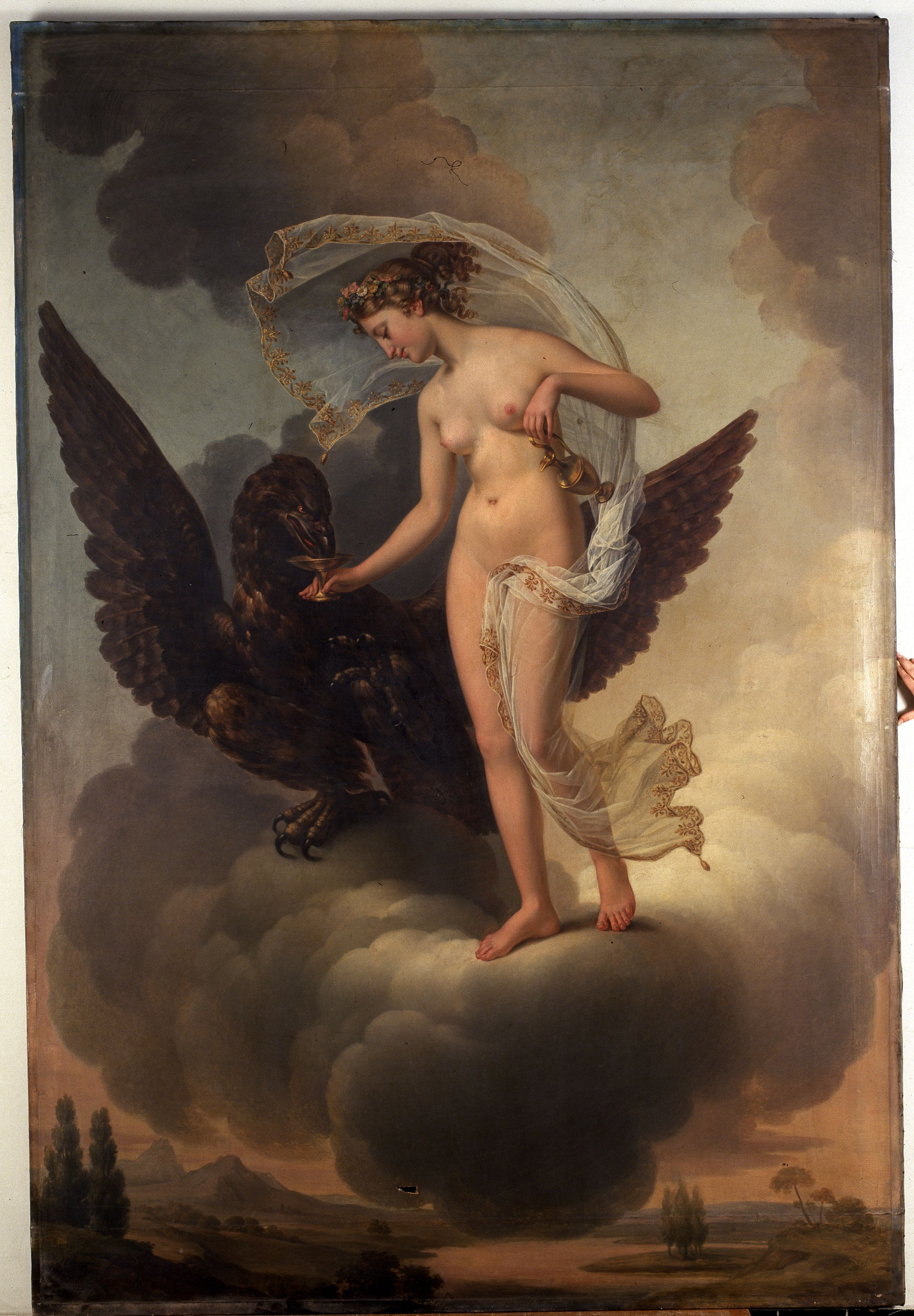
Hebe, c. 1826

Charles Picqué (20 June 1799 – 21 March 1869), also called Charles-Louis Picqué, was a Belgian painter, lithographer and engraver known for his neo-classical and romantic works. He was distinguished in several fields: portraiture, landscape, still-life, sacred art and history painting.

== Life ==
Charles Louis Picqué, born in Deinze in 1799, was the son of a master tailor, Philippe Picqué, and of Marie-Josine Cras. He studied at the Royal Academy of Fine Arts in Ghent as a student of Joseph Paelinck. In 1823, he won first prize from the Royal Academy of Fine Arts in Brussels and exhibited the same year at the Ghent Salon.

In 1824, he presented two works at the Brussels Salon and received first prize for Le vieux Tobie, aveugle, bénissant son fils ('Old, Blind Tobias Blessing his Son'). In August 1826, he received the grand prize for painting at the Ghent Salon for his Hébé et l'Aigle de Jupiter ('Hebe and the Eagle of Jupiter').

In 1827, he obtained a scholarship to go to Rome and train there for three years. In 1830, he also went to Naples before returning to Belgium. He also made numerous trips to Great Britain.

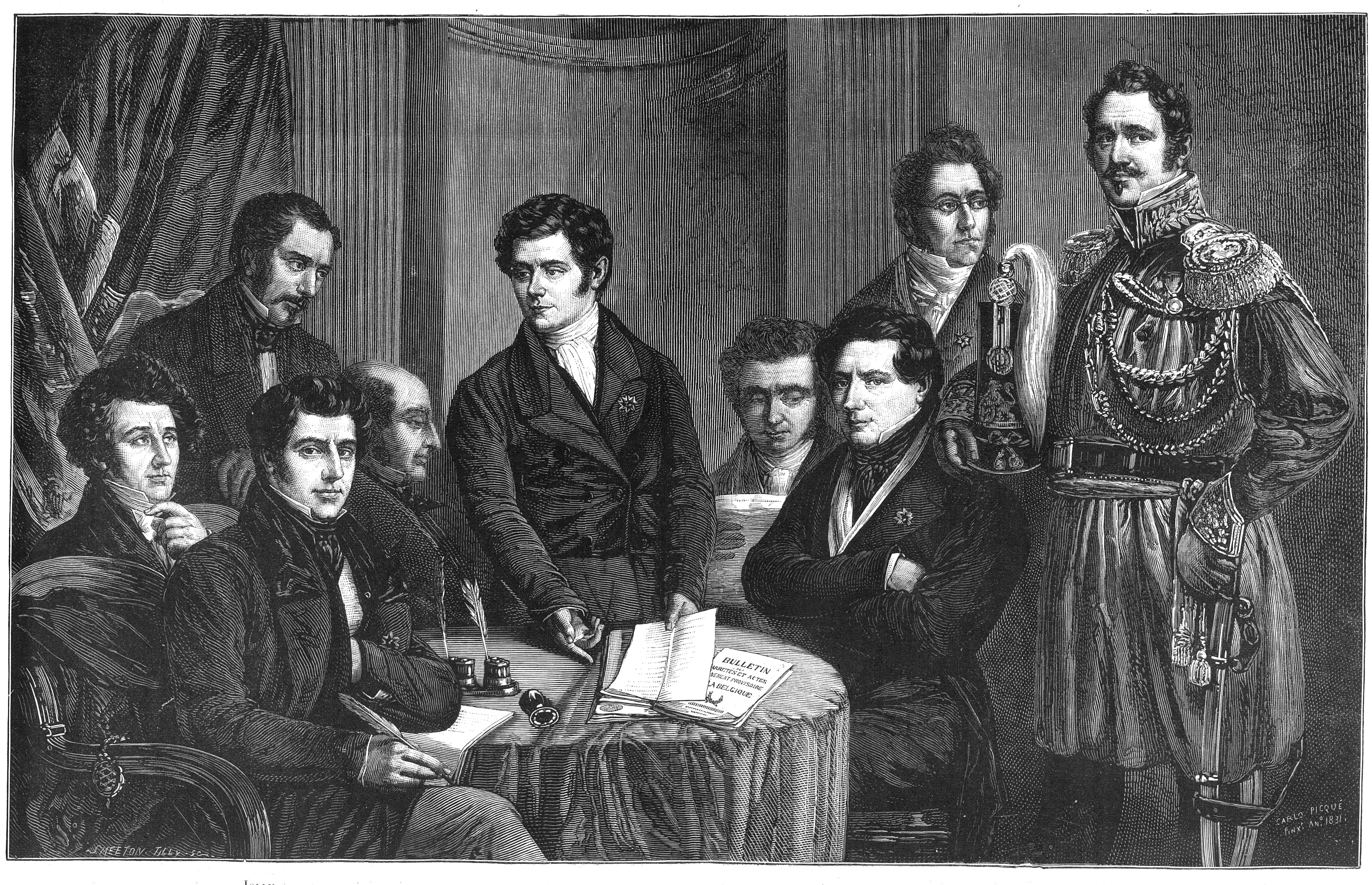
Provisional Government of Belgium, 1830 (engraving after Picqué)

He is also known for having created a painting representing a group portrait of the members of the Belgian provisional government of 1830.

Around 1845, he gave up history painting for portraiture and thereafter signed his works "Carlo Picqué". He died at the age of 69, on 21 March 1869, at his home on the rue de l'Étuve in Brussels. (Note: His death certificate, written in French on 23 March 1869, specifies that he died on 21 March, at 5 p.m., 78 rue de l'Étuve, and designates him as an artiste peintre ('painter'). The declarants are: 1) Camille Picqué, 34 years old, deputy head of section at the royal library in Brussels, son of the deceased and 2) Charles Verrassel, 62 years old, stationer in Brussels (act no. 2046 of the year 1869).)

=== Personal ===
On 27 June 1833, (Note: His marriage certificate, written in French, describes him as a peintre d'histoire ('history painter') and specifies that he was born in Deinze on 2 Messidor of the year VII, i.e. 20 June 1799 (act no. 334 of the year 1833).) Charles Picqué married Marie Jeanne Françoise Catherine Lubin (1807–1861) in Brussels. Two children were born from this union: Camille Joseph (1834–1909) and Virginie Hélène (1836–1917).

== Style ==
Charles Picqué remained faithful to neoclassicism when he stayed in Rome, but he later took liberties in the application of neoclassical precepts. The Flemish sense of colour in some of his work evokes Baroque painters such as Rubens and van Dyck. In addition to religious subjects, Picqué also painted folkloric scenes during his training in Rome.

== Works ==
- 1824: Portrait d'un prêtre ('Portrait of a Priest'), Brussels Salon of 1824;
- 1824: Le vieux Tobie, aveugle, bénissant son fils ('Old Tobias, Blind, Blessing his Son'), first prize at the Brussels Salon of 1824;
- 1826: Hébé et l'Aigle de Jupiter ('Hebe and the Eagle of Jupiter');

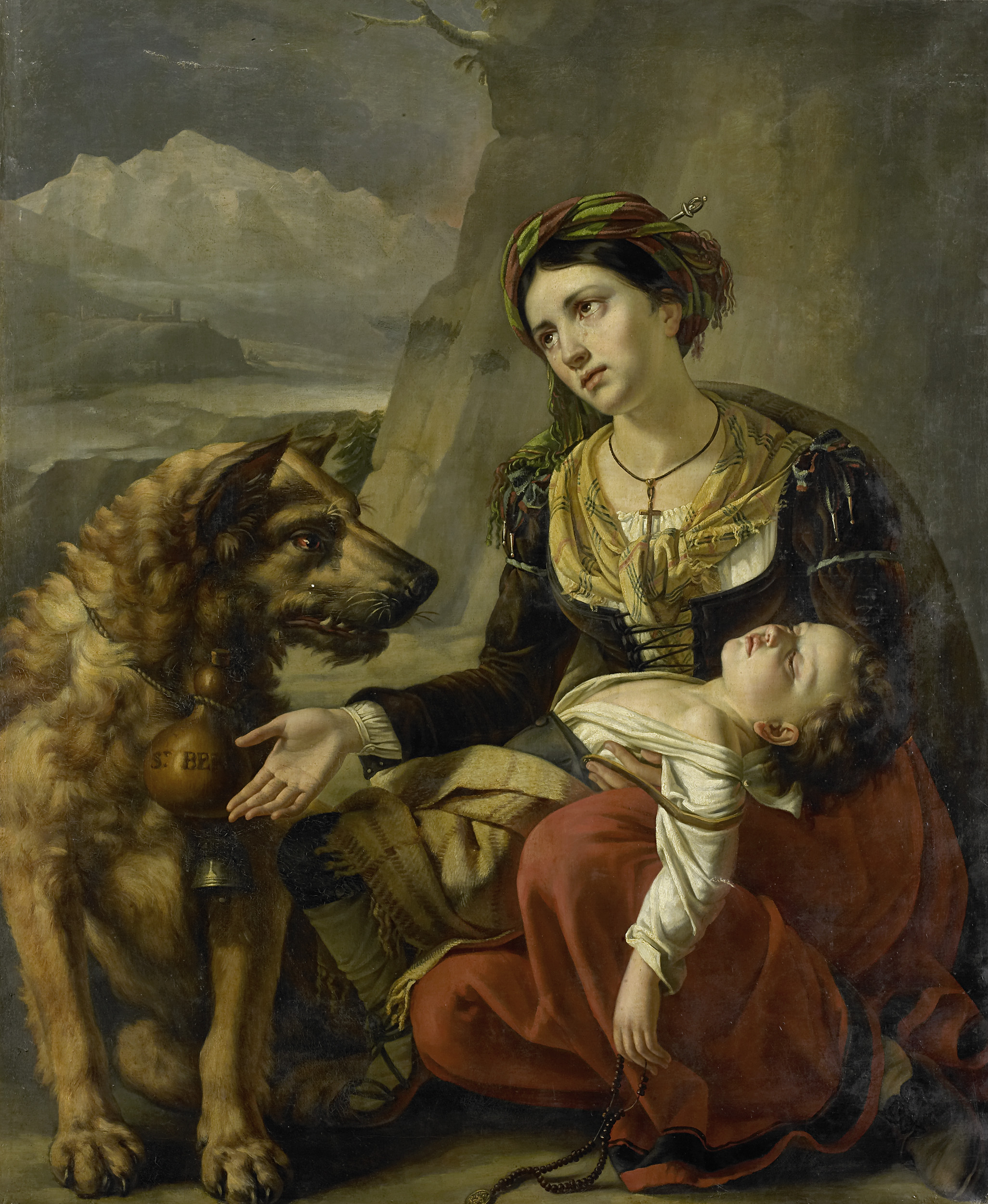
Saint Bernard Comes to the Aid of a Lost Woman with a Sick Child, 1827

- 1827: Un saint-Bernard vient en aide à une femme perdue avec un enfant malade ('A Saint Bernard Dog Comes to the Aid of a Lost Woman with a Sick Child'), conserved in the Rijksmuseum;

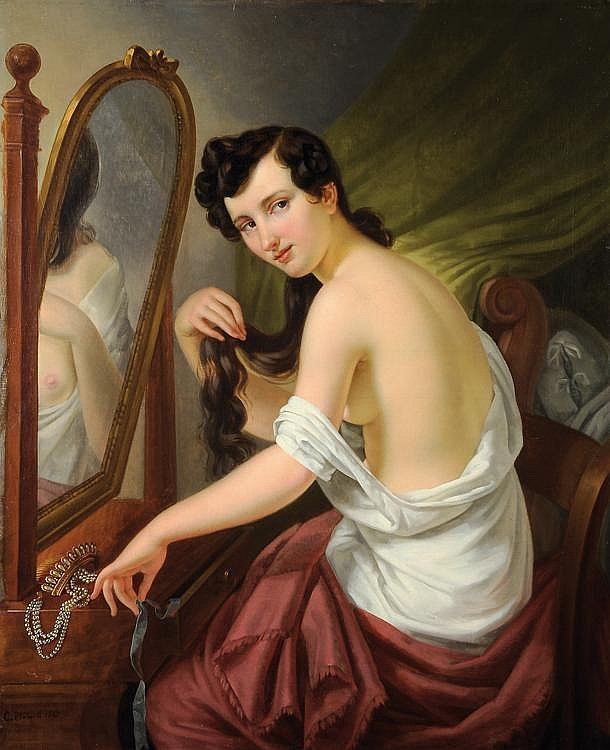
Woman at the Toilet, 1827

- 1827: Femme à la toilette ('Woman at the Toilet');
- 1830: Portrait d'une jeune Romaine ('Portrait of a Young Roman Woman'), now in the Museum of Deinze and the Lys Region;
- 1830: Portrait de Paolina ('Portrait of Paolina');
- 1830: Le gouvernement provisoire ('The Provisional Government '), oil on canvas, 162 x 250 cm, now in the Royal Museums of Fine Arts of Belgium;
- 1833: La fuite en Égypte ('The Flight into Egypt');
- 1833: Autoportrait ('Self-portrait'), now in the Royal Museums of Fine Arts of Belgium;
- 1835: La Sérénade ('The Serenade');
- 1835: Le Duo ('The Duo');
- 1835: Portrait de Jean-Louis van Aelbroeck ('Portrait of Jean-Louis van Aelbroeck');
- 1836: Portrait de Thérèse Beyaert et de sa fille ('Portrait of Thérèse Beyaert and her Daughter');
- 1836: Saint Roch guérissant les pestiférés ('Saint Roch Healing the Plague Victims');
- 1838: Portrait de Matthias Wolverley ('Portrait of Matthias Wolverley');
- 1842: Portrait de l'ingénieur Pierre Simons ('Portrait of the Engineer Pierre Simons'), oil on canvas, 82.5 x 69 cm, now in the Royal Museums of Fine Arts of Belgium;
- 1849: Le Songe ('The Dream');
- 1852: La Crèche ('The Crib');
- 1863: Portrait de Léonard Beckers ('Portrait of Leonard Beckers');
- 1868: Femme sortant du bain ('Woman Coming Out of the Bath').
- n.d.: Portrait des enfants de l'artiste ('Portrait of the Artist's Children'), oval miniature; oil on cardboard over bone, 3.7 x 4.5 cm, now in the Royal Museums of Fine Arts of Belgium.

== Links ==
- Media related to Charles Picqué (painter) at Wikimedia Commons
