= 1942 =

1942 in various calendars
- Gregorian calendar: 1942; MCMXLII
- Ab urbe condita: 2695
- Armenian calendar: 1391; ԹՎ ՌՅՂԱ
- Assyrian calendar: 6692
- Baháʼí calendar: 98–99
- Balinese saka calendar: 1863–1864
- Bengali calendar: 1348–1349
- Berber calendar: 2892
- British Regnal year: 6 Geo. 6 – 7 Geo. 6
- Buddhist calendar: 2486
- Burmese calendar: 1304
- Byzantine calendar: 7450–7451
- Chinese calendar: 辛巳年 (Metal Snake); 4639 or 4432 — to — 壬午年 (Water Horse); 4640 or 4433
- Coptic calendar: 1658–1659
- Discordian calendar: 3108
- Ethiopian calendar: 1934–1935
- Hebrew calendar: 5702–5703
- Hindu calendars
- Vikram Samvat: 1998–1999
- Shaka Samvat: 1863–1864
- Kali Yuga: 5042–5043
- Holocene calendar: 11942
- Igbo calendar: 942–943
- Iranian calendar: 1320–1321
- Islamic calendar: 1360–1361
- Japanese calendar: Shōwa 17 (昭和１７年)
- Javanese calendar: 1872–1873
- Juche calendar: 31
- Julian calendar: Gregorian minus 13 days
- Korean calendar: 4275
- Minguo calendar: ROC 31 民國31年
- Nanakshahi calendar: 474
- Thai solar calendar: 2485
- Tibetan calendar: ལྕགས་མོ་སྦྲུལ་ལོ་ (female Iron-Snake); 2068 or 1687 or 915 — to — ཆུ་ཕོ་རྟ་ལོ་ (male Water-Horse); 2069 or 1688 or 916

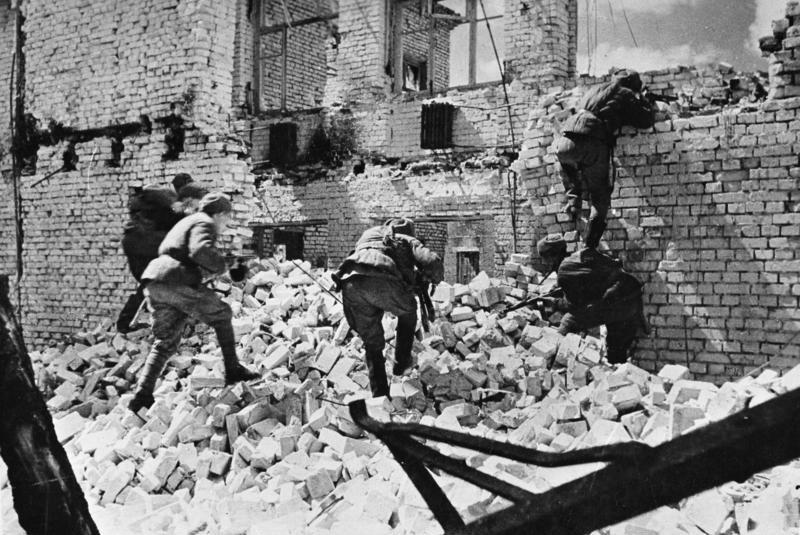
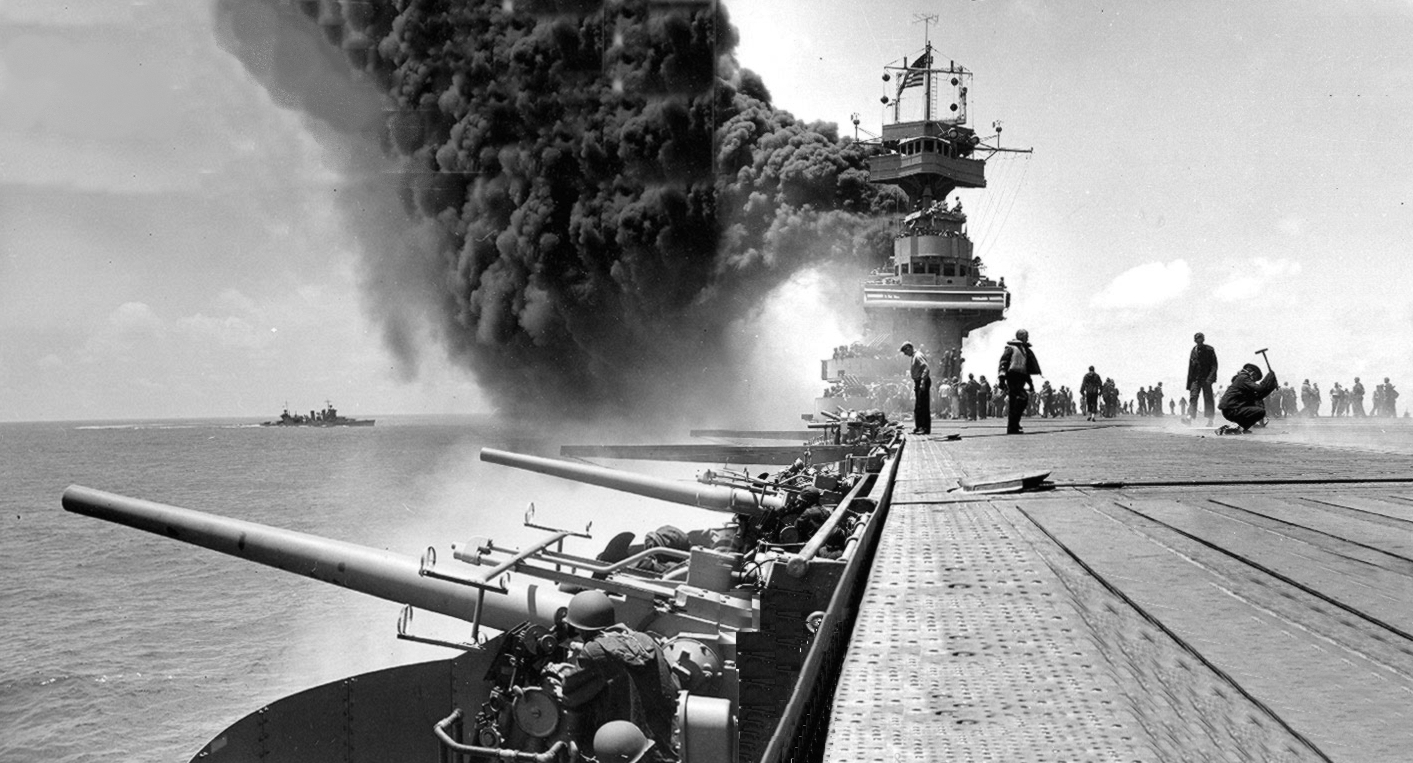
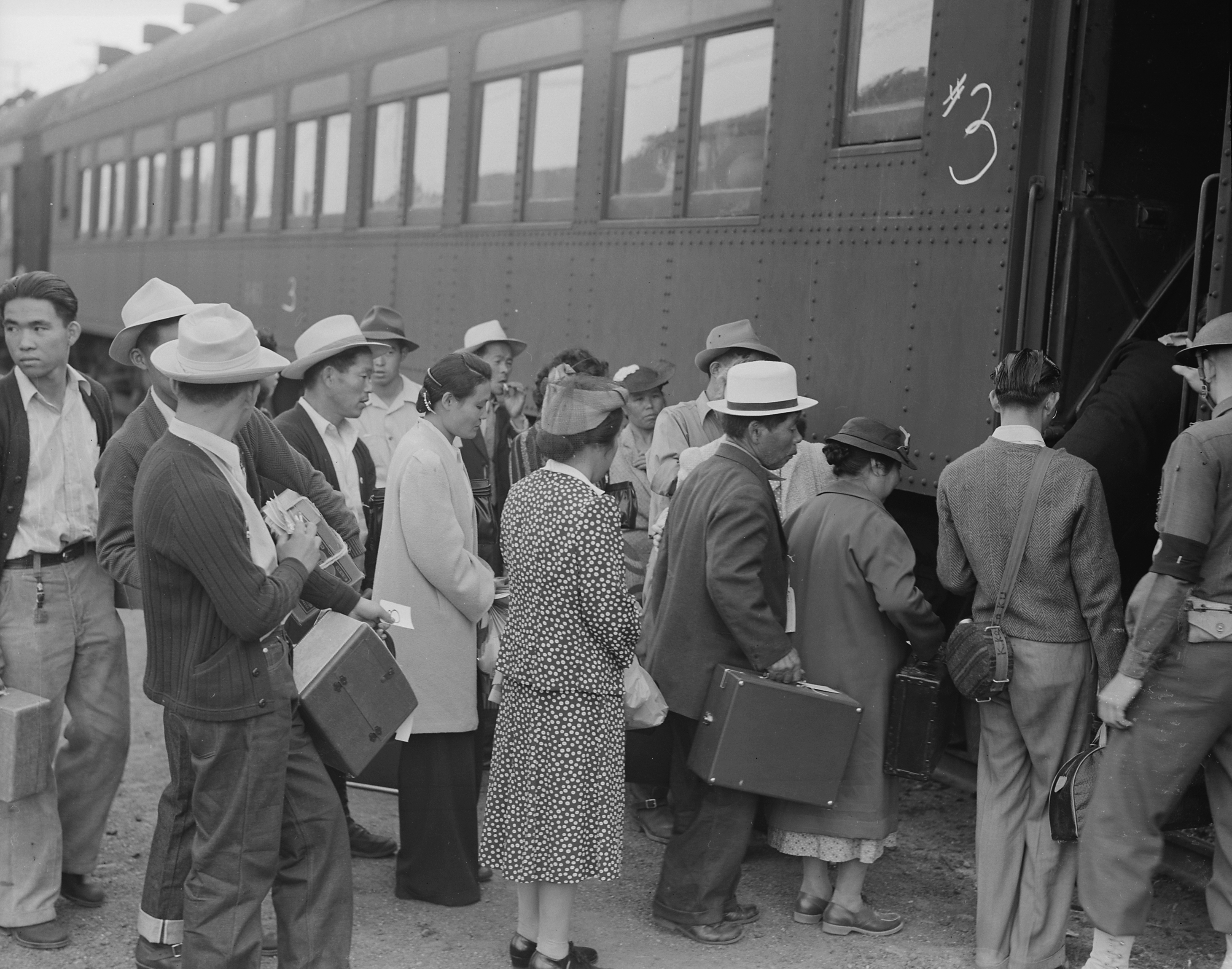
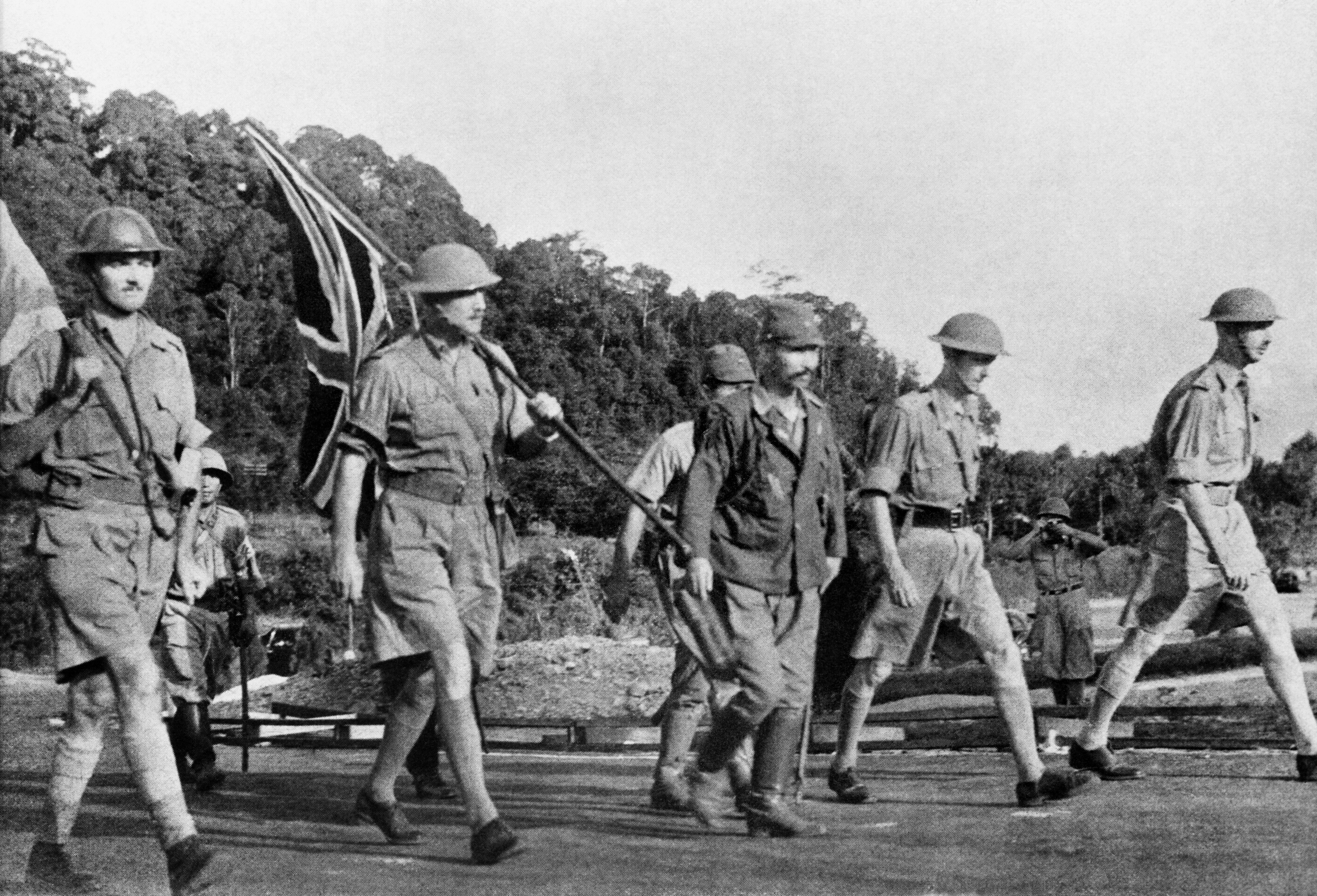
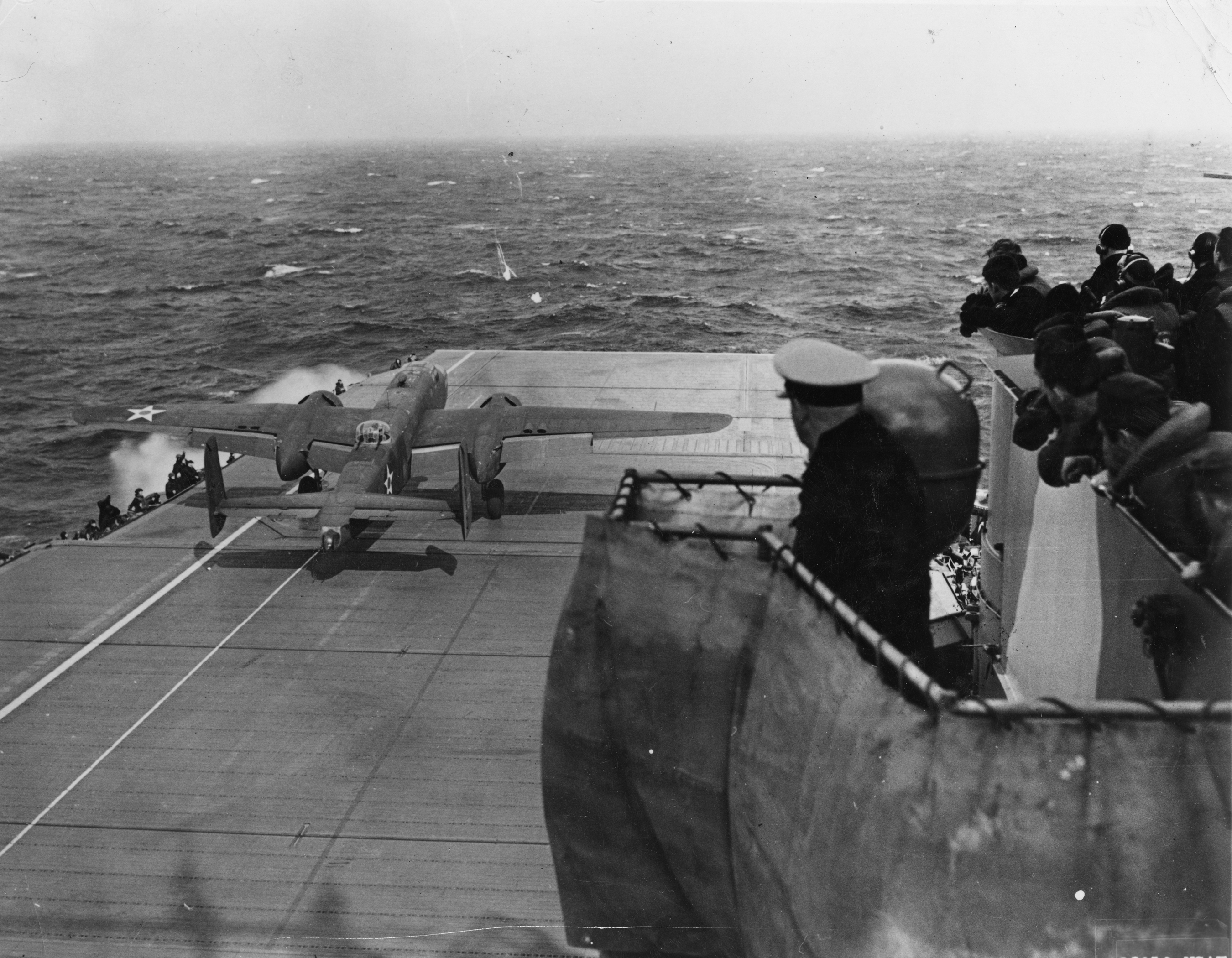
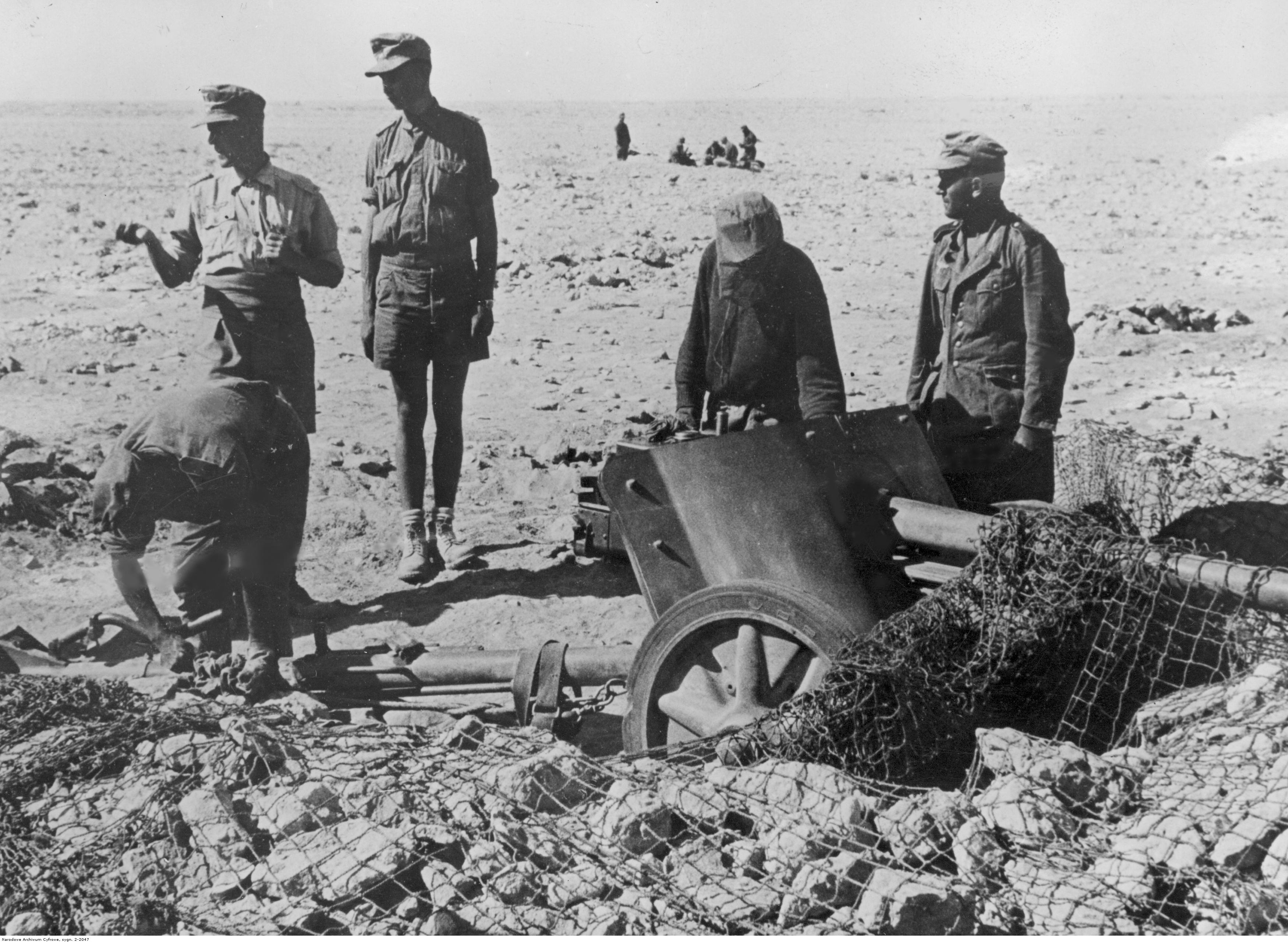
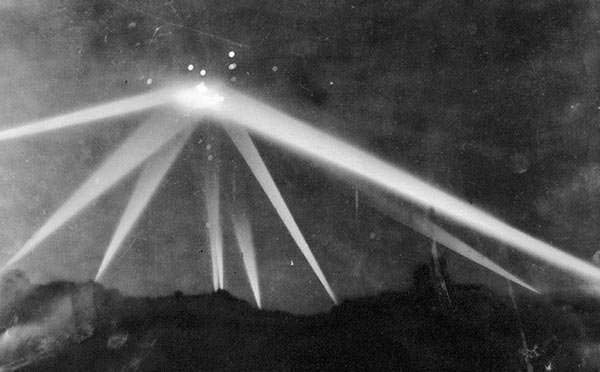
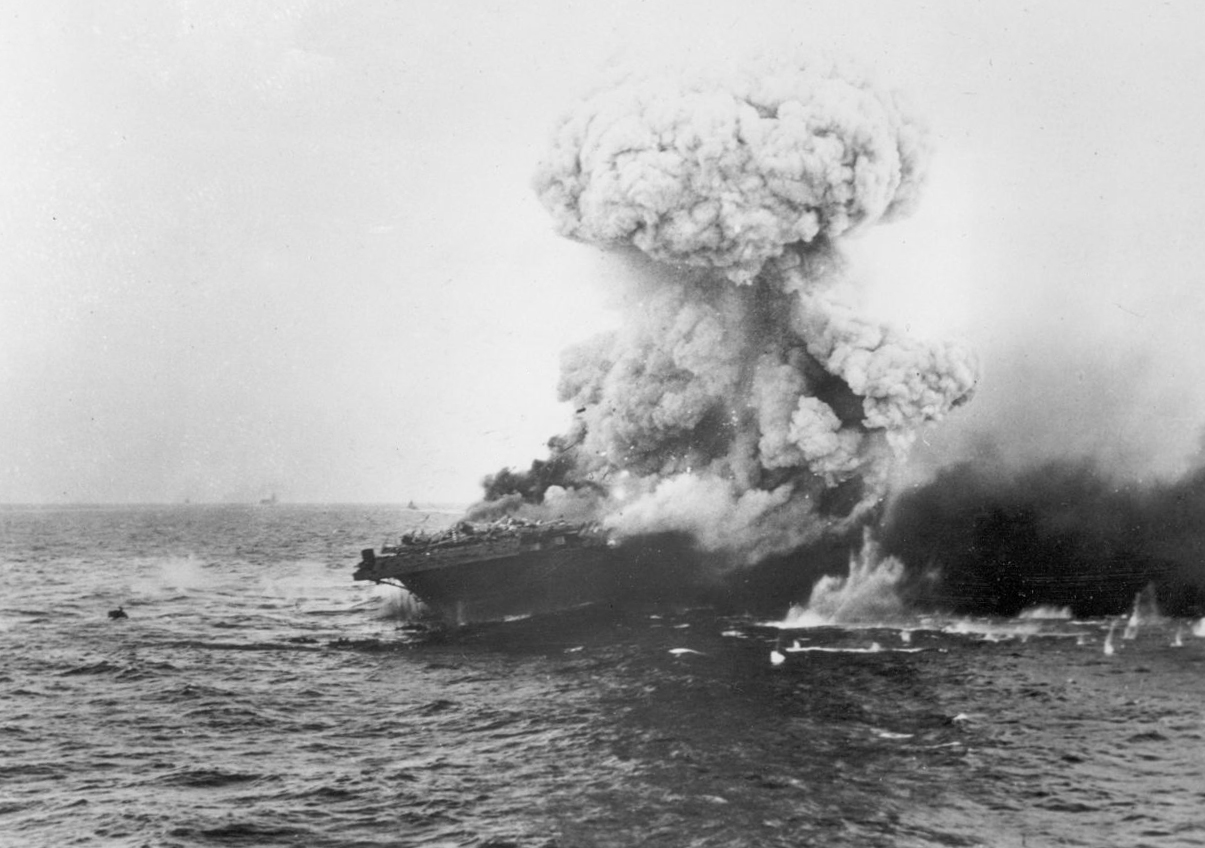
From top to bottom, left to right:
- The Battle of Stalingrad begins, a major turning point on the Eastern Front;
- The Battle of Midway sees the United States defeat the Empire of Japan in the Pacific;
- The Internment of Japanese Americans under Executive Order 9066 forces over 100,000 people into camps;
- The Fall of Singapore results in the capture of around 80,000 Allied troops;
- The Doolittle Raid becomes the first U.S. air attack on Japan, boosting morale;
- The Second Battle of El Alamein forces Axis retreat from Egypt;
- The Manhattan Project formally launches to develop atomic weapons;
- The Battle of Los Angeles causes anti-aircraft barrages over California after a false alarm;
- The Battle of the Coral Sea halts Japan’s advance toward Australia.

1942 (MCMXLII) was a common year starting on Thursday of the Gregorian calendar, the 1942nd year of the Common Era (CE) and Anno Domini (AD) designations, the 942nd year of the 2nd millennium, the 42nd year of the 20th century, and the 3rd year of the 1940s decade.

The Uppsala Conflict Data Program project estimates this to be the deadliest year in human history in terms of conflict deaths, placing the death toll at 4.62 million. However, the Correlates of War estimates that the prior year, 1941, was the deadliest such year. Death toll estimates for both 1941 and 1942 range from 2.28 to 7.71 million each.

== Events ==
Below, the events of World War II have the "WWII" prefix.

Map of Europe at the height of German control in 1942, Britain remains the only country in Western Europe held by Allied forces

=== January ===
- January 1 – WWII: The Declaration by United Nations is signed by China, the United Kingdom, the United States, the Soviet Union, and 22 other nations, in which they agree "not to make any separate peace with the Axis powers".
- January 5 – WWII: Two prisoners, British officer Airey Neave and Dutch officer Anthony Luteyn, escape from Colditz Castle in Germany. After travelling for three days, they reach the Swiss border.
- January 7 – WWII:
  - Battle of Slim River: Japanese forces of the 5th Division, supported by tanks, sweep through sixteen miles of British defenses, shattering the exhausted 11th Indian Division and inflicting some 3,000 casualties.
  - Operation Typhoon, the German attempt to take Moscow, ends in failure.
- January 11 – WWII:
  - Dutch East Indies campaign: Japan declares war on the Netherlands and the Dutch East Indies. Japanese forces invade Borneo and Celebes.
  - Malayan Campaign: The Japanese capture Kuala Lumpur, the capital of the Federated Malay States.
- January 12 – WWII:
  - New Zealand Squadron No. 488 loses two aircraft and five damaged against a force of 27 Japanese fighters, in their first combat mission in Singapore.
- January 13
  - Heinkel test pilot Helmut Schenk becomes the first person to escape from a stricken aircraft with an ejection seat.
  - Henry Ford patents a plastic automobile that would be 30% lighter than a conventional car.
- January 14
  - WWII: "Second Happy Time", the German submarine commanders' name for Operation PP (Operation Drumbeat), the phase in the Battle of the Atlantic during which German submarines are successful in attacking Allied shipping along the East Coast of the United States, opens early this morning when German submarine U-123 under the command of Reinhard Hardegen sinks a Norwegian tanker within sight of Long Island, before entering New York Harbor and sinking a British tanker off Sandy Hook the following night, as she leaves heading south along the coast. U-boat successes continue until around June 12.
  - The Sikorsky R-4 first flies in the United States; it will become the first mass-produced helicopter.
- January 16 – American film actress Carole Lombard and her mother are among all 22 killed aboard TWA Flight 3 when the Douglas DC-3 plane crashes into Potosi Mountain near Las Vegas while she is returning from a tour to promote the sale of war bonds.
- January 17 – WWII: South African forces of the British 8th Army conquer the Halfaya Pass ("Hellfire Pass") in Egypt. The Halfaya garrison of 4,200 men of the Italian 55th Division "Savona" and 2,100 Germans surrender.
- January 19 – WWII: Japanese forces invade Burma.
- January 20 – The Holocaust: Nazis at the Wannsee Conference convened by Reinhard Heydrich in Berlin decide that the "Final Solution (Endlösung) to the Jewish problem" is deportations to extermination camps.
- January 21 – WWII: Erwin Rommel launches his new offensive in Cyrenaica.
- January 23 – WWII: The Battle of Rabaul begins. Before dawn, 5,000 troops of Japan's elite South Seas Detachment storm ashore at Rabaul on the island of New Britain. With control of the air and support from the guns of their own ships, the Japanese overwhelm the small Australian garrison: the majority are either killed or captured. This marks the start of the New Guinea campaign.
- January 25 – WWII:
  - German forces under Erwin Rommel of Panzer Group Afrika reaches Msus. General Alfred Godwin-Austin orders the 4th Indian Division from the British 13th Corps to evacuate Benghazi.
  - Thailand declares war on the United States and the United Kingdom.
- January 26 – WWII: The first American forces arrive in Europe, landing in Northern Ireland.
- January 31 – WWII: Malayan Campaign: The last organized Allied forces leave British Malaya, ending the 54-day campaign, and the Johor–Singapore Causeway is severed.

=== February ===
- February 1
  - WWII: Marshalls–Gilberts raids: Admiral William Halsey Jr sends airstrikes from the carrier USS Enterprise against Kwajalein, Taroa, Wotje in the Marshall Islands. At the same time, cruisers and destroyers bombard Taroa and Wotje. The strikes inflict light to moderate damage on the three islands' naval garrisons, sink three warships and damage several others, including the light cruiser Katori and damage 15 Japanese aircraft. Further south, the carrier USS Yorktown attacks Jaluit, Mili and Makin in the Gilbert Islands. They inflict moderate damage to the Japanese naval installations and destroy three aircraft.
  - WWII: The Kriegsmarine introduces the M4 (German Navy 4-rotor) Enigma machine for U-boat traffic, blinding Allied cryptanalysts to their radio signals for most of the year.
  - WWII: The Command staff of the United States Eighth Air Force reaches England.
  - Mao Zedong makes a speech on "Reform in Learning, the Party and Literature", starting the Yan'an Rectification Movement in the Chinese Communist Party.
- February 3 – WWII: Rommel suspends his offensive in Cyrenaica.
- February 7 – United States Maritime Commission fleet operations are transferred to the War Shipping Administration (lasting until September 1, 1946).
- February 8
  - WWII: Battle of Singapore: Japanese forces of the 5th Division and 18th Division (some 23,000 men) begin to cross the Johor Strait and attack the Australian 22nd Brigade (some 3,000 men) at Singapore.
  - WWII: Daylight saving time goes into effect in the United States.
- February 9 – The ocean liner SS Normandie catches fire while being converted into the troopship USS Lafayette (AP-53) for WWII at Pier 88 in New York City; she capsizes early the following morning.
- February 11–13 – WWII: Operation Cerberus: A Kriegsmarine (German navy) squadron comprising the Scharnhorst and Gneisenau, heavy cruiser Prinz Eugen and their escort, dash from Brest through the English Channel to German ports; the British fail to sink any of them.
- February 14–18 – WWII: Battle of Bilin River: Indian forces of the 17th Division under General John Snyth are ordered to halt the Japanese advance but are outflanked and retreat to the Sittang River.
- February 15 – WWII: Fall of Singapore: Commonwealth forces under General Arthur Percival surrender to the Japanese 25th Army. About 80,000 British, Indian, Australian, and local troops become prisoners of war, joining the 50,000 soldiers taken in the Malayan campaign.
- February 16 – WWII: Bangka Island Massacre: Japanese soldiers machine-gun 22 Australian Army nurses and 60 Australian and British soldiers and crew who have survived the sinking of SS Vyner Brooke.
- February 18 – WWII:
  - Japanese occupation of Singapore: Sook Ching – Japanese forces begin the systematic extermination of perceived hostile elements among Chinese Singaporeans.
  - More than 200 American sailors die in Newfoundland when USS Truxtun runs aground near Chambers Cove and USS Pollux runs aground at Lawn Point.
- February 19 – WWII:
  - Bombing of Darwin: The Japanese 1st Air Fleet under Admiral Chūichi Nagumo bombs Darwin, Australia. This force comprises the aircraft carriers Akagi, Kaga, Hiryū and Sōryū and a powerful force of escorting surface ships. During the attack, 188 planes led by Mitsuo Fuchida destroy 11 vessels and wreck a lot of the harbor infrastructure, killing some 240 people.
  - A returning Japanese fighter plane crashes on Melville Island (Australia) and its pilot, Hajime Toyoshima, becomes the first Japanese captured on Australian soil, when indigenous resident Matthias Ulungura takes him prisoner .
  - President Franklin D. Roosevelt signs Executive Order 9066, allowing the United States military to define areas as exclusionary zones. These zones affect the Japanese on the West Coast, and Germans and Italians primarily on the East Coast.
- February 19–23 – WWII: Battle of Sittang Bridge: Indian forces of the 17th Division are ordered to defend the Sittang Bridge, but eventually blow up the bridge to halt the Japanese advance to Rangoon. Survivors of the 17th Division (some 3,500 soldiers) swim and ferry themselves over the Sittang River.
- February 22 – WWII: General George Marshall transmits a direct order to General MacArthur in President Roosevelt's name, ordering MacArthur himself to turn over command of the Philippines to a subordinate, and report to Australia to assume command of the large American force being built up there. The orders are worded to allow MacArthur to choose the exact moment of his departure; for various reasons, he will not leave until March 11.
- February 23 – WWII: I-17 fires 17 high-explosive shells toward an oil refinery near Santa Barbara, California, causing little damage.
- February 24
  - Struma disaster: MV Struma, carrying Jewish refugees from Axis-allied Romania to British-administered Palestine, is torpedoed and sunk by Soviet submarine Shch-213 in the Black Sea, killing about 791 men, women and children, with only 1 survivor.
  - Propaganda: The Voice of America begins broadcasting.
  - Internment of Japanese Canadians is ordered.
- February 25 – "Battle of Los Angeles": Over 1,400 AA shells are fired at an unidentified, slow-moving object (probably a meteorological balloon) in the skies over Los Angeles. The appearance of the object triggers an immediate wartime blackout over most of Southern California, with thousands of air raid wardens being deployed throughout the city. At least 5 deaths are related to the incident. Despite the several-hour barrages no planes are downed.
- February 26 – The 14th Academy Awards ceremony is held in Los Angeles; How Green Was My Valley wins Best Picture.
- February 27 – WWII:
  - Battle of the Java Sea: An allied (ABDA) task force of 14 vessels under Dutch command, trying to stem a Japanese invasion of the Dutch East Indies, is defeated by a 19-vessel Japanese task force in the Java Sea; 2.300 sailors die, including the commander, Admiral Karel Doorman; Japanese attain naval hegemony in East-Asia.
  - The USS Langley, first aircraft carrier of the United States Navy, is attacked by 9 Japanese bombers while ferrying a cargo of USAAF P-40 fighters to Java. Langley is so badly damaged that she has to be scuttled to avoid falling into Japanese hands.

=== March ===
- March 6 – WWII: Yugoslav Partisans, operating in Nazi-occupied Serbia, assassinate Đorđe Kosmajac in Belgrade.
- March 11 – WWII: Douglas MacArthur's escape from the Philippines – U.S. General Douglas MacArthur, his family and key members of his staff are evacuated by PT boat, under cover of evening darkness, from Corregidor in the Philippines. Command of U.S. forces in the Philippines passes to Major General Jonathan M. Wainwright.
- March 12 – WWII: American troops land at Nouméa on New Caledonia to build a base and garrison the island. This landing includes the first Seabees that are out on active service. The Seabees are Naval Construction battalions, and their name comes from the C and B in construction battalion.
- March 15 – The Holocaust: Dünamünde Action – 1,900 central European Jews are shot dead north east of Riga, 1,840 are killed on the 26th.
- March 16 – WWII: New Zealand and Australia declare war on Thailand.
- March 17 – The Holocaust: Operation Reinhard – The Nazi German Bełżec extermination camp opens in occupied Poland, about 1 km south of the railroad station at Bełżec in the Lublin district of the General Government. At least 434,508 people are killed here up to December 1942.
- March 18 – Franklin D. Roosevelt, President of the United States, signs Executive Order 9102, creating the War Relocation Authority (WRA), which becomes responsible for the internment of Americans of Japanese and, to a lesser extent, German and Italian descent, many of them legal citizens.
- March 19–30 – WWII: Battle of Toungoo – Chinese forces under General Dai Anlan set up a perimeter around Taungoo. The Japanese 55th Division bombards the positions on the west bank of the Sittaung River with artillery. The Japanese 56th Division links up with the 55th and crosses the river. Taungoo is surrounded and finally taken, while the remnants of the Chinese 200th Division withdraws to new defensive positions at Yedashe.
- March 20 – WWII: After being forced to flee the Philippines, U.S. General Douglas MacArthur announces (in Terowie, South Australia), "I came through and I shall return."
- March 22 – WWII: Second Battle of Sirte £ndash; Escorting warships of a British convoy to Malta ward off a much more powerful Regia Marina (Italian Navy) squadron, north of the Gulf of Sirte.
- March 23 – WWII: The Germans burn down the Ukrainian village of Yelino (Koriukivka Raion), killing 296 civilians.
- March 24 – The evacuation of Polish nationals from the Soviet Union begins. It is conducted in two phases: until April 5; and between August 10 and 30, 1942, by sea from Krasnovodsk to Pahlavi (Anzali), and (to a lesser extent) overland from Ashkabad to Mashhad. In all, 115,000 people are evacuated, 37,000 of them civilians, 18,000 children (7% of the number of Polish citizens originally exiled to the Soviet Union).
- March 25–26 – The Holocaust: First mass transport of Jews to Auschwitz concentration camp, 997 women and girls from Poprad transit camp in the Slovak Republic.
- March 28 – WWII:
  - St Nazaire Raid (Operation Chariot) – British Commandos raid Saint-Nazaire on the coast of Western France, to put its dockyard facilities out of action.
  - Bombing of Lübeck: The port city of Lübeck is the first German city attacked in substantial numbers by the British Royal Air Force, and the first following issue of the Area bombing directive ordering the RAF to attack whole cities. The night attack causes a firestorm that leads to destruction of the historic centre (including St. Mary's Church) and leads to the retaliatory "Baedeker Blitz" on historic British cities.
- March 29 – WWII: Following a coup d'état, the Free Republic of Nias is proclaimed by a group of freed Nazi German prisoners in the Indonesian island of Nias; the republic exists for less than a month until the island is fully occupied by Japanese troops.
- March 31 – WWII: Battle of Christmas Island – Japanese troops occupy Christmas Island without resistance, following a mutiny by British Indian Army troops against their British officers.

=== April ===
- April
  - The Holocaust: the Nazi German extermination camp Sobibór opens in occupied Poland, on the outskirts of the town of Sobibór. Between April 1942 and October 1943, at least 160,000 people are killed here.
  - 77 Uzbek prisoners of war held at Amersfoort concentration camp in the occupied Netherlands are shot by Nazi German guards, 24 of their compatriots having previously died there as a result of forced starvation.
- April 3 – WWII: Japanese forces begin the last phase of the Battle of Bataan, an all-out assault on the United States and Filipino troops on the Bataan Peninsula.
- April 5 – WWII: Easter Sunday Raid – Aircraft of the Imperial Japanese Navy attack Colombo, Ceylon (Sri Lanka). Royal Navy cruisers HMS Cornwall and HMS Dorsetshire are sunk southwest of the island.
- April 9 – WWII:
  - Battle of Bataan: The Bataan Peninsula falls, American and Filipino forces (some 75,000 soldiers) surrender to the Japanese 14th Army under General Masaharu Homma.
  - Bataan Death March: American and Filipino prisoners of war are forced to march from San Fernando to Capas (some 65 miles). During the march some 15,000 soldiers are killed by severe physical abuse and wanton killings.
  - The Japanese Navy launches an air raid on Trincomalee in Ceylon (Sri Lanka); the Royal Navy aircraft carrier HMS Hermes (95) and Royal Australian Navy destroyer HMAS Vampire are sunk off the country's east coast.
- April 10 – The Holocaust: Construction of the Nazi German extermination camp Treblinka II commences in occupied Poland near the village of Treblinka. Between July 23, 1942, and October 1943, around 850,000 people are killed here, more than 800,000 of whom are Jews.
- April 14 – WWII:
  - British submarine HMS Upholder is probably sunk by Axis forces in the Mediterranean.
  - German submarine U-85 is sunk by USS Roper off North Carolina.
- April 15 – WWII: Award of the George Cross to Malta: King George VI awards the George Cross to the island of Malta to mark the Siege of Malta, saying, "To honor her brave people I award the George Cross to the Island Fortress of Malta, to bear witness to a heroism and a devotion that will long be famous in history" (from January 1 to July 24, there is only one 24-hour period during which no bombs fall on this tiny island).
- April 17 – WWII: Henri Giraud, French general captured in 1940, escapes from Königstein Fortress near Dresden. He lowers himself down the cliffside fortress with a 50-meter 'rope' he made with odds and ends smuggled in to him. After traveling for three days, Giraud safely reaches the Swiss border.
- April 18 – WWII: Doolittle Raid – Lieutenant Colonel Jimmy Doolittle leads a bombing mission against Japan, along with 79 other airmen of the U.S. Air Force, flying 16 North American B-25 Mitchell land-based bombers. They take off from the USS Hornet in the Pacific Ocean, some 700 miles (1,126 km) east of Tokyo. Thirteen of the B-25 bombers fly over Tokyo and drop their bombs on oil storage facilities, factories and military targets. The other three B-25s drop their bombs over Yokohama, Nagoya and Kobe. All but one of the B-25s run out of fuel before reaching friendly forces in western China and are forced to land in Japanese-occupied China. With the support of Chinese farmers, 71 airmen reach free China. Eight airmen are captured by the Japanese, who execute four of them in retaliation for the raid.
- April 20 – WWII: Operation Calendar: The American aircraft carrier USS Wasp, escorted by the British battlecruiser HMS Renown, two cruisers and six destroyers, brings 47 planes (Spitfires) to Malta. They are successfully delivered – but 30 of them are immediately destroyed on the ground by German bombers and within 48 hours all are destroyed.
- April 23
  - WWII: Exeter becomes the first historic English city bombed as part of the Baedeker Blitz, in retaliation for the British bombing of Lübeck.
  - Exeter-born William Temple is enthroned as Archbishop of Canterbury.
- April 25 – Princess Elizabeth registers for war service in the U.K.
- April 26
  - WWII: The Reichstag meets for the last time, dissolving itself and proclaiming Adolf Hitler the "Supreme Judge of the German People", granting him the power of life and death over every German citizen.
  - A gas and coal dust explosion at Benxihu Colliery in Manchukuo kills as many as 1,549 workers, the world's all-time worst mining disaster.
- April 27
  - WWII: Conscription crisis in Canada: A national plebiscite is held on the issue of conscription.
  - The Jewish Star of David is required wearing for all Jews in the Netherlands and Belgium; Jews in other Nazi-controlled countries have already been wearing it.
- April 29 – WWII:
  - Burma campaign: Japanese forces of the 15 Army under General Shōjirō Iida capture Lashio. The allies are in full retreat.
  - An explosion at a chemical factory in Tessenderlo, Belgium leaves 200 dead and 1,000 injured.

=== May ===
- May – Operation Pluto: The plan to construct oil pipelines under the English Channel, between England and France, is tested in the River Medway.
- May 3–4 – WWII: Tulagi is invaded by Japanese forces in the British Solomon Islands of the South Pacific, as part of Operation Mo.
- May 5 – WWII: Battle of Madagascar (Operation Ironclad) begins when British forces land on the Vichy French colony of Madagascar. On May 7 the northern city of Diego Suarez surrenders.
- May 7 – WWII: On Corregidor, the last American and Filipino forces in the Philippines under command of 2LT Robert L. Obourn (92nd Coast Artillery Regiment, G Battery) from Fort Mills, surrender to the Japanese as directed by Lt. Gen. Jonathan M. Wainwright, the overall commander.
- May 8 – WWII:
  - The Battle of the Kerch Peninsula: The German 11th Army with Romanian forces launches Unternehmen Trappenjagd (Operation Bustard Hunt) and destroys the bridgehead of the three Soviet Armies (44th, 47th, and 51st) defending the Kerch Peninsula in the eastern part of the Crimean Front. The battle ends in an Axis victory.
  - The Battle of the Coral Sea between Japanese and American/Australian fleets, the first battle in naval history where the opponents fight without seeing each other's fleets. The Japanese achieve a tactical victory in terms of tonnage lost (including aircraft carrier USS Lexington) but are prevented from invading Port Moresby.
- May 8–9 – WWII: At night, gunners of the Ceylon Garrison Artillery on Horsburgh Island in the Cocos Islands revolt. The mutiny is crushed, and 3 soldiers are executed (the only British Commonwealth soldiers to be executed for mutiny).
- May 9 – WWII: Operation Bowery: Aircraft carriers USS Wasp and HMS Eagle bring 61 Spitfires to Malta ("Club Runs"). The fighter aircraft are desperately needed to bolster the island's defense against German Luftwaffe air raids.
- May 12 – WWII:
  - Second Battle of Kharkov: In the eastern Ukraine, the Soviet Army initiates a major offensive to capture the city of Kharkov from the German Army, only to be encircled and destroyed.
  - Japanese minelayer Okinoshima is sunk by American submarine USS S-42.
- May 15 – WWII: In the United States, a bill creating the Women's Auxiliary Army Corps (WAAC) is signed into law.
- May 20 – The first African-American seamen are taken into the United States Navy.
- May 21 – WWII: Sinking of the Mexican tanker Faja de Oro by German submarine U-160 off Key West.
- May 26 – WWII:
  - Battle of Gazala: German forces of Panzer Army Africa led by General Erwin Rommel launch a frontal attack on the central Gazala positions. During the day, the bulk of Rommel's forces move forward, giving the British the impression that this is the main Axis assault. When night falls, the armoured formations turn south in a sweeping move around the southern end of the Gazala line.
  - Battle of Bir Hakeim: The Free French and British troops slow the German advance in North Africa.
  - The Anglo-Soviet Treaty of 1942, to help establish a military and political alliance between the USSR and the British Empire, is signed in London by foreign Secretary Anthony Eden and Soviet foreign minister Vyacheslav Molotov.
- May 27 – WWII: Operation Anthropoid: Czech paratroopers acting for the Czech government in exile and trained in Britain attempt to assassinate Reinhard Heydrich, acting Reichsprotektor of the Nazi Protectorate of Bohemia and Moravia, in Prague, and succeed in wounding him.
- May 29 – Thai spelling reform of 1942 is initiated by the government of Prime Minister Field Marshal Plaek Phibunsongkhram with his office announcing a simplification of the Thai alphabet. The announcement is published in the Royal Gazette on June 1. The reform is canceled by the government of Khuang Aphaiwong on August 2, 1944.
- May 30–31 – WWII: Bombing of Cologne – British RAF Bomber Command's "Operation Millennium", its first "1,000 bomber raid", with associated fires make 13,000 families homeless and kills around 475 people, mostly civilians; 3,330 non-residential buildings are destroyed.
- May 31–June 1 – WWII: Attack on Sydney Harbour: Japanese midget submarines infiltrate Sydney Harbour in Australia, in an attempt to attack Allied warships.

=== June ===
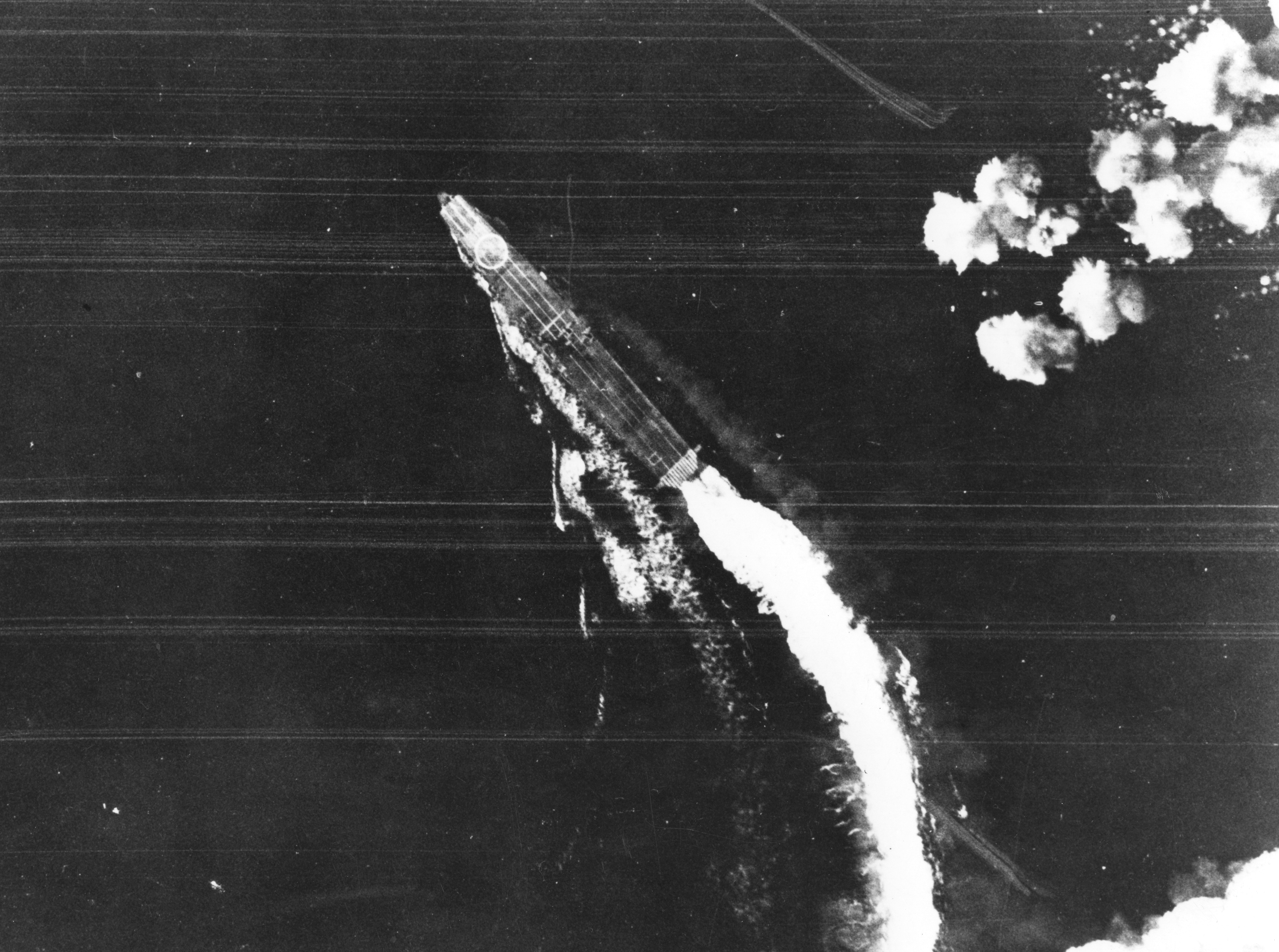
June 4: Japanese aircraft carrier Hiryū under attack by US aircraft at the Battle of Midway

- June 1
  - WWII: Mexico declares war on Germany, Italy and Japan after the sinking of a Mexican tanker by a German U-boat a week earlier.
  - The Grand Coulee Dam is finished on the Columbia River in the United States.
- June 3–4 – WWII: The Aleutian Islands campaign opens with the Battle of Dutch Harbor, Japanese Navy aircraft carrier raids on the Dutch Harbor Naval Operating Base and Fort Mears, U.S. Army at Dutch Harbor on Amaknak Island in the Aleutian Islands, in the United States Territory of Alaska.
- June 4 – WWII: Reinhard Heydrich succumbs to wounds sustained on May 27, from Czechoslovak paratroopers acting in Operation Anthropoid.
- June 4–7 – WWII: Battle of Midway – An American naval victory halts the Japanese advance in the Pacific.
- June 5 – WWII: The United States declares war on Bulgaria, Hungary and Romania.
- June 6 – WWII: Aleutian Islands campaign: Japanese occupation of Kiska.
- June 8 – WWII: Attack on Sydney Harbour – The Australian cities of Sydney and Newcastle are shelled by Japanese submarines. The eastern suburbs of both cities are damaged, and the east coast is blacked out.
- June 10 – WWII:
  - Lidice massacre: Units of the Nazi Ordnungspolizei and Sicherheitsdienst shoot all 173 male residents of the Czech village of Lidice in retaliation for the assassination of Reinhard Heydrich. Of 503 inhabitants, a total of around 340 are killed, including 82 children deported to Chełmno extermination camp, and the remainder are removed. All domestic animals are killed and graves despoiled, the village is burned, remains blown up and the site landscaped out of existence; Nazi propaganda (which is open about the event) states "The name of the village was immediately abolished."
- June 11 – WWII: German forces of the 15th Panzer Division together with the 90th Light Division reach El Adem. Panzer Army Africa captures the area around El Adem, and the 29th Indian Brigade, which has defended El Adem is almost wiped out by the Germans.
- June 12–15 – WWII: Operation Harpoon – An Allied convoy under Admiral Alban Curteis leaves from Gibraltar with 6 merchant ships escorted by the British battleship HMS Malaya, aircraft carriers HMS Argus and HMS Eagle, 4 cruisers and 17 destroyers to Malta. Two of the six merchant ships completes the journey, at the cost of several Allied warships.
- June 13 – WWII: During the Battle of Gazala, German forces of the 21st Panzer Division advance from the west and attack the British tanks of the 22nd Armoured Brigade. Erwin Rommel demonstrates superiority in tactics, compressing the British armoured forces between two Panzer Divisions of the Panzer Army Africa and the Italian Ariete and Trieste Divisions. By the end of the day, the British tank strength is reduced from 300 tanks to about 70. Rommel establishes armour superiority and surrounds the "Knightsbridge" positions. Due to the many losses, this defeat becomes known as "Black Saturday" to the Eighth Army.
- June 14 – WWII: The British Eighth Army under General Neil Ritchie is forced with two divisions to withdraw from the Gazala Line. The defenders of El-Adem and two neighbouring boxes hold out against the Germans. The South African 1st Division retreats along the coast road, practically intact. General Claude Auchinleck orders Ritchie to hold the line south-east from Acroma (west of Tobruk) through El-Adem to Bir El Gubi.
- June 21 – WWII: Japanese submarine I-25 surfaces off the US Pacific Coast and bombards Fort Stevens at the mouth of the Columbia River. The fort itself is not damaged, though a nearby baseball field is destroyed.
- June 23 – WWII:
  - Erwin Rommel arrives in Bardia and gives the 90th Light Division orders to attack eastwards. The British 8th Army withdraws to Mersa Matruh, where the Indian 10th Division, elements of the Indian 5th Division and the British 50th Division take up positions.
  - The experimental early-type nuclear reactor L-IV has an accident, becoming the first nuclear accident in history and consisting of a steam explosion and reactor fire in Leipzig.
- June 24 – WWII: Units of the Nazi Gestapo, SS and Czech collaborators shoot all 33 adult residents of the Czech village of Ležáky in retaliation for the presence of a Czech resistance operative in the aftermath of the assassination of Reinhard Heydrich. 11 children are deported to Chełmno extermination camp and gassed. The village is demolished and will never be rebuilt. Nazi propaganda openly announces the event on June 26.
- June 28 – WWII: Operation Blue: German forces of Army Group South under Generalfeldmarschall Fedor von Bock drive to Stalingrad and the Baku oil fields. Spearheads of the 4th Panzer Army under General Hermann Hoth drive towards Voronezh, advancing nearly 50 km on day one. They crossed two rivers and cut the link one between the Soviet 13th and 40th armies.

=== July ===
- July – The Holocaust: Inmates of Westerbork transit camp in the occupied Netherlands begin to be shipped to Nazi extermination camps. From now until 1944 around 107,000, mostly Jewish, from here will be killed.
- July 1–27 – WWII: First Battle of El Alamein: British forces prevent a second advance by Axis forces into Egypt. The 15th and 21st Panzer Divisions are halted and Erwin Rommel orders his forces to regroup. The panzer strength of the German Afrika Korps has been reduced to only 26 vehicles.
- July 3 – WWII: Guadalcanal, occupied only by native Solomon Islanders, falls to the Japanese Naval construction force deployed to construct an airfield on the island.
- July 4 – WWII in the European Theater of Operations:
  - Twenty-four ships are sunk by German bombers and submarines after Convoy PQ 17 to the Soviet Union is scattered in the Arctic Ocean to evade the German battleship Tirpitz.
  - The United States Eighth Air Force inauspiciously flies its first mission in Europe, using borrowed British planes, and bombs targets in the Netherlands, such as De Kooy Airfield, attached to the Den Helder Naval Base. Three of six aircraft return; For this mission, Captain Charles C. Kegelman is the first member of the Force to be awarded the U.S. Distinguished Flying Cross.
- July 9 – Şükrü Saracoğlu forms a new (13th) government in Turkey, following the sudden death of prime minister Refik Saydam while working in the office.
- July 13 – WWII: U-boats sink three merchant ships in the Gulf of St. Lawrence.
- July 14 – WWII:
  - Bastille Day Gaullist demonstrations in Vichy France; 2 women are shot dead by members of the fascist French Popular Party (PPF) in Marseille.
  - Germany introduces the Ostvolk Medal for Soviet personnel in the Wehrmacht.
- July 16
  - The Holocaust: By order of the Vichy France government headed by Pierre Laval, French police officers round-up 13,000–20,000 Jews and imprison them in the Winter Velodrome.
  - Georges Bégué and others escape from the Mauzac prison camp.
- July 18 – WWII: The Germans test fly the Messerschmitt Me 262 (using only its jet engines) for the first time.
- July 19 – WWII: Battle of the Atlantic: German Grand Admiral Karl Dönitz orders the last U-boats to withdraw from there the United States Atlantic coast positions, in response to an effective American convoy system.
- July 21 – WWII: The Japanese establish a beachhead on the north coast of New Guinea in the Buna-Gona area; a small Australian force begins a rearguard action on the Kokoda Track campaign.
- July 22 – WWII: The Holocaust: The systematic deportation of Jews from the Warsaw Ghetto begins.
- July 23 – The Holocaust: The gas chambers at Treblinka extermination camp begin operation, killing 6,500 Jews newly arrived from the Warsaw Ghetto.
- July 29 – The Presidium of the Supreme Soviet of the Soviet Union institutes the Order of Suvorov and Order of Kutuzov and reinstates the Order of Alexander Nevsky.
- July 30 – WWII:
  - WAVES (Women Accepted for Volunteer Emergency Service), the United States Naval Reserve (Women's Reserve), is signed into law.
  - The SS Robert E. Lee is sunk in the Gulf of Mexico by U-166, which is itself sunk by the escorting patrol craft.
- July 31 – The Oxford Committee for Famine Relief (Oxfam) is founded in England.

=== August ===
- August 3–15 – WWII: Operation Pedestal – A British convoy of 14 merchant ships with a massive escort of two battleships, 4 aircraft carriers, 7 cruisers, 32 destroyers and smaller ships commanded by Admiral Edward Neville Syfret, sets sail to Malta under relentless attacks by day and night from enemy submarines, aircraft and Axis surface forces. The 55,000 tons of food and fuel (particularly from oil tanker SS Ohio) delivered by this convoy saves Malta from surrender and allows Malta-based aircraft and submarines to resume their attacks against Rommel's supply lines, although over 500 British sea- and airmen are killed and many ships (including carrier HMS Eagle (1918)) are lost.
- August 4 – WWII: Operation Letica: An assassination attempt on Serbian fascist Minister of Finance Dušan Letica, by a group Yugoslav Resistance fighters, fails.
- August 5 – WWII: German forces of the 4th Panzer Army under General Hermann Hoth resume their advance and reach Abganerovo, 70 km southwest of Stalingrad. They are stopped by the Soviet 64th Army under General Vasily Chuikov, who defend the southern approach to Stalingrad.
- August 7 – WWII: Guadalcanal campaign – The U.S. Navy and the U.S. Marine Corps start the first American offensive of the war, with an amphibious landing on the island of Guadalcanal in the Solomon Islands.
- August 8
  - WWII: Battle of Savo Island: The Japanese Imperial Navy under Admiral Gunichi Mikawa wins a spectacular victory over the US Navy and the Australian Navy at Savo Island. Five cruisers and one destroyer are sunk, Mikawa's decision to withdraw under cover of the night rather than attempt to destroy the Allied invasion transports is primarily because of a possible Allied carrier strike against his fleet.
  - WWII: Allied North Atlantic convoy SC 94 loses 10 ships, as the first to be heavily attacked by U-boats resuming mid-Atlantic wolf pack attacks, through the climactic winter of 1942–43.
  - WWII: In Washington, D.C., six German saboteurs are executed for their role in the failed mission Operation Pastorius (2 others are cooperative and receive sentences of life imprisonment instead, being freed a few years after the end of the war).
- August 9
  - Indian leader Mohandas Gandhi is arrested in Bombay, by British forces.
  - Start, led by the goalkeeper Nikolai Trusevich, play football against the German Luftwaffe team Flakelf in Nazi-occupied Kyiv. Against all odds, they win 5–3. Eight of them are later arrested and tortured, and at least four are killed.
  - Leningrad première of Shostakovich's Symphony No. 7, with the city still under siege.
- August 11 – Hedy Lamarr's and her friend George Antheil's frequency-hopping system for radio-controlled torpedoes is granted a patent under U.S. patent 2,292,387. In 1962 (at the time of the Cuban missile crisis), an updated version of their design will at last appear on Navy ships.
- August 13 – A Quit India resolution is passed by the Bombay session of the All India Congress Committee (AICC), which leads to the start of a historical civil disobedience movement across India.
- August 15 – WWII: American tanker Ohio reaches Malta, as part of the convoy of Operation Pedestal.
- August 16
  - Polish-Jewish teacher Janusz Korczak follows a group of Jewish children into the Treblinka extermination camp.
  - U.S. Navy blimp L-8 (Flight 101) comes ashore near San Francisco, eventually coming down in Daly City (the crew is missing).
- August 17
  - WWII: Raid on Makin Island: US Marines of the 2nd Raider Battalion (211 men) under Lt. Col. Evans Carlson embark aboard the submarines Argonaut and Nautilus at Pearl Harbor. The aim is to destroy the Japanese installations and gather intelligence. Only the first of these objectives is achieved, but the raid does boost morale and provide a test for Raider tactics.
  - WWII: Heavy bombers of the U.S. Eighth Air Force, based in England, conduct their first raid against occupied France.
- August 19 – WWII: Dieppe Raid: An Allied amphibious attack on the German-occupied port of Dieppe in northern France is repulsed. Some 6,000 men of the Canadian 2nd Infantry Division under General John Roberts, supported by 3 and 4 Commando, 50 or so US Rangers and Free French Commandos, are put ashore. The raid is designed to provide battle experience for the troops and to gain information about German defense methods. The casualties are some 3,600 men, 1 destroyer, 30 tanks and 33 landing craft.
- August 20 – Plutonium is isolated for the first time, at the Metallurgical Laboratory of the University of Chicago.
- August 21 – WWII: Battle of the Tenaru: The Americans defeat Japanese land forces on Guadalcanal.
- August 22 – WWII: Brazil declares war on Germany and Italy.
- August 23 – WWII: Battle of Stalingrad: German forces of the 16th Panzer Division reach the suburbs of Stalingrad. The German 6th Army under General Friedrich Paulus stabilishes the frontier and takes up positions at the Volga River.
- August 24
  - WWII: Charge of the Savoia Cavalleria at Izbushensky: An Italian cavalry regiment attacks Soviet forces with drawn sabers at Izbushensky, Russia, one of the last major cavalry charges.
  - WWII: Allied North Atlantic convoy ON 122 is attacked by U-boats, which sink 4 ships.
  - WWII: The 2-day Battle of the Eastern Solomons begins: Bombers from carrier USS Saratoga sink Japanese aircraft carrier Ryūjō near Santa Isabel Island, helping to lead to an Allied victory.
- August 25
  - WWII: Battle of Milne Bay opens, when Japanese marines land at Milne Bay.
  - Dunbeath air crash: Prince George, Duke of Kent, brother to King George VI and King Edward VIII, is among 14 to die in a military aircraft accident at Morven, Scotland, at the age of 39.
- August 27–28 – Sarny Massacre: Nazi troops and the Ukrainian Auxiliary Police systematically execute more than 14,000 people, mostly Jews, in and around Sarny in German-occupied Poland.
- August 29 – WWII: Tokyo Express: The Japanese navy starts night-time delivery of reinforcements, supplies and equipment to the Japanese forces operating in and around New Guinea and the Solomon Islands.
- August 30 – WWII: Luxembourg is formally annexed to the German Reich.
- August 30–September 5 – WWII: Battle of Alam el Halfa – British forces in the Western Desert resist a German attack under Erwin Rommel. German tanks get slowed down in the minefields around Alam el Halfa Ridge and are forced to withdraw.
- August 31 – The 1942 Luxembourgish general strike is launched, to protest against forced conscription in Luxembourg.

=== September ===
- September 2 – WWII: The island of Les Casquets in the Channel Islands is raided by the forerunner of the British SAS, the SSRF, led by Major Gus March-Phillipps; this is one of the first raids by Anders Lassen VC. In the raid, the entire garrison of 7 is abducted and returned to England as prisoners, and the radio and lighthouse are wrecked.
- September 3
  - WWII: Erwin Rommel orders a general retreat and carries the German forces of Panzer Army Africa back to the line running from Tel el Eisa – Deir el Shein - west of Deir el Munassib down to the Qattara Depression. Allied forces of the 2nd New Zealand Division and the British 7th Armoured Division ("Desert Rats") begin an assault, but they are repelled in a fierce rearguard action by the German 90th Light Division. During the attack, Rommel loses some 2,900 men, 50 tanks, a similar number of guns, and 400 vehicles.
  - The Holocaust: A German attempt to liquidate the Jewish Łachwa Ghetto in occupied Poland leads to an uprising, probably the first ghetto uprising of the war.
- September 5
  - WWII: Battle of Milne Bay: Japanese forces suffer their first defeat on land.
  - The Holocaust: The Jews of Wolbrom in occupied Poland are rounded up by the Germans and their Ukrainian collaborators.
- September 9 – WWII: A Japanese floatplane drops incendiary devices at Mount Emily, near Brookings, Oregon, in the first of two "Lookout Air Raids", the first bombing of the continental United States.
- September 10
  - WWII: North Atlantic convoy ON 127 is attacked by U-boats, sinking 6 ships.
  - The Women's Auxiliary Ferrying Squadron (WAFS) begins operation in the United States.
- September 12 – WWII: The RMS Laconia, carrying civilians, Allied soldiers, and Italian prisoners of war, is torpedoed off the coast of West Africa and sinks, killing 1,649 people.
- September 15 – WWII: The Women's Flying Training Detachment (WFTD) is established in the United States.
- September 24 – WWII: Andrée Borrel and Lise de Baissac become the first female SOE agents to be parachuted into occupied France.
- September 26 – The Holocaust: Nazi official August Frank issues the August Frank memorandum, setting out how the belongings of "evacuated" (i.e. murdered) Jews are to be disposed of.
- September 27 – WWII: Both the commerce raiding German auxiliary cruiser Stier and American Liberty ship SS Stephen Hopkins sink, following a gun battle in the South Atlantic. Hilfskreuzer Stier is the only commerce raider to be sunk by a defensively equipped merchant ship.

=== October ===
- October 2
  - British cruiser HMS Curacoa collides with liner RMS Queen Mary (carrying troops from the United States) off the coast of Donegal and sinks; 338 drown.
  - WWII: Japanese troopship Lisbon Maru sinks, following a torpedo attack the previous day by submarine USS Grouper off the coast of China; 829 are killed, mostly British prisoners of war who (unknown to the attacker) were being held on board.
  - The first American-built turbojet aircraft, the Bell P-59 Airacomet fighter prototype, makes its first official flight.
- October 3 – The first A-4 rocket is successfully launched from Test Stand VII at Peenemünde, Germany. The rocket flies 147 kilometers and reaches an altitude of 84.5 kilometers, becoming the first man-made object to reach space.
- October 9
  - WWII: Third Battle of the Matanikau on Guadalcanal: American forces defeat the Japanese.
  - The Statute of Westminster Adoption Act, passed by the Parliament of Australia, formalizes Australian autonomy from the United Kingdom.
- October 11 – WWII: Battle of Cape Esperance: On the northwest coast of Guadalcanal, United States Navy ships intercept and defeat a Japanese fleet, on their way to reinforce troops on the island.
- October 13 – WWII: North Atlantic convoy SC 104 is attacked by U-boats, sinking seven ships.
- October 14
  - The Holocaust: The International Committee of the Red Cross, meeting in special session at the Hotel Métropole, Geneva, Switzerland, declines to issue an international appeal condemning the holding of civilians in Nazi concentration camps.
  - WWII: A U-boat sinks the ferry SS Caribou off Newfoundland, killing 137.
- October 16
  - A cyclone and consequential floods in the Bay of Bengal kill 40,000 people, with particularly heavy damage around Contai.
  - Animated short film The Mouse of Tomorrow, featuring the debut of Mighty Mouse (as "Super Mouse"), is released in the United States.
- October 18 – WWII: Hitler issues the Commando Order, which stipulates that all Allied commandos encountered by German forces should be executed immediately without trial, even in proper uniforms, in response to the Dieppe Raid and Operation Basalt conducted by the Allies. After the war, the Nuremberg trials finds this order a direct violation of the laws and customs of war.
- October 21 – A Royal New Zealand Air Force torpedo bomber sinks the German MS Palatia, with a loss of 946 lives.
- October 23 – Award-winning composer and songwriter Ralph Rainger ("Thanks for the Memory") is among 12 people killed in a mid-air collision between an American Airlines DC-3 and a U.S. Army bomber near Palm Springs, California.
- October 23–26 – WWII: Battle for Henderson Field: Japanese forces fail to recapture Henderson Field airfield in Guadalcanal from the Americans.
- October 23–November 4 – WWII: Second Battle of El Alamein: British troops go on the offensive against the Axis forces.
- October 26 – WWII: Battle of the Santa Cruz Islands: Two Japanese aircraft carriers are heavily damaged and one U.S. Navy carrier is sunk.
- October 28
  - Film actor Errol Flynn is accused of statutory rape by two teenage girls.
  - The Alaska Highway is completed.
- October 29 – The Holocaust: In the United Kingdom, leading clergymen and political figures hold a public meeting to register outrage over Nazi Germany's persecution of Jews.
- October 30 – WWII:
  - U-boats sink 11 ships, attacking diversionary convoy SL 125, but move out of the path of approaching troopships, carrying Allied Operation Torch invasion forces.
  - British sailors board U-559 as it sinks in the Mediterranean and retrieve its Enigma machine and codebooks.

=== November ===
- November 1 – WWII: North Atlantic convoy SC 107 is heavily attacked by U-boats, sinking 15 ships.
- November 2 – A USAAF squadron, including B-24 Liberators, intercepts many Luftwaffe patrols off the coast of Oran, Algeria.
- November 3 – WWII: Second Battle of El Alamein: German forces under Erwin Rommel are forced to retreat during the night.
- November 6 – WWII: Battle of Madagascar ends when Vichy French forces on Madagascar sign an armistice with the Allies.
- November 8 – WWII:
  - Operation Torch: Elements of the Allied expeditionary force (some 105,000 men) under Lieutenant General Dwight D. Eisenhower lands simultaneously along the coastline of Morocco and Algeria in French North Africa.
  - French Resistance Coup in Algiers: 400 French civil resisters neutralize the Vichyist XIXth Army Corps and the Vichyist generals (Juin, Darlan, etc.), thus allowing the immediate success of Operation Torch in Algiers, and ultimately the whole of French North Africa.
- November 10 – WWII: In violation of a 1940 armistice, Germany invades Vichy France, following French Admiral François Darlan's agreement to an armistice with the Allies in North Africa.
- November 11 – The Turkish parliament passes the Varlık Vergisi, a capital tax mostly levied on non-Muslim citizens with the unofficial aim to inflict financial ruin on them and end their prominence in the country's economy.
- November 12 – WWII: Guadalcanal campaign: A naval battle near Guadalcanal starts between Japanese and American forces.
- November 13 – WWII:
  - Guadalcanal campaign: Aviators from the USS Enterprise sink the Japanese battleship Hiei.
  - British forces capture Tobruk.
- November 15 – WWII:
  - The Naval Battle of Guadalcanal ends: Although the United States Navy suffers heavy losses, it retains control of Guadalcanal.
  - British forces capture Derna, Libya.
- November 18 – WWII: North Atlantic convoy ON 144 is attacked by U-boats, sinking 5 ships.
- November 19 – WWII: Battle of Stalingrad: Soviet Union forces under General Georgy Zhukov launch the Operation Uranus counter-attacks at Stalingrad, turning the tide of the battle in the USSR's favor.
- November 20 – WWII: British forces capture Benghazi.
- November 21 – The completion of the Alaska Highway (also known as the Alcan Highway) is celebrated (however, the "highway" is not usable by general vehicles until 1943).
- November 22 – WWII: Battle of Stalingrad: The situation for the German attackers of Stalingrad seems desperate during the Soviet counter-attack Operation Uranus, and General Friedrich Paulus sends Adolf Hitler a telegram, saying that the German Sixth Army is surrounded.
- November 23 – WWII
  - A U-boat sinks the SS Benlomond off the coast of Brazil. One crewman, Chinese second steward Poon Lim, is separated from the others and spends 130 days adrift, until he is rescued on April 3, 1943.
  - Legislation approves the United States Coast Guard Women's Reserve, to help fill jobs and free men to serve during the war effort. They are known as the SPARS ("Semper Paratus, Always Ready!")
- November 25–26 – WWII: Operation Harling: A British Special Operations Executive team, together with Greek Resistance fighters, blows up the Gorgopotamos viaduct, in the first major sabotage act in occupied continental Europe.
- November 26
  - The movie Casablanca premières at the Hollywood Theater in New York City.
  - A riot involving infantrymen, military police, and local law enforcement officers occurs in Phoenix, Arizona, United States, leading to three deaths.
- November 27 – WWII: At Toulon, the French navy scuttles its ships and submarines, to keep them out of Nazi hands.
- November 28
  - Cocoanut Grove fire: A fire in the Cocoanut Grove nightclub in Boston, Massachusetts, kills 491.
  - The large-scale German "pacification" of the Zamojszczyzna region of Poland begins.
- November 29 – The Blue Star Line cargo liner MV Dunedin Star runs aground on the Skeleton Coast of Namibia. Crew and passengers survive, following a 26-day overland trek to Windhoek.
- November 30 – WWII: Battle of Tassafaronga – In a nighttime naval battle as part of the Guadalcanal campaign, ships of the Imperial Japanese Navy defeat those of the United States Navy.

=== December ===
- December 1 – Gasoline rationing begins in the United States.
- December 2 – Manhattan Project: Below the bleachers of Stagg Field at the University of Chicago, a team led by Enrico Fermi initiates the first self-sustaining nuclear chain reaction (a coded message, "The Italian navigator has landed in the new world" is then sent to U.S. President Franklin D. Roosevelt).
- December 4
  - The Holocaust: In Warsaw, two women, Zofia Kossak and Wanda Filipowicz, risk their lives by setting up the Council for the Assistance of the Jews.
  - WWII: USAAF bombers make their first raid on Italy.
- December 6 – Stary Ciepielów and Rekówka massacre: 5 families in Occupied Poland are executed by the Ordnungspolizei as part of the German retribution against Poles who helped Jews.
- December 7 – WWII:
  - British commandos conduct Operation Frankton, a raid on shipping in Bordeaux Harbour.
  - The battleship USS New Jersey (BB-62) is launched at Philadelphia, Pennsylvania.
- December 8 – A fire at Seacliff Lunatic Asylum in New Zealand kills 39 patients.
- December 10 – The Holocaust: The Polish government-in-exile sends copies of The Mass Extermination of Jews in German Occupied Poland, including Raczyński's Note, the first official report on The Holocaust, to 26 governments who signed the Declaration by United Nations.
- December 11 – WWII: Operation Lilliput: The Allies start a convoy operation for transportation of troops, weapons and supplies in a regular transport service between Milne Bay and Oro Bay in New Guinea. The first vessel to arrive at Oro Bay is Karsik, escorted by HMAS Lithgow, with four Stuart light tanks.
- December 12 – WWII: German troops began Operation Winter Storm, an attempt to relieve encircled Axis forces during the Battle of Stalingrad.
- December 15 – WWII: Guadalcanal campaign – Battle of Mount Austen, the Galloping Horse, and the Sea Horse: the United States and allied forces begin to attack Japanese positions near the Matanikau River.
- December 17 – The Allies issue the Joint Declaration by Members of the United Nations (as the answer to Raczyński's Note), the first time they publicly acknowledge the Holocaust.
- December 20 – WWII: First Arakan Campaign: Allied forces begin a counter-offensive into Burma. During the offensive, Japanese defenders occupying well-prepared positions repeatedly repulse the British and Indian forces.
- December 22
  - An avalanche in Aliquippa, Pennsylvania, kills 26, including Vulcan Crucible Steel heir-apparent Samuel A. Stafford Sr., when two 100 ton boulders fall on a bus filled with wartime steelworkers on their way home.
  - An airplane carrying prominent Ustashe general Jure Francetić crashes. Francetić dies as a result of the injuries on December 27.
- December 24 – French Admiral Darlan, the former Vichy leader who has switched over to the Allies following the Torch landings, is assassinated in Algiers.
- December 27 – The Union of Pioneers of Yugoslavia, a communist youth movement, is founded.
- December 28 – North Atlantic Convoy ON 154 is heavily attacked by U-boats, sinking 13 ships.
- December 31 – The Times Square Ball in Times Square, New York City is not dropped for the first time. Instead, there is a moment of silence at midnight, followed by the sound of bells playing from sound trucks at the base of One Times Square.

=== Date unknown ===
- DDT is first used as a pesticide.
- circa June – The 1942 FIFA World Cup competition in Association football, which Nazi Germany sought to host, is not held, due to World War II.

== Births ==
=== January ===
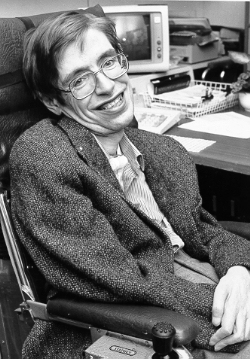
Stephen Hawking

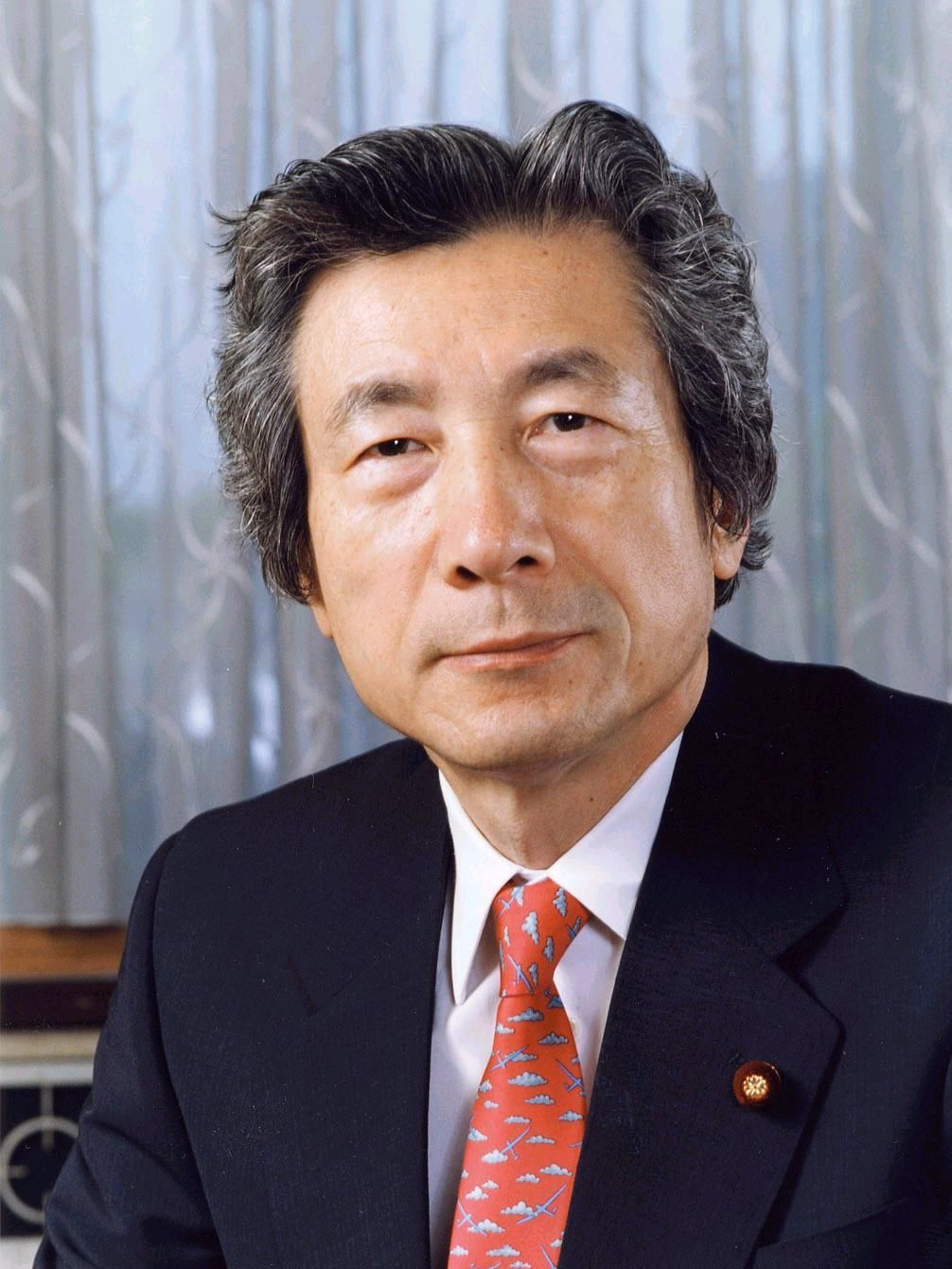
Junichiro Koizumi

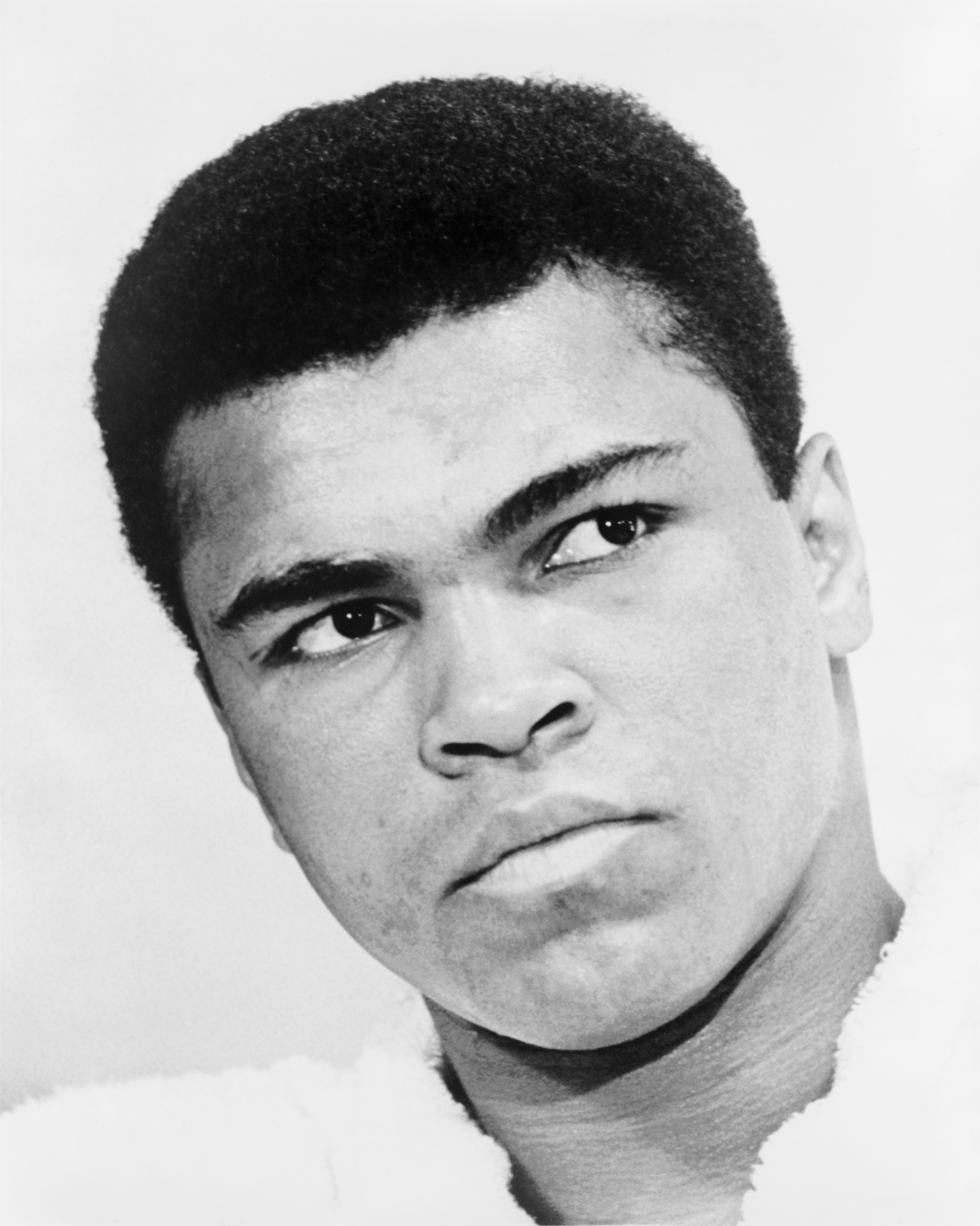
Muhammad Ali

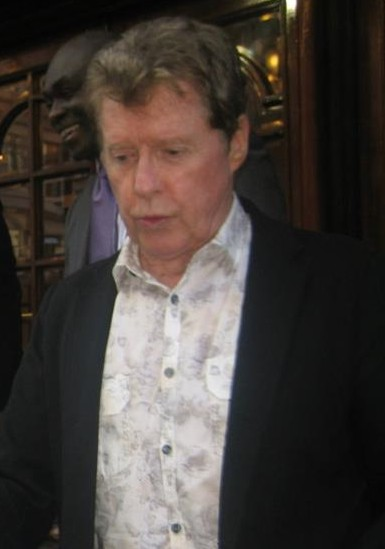
Michael Crawford

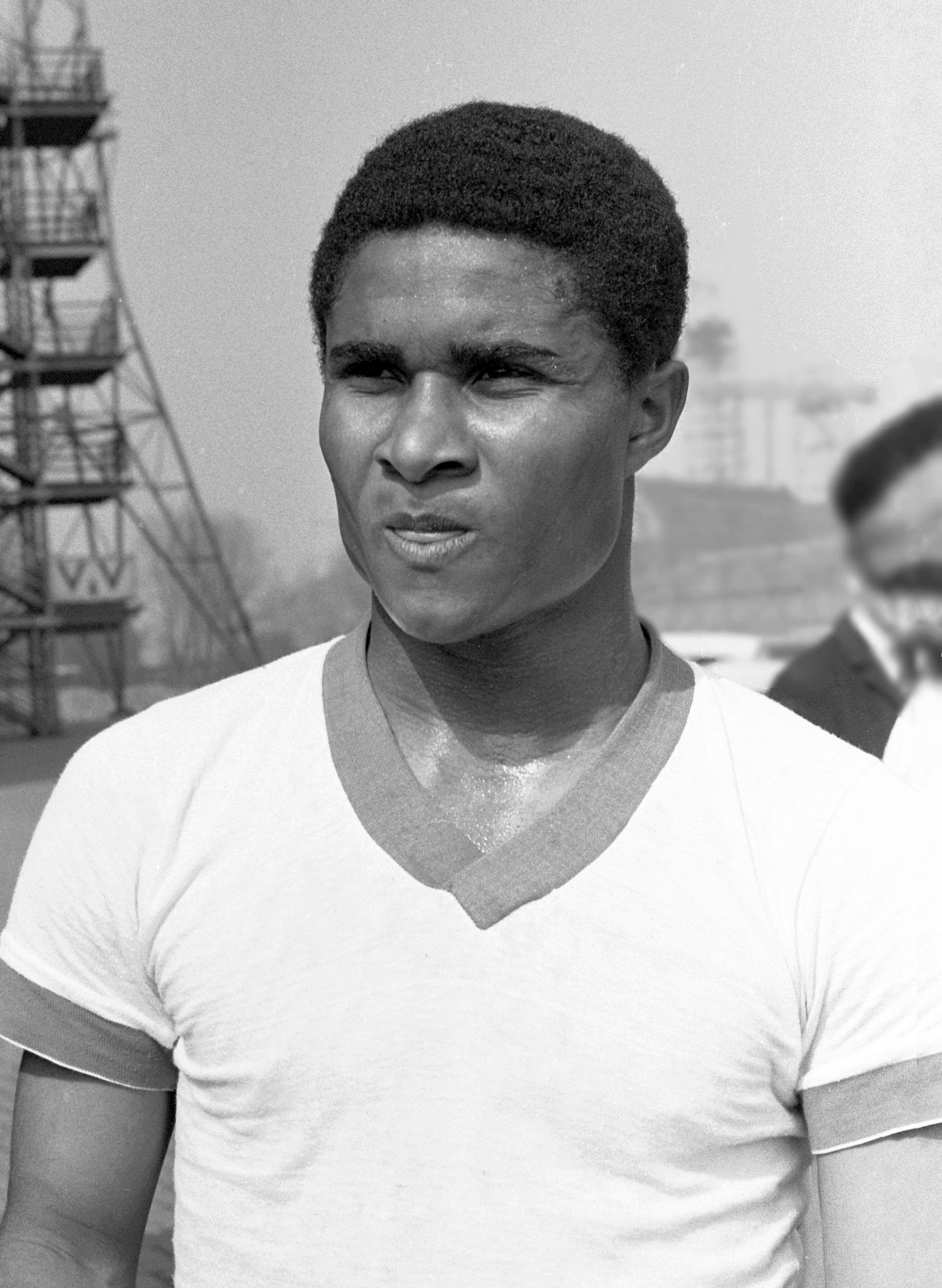
Eusébio

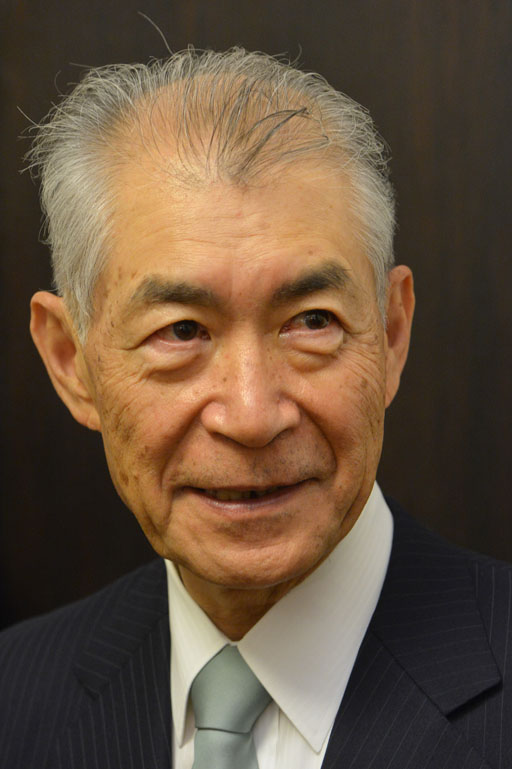
Tasuku Honjo

- January 1
  - Adil Abdul-Mahdi, 49th Prime Minister of Iraq
  - Country Joe McDonald, American singer/songwriter and musician (d. 2026)
  - Alassane Ouattara, 5th President of the Ivory Coast
  - Gennadi Sarafanov, Russian cosmonaut (d. 2005)
- January 3
  - László Sólyom, President of Hungary (d. 2023)
  - John Thaw, English actor (d. 2002)
- January 4
  - Jaber Al-Mubarak Al-Hamad Al-Sabah, 7th Prime Minister of Kuwait (d. 2024)
  - Dame Marcela Contreras, Chilean-British immunologist and educator
  - John McLaughlin, English guitarist, bandleader and composer
- January 5
  - Maurizio Pollini, Italian pianist (d. 2024)
  - Charlie Rose, American television anchor and talk show host
- January 7 – Vasily Alekseyev, Soviet weightlifter (d. 2011)
- January 8
  - Fauziyya Hassan, Maldivian actress (d. 2022)
  - Stephen Hawking, British physicist (d. 2018)
  - Junichiro Koizumi, 56th Prime Minister of Japan
- January 9 – Lee Kun-hee, South Korean businessman (d. 2020)
- January 10 – Walter Hill, American film director, screenwriter, and producer
- January 11
  - Clarence Clemons, African-American saxophonist (d. 2011)
  - Bill Sheridan, American basketball coach (d. 2020)
- January 12
  - Ramiro de León Carpio, 31st President of Guatemala (d. 2002)
  - Michel Mayor, Swiss astronomer, recipient of the Nobel Prize in Physics
- January 14 – Yogesh Kumar Sabharwal, Chief Justice of India (d. 2015)
- January 16
  - René Angélil, Canadian singer and manager (d. 2016)
  - Nicole Fontaine, French politician (d. 2018)
- January 17
  - Muhammad Ali, African-American boxer, activist, and philanthropist (d. 2016)
  - Forges, Spanish graphic humorist (d. 2018)
- January 19 – Michael Crawford, English actor, singer and entertainer
- January 21 – Edwin Starr, singer (d. 2003)
- January 22 – Amine Gemayel, 12th President of Lebanon
- January 23
  - Punsalmaagiin Ochirbat, 1st President of Mongolia (d. 2025)
  - Salim Ahmed Salim, 4th Prime Minister of Tanzania
- January 25 – Eusébio, Mozambican Portuguese footballer (d. 2014)
- January 26 – Árpád Urbán, Hungarian teacher and politician
- January 27 – Tasuku Honjo, Japanese immunologist, Nobel Prize laureate in Physiology or Medicine
- January 28
  - Hans Jürgen Bäumler, German figure skater, actor, pop singer and television host
  - Sjoukje Dijkstra, Dutch figure skater (d. 2024)
- January 29 – Arnaldo Tamayo Méndez, Cuban military officer, legislator, and cosmonaut
- January 30 – Marty Balin, American singer, songwriter, and musician (d. 2018)
- January 31
  - Daniela Bianchi, Italian actress
  - Derek Jarman, English director and writer (d. 1994)

=== February ===
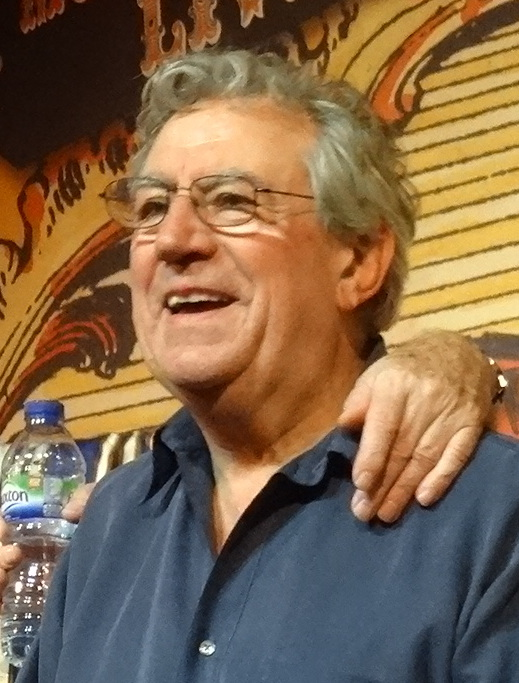
Terry Jones

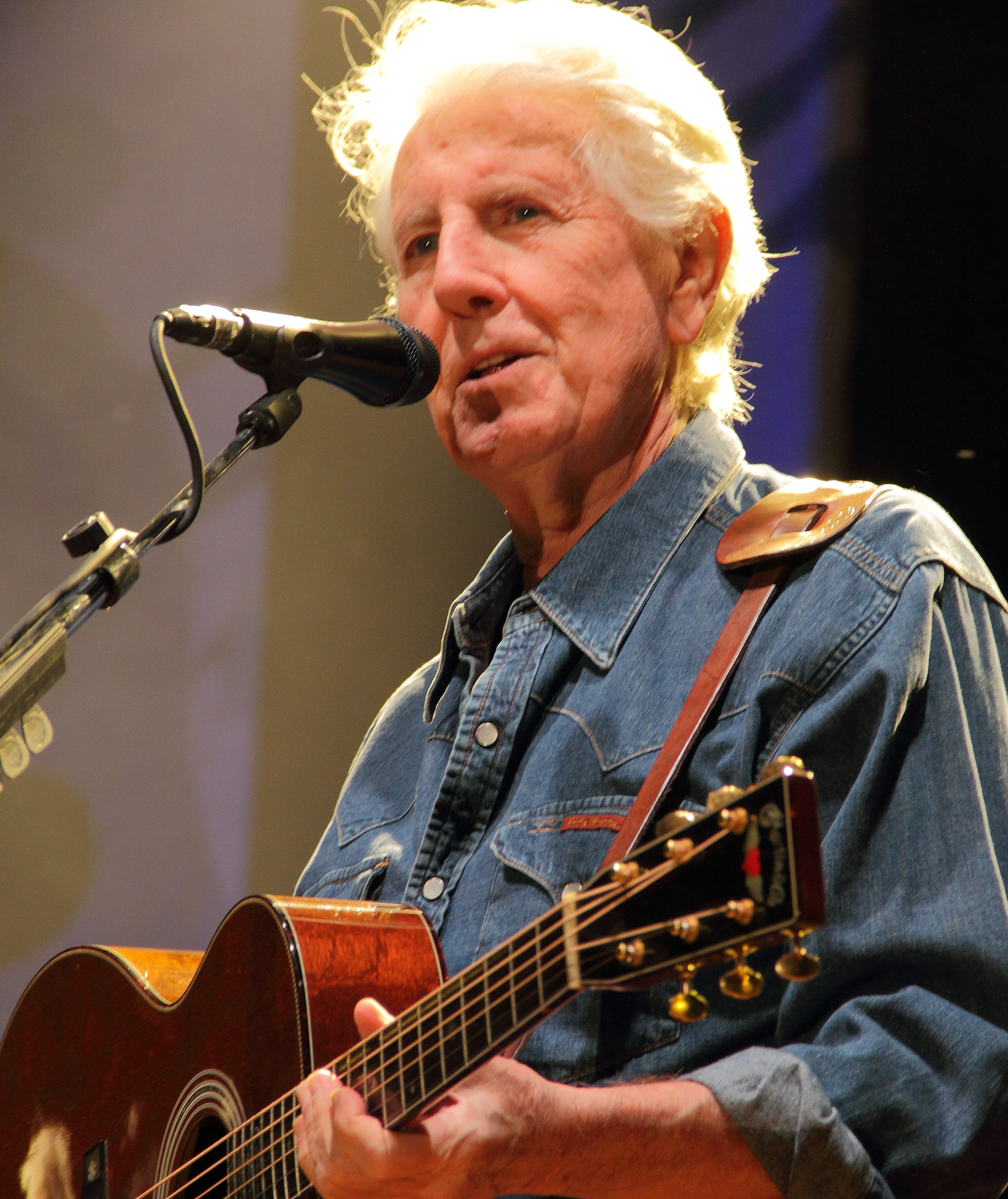
Graham Nash

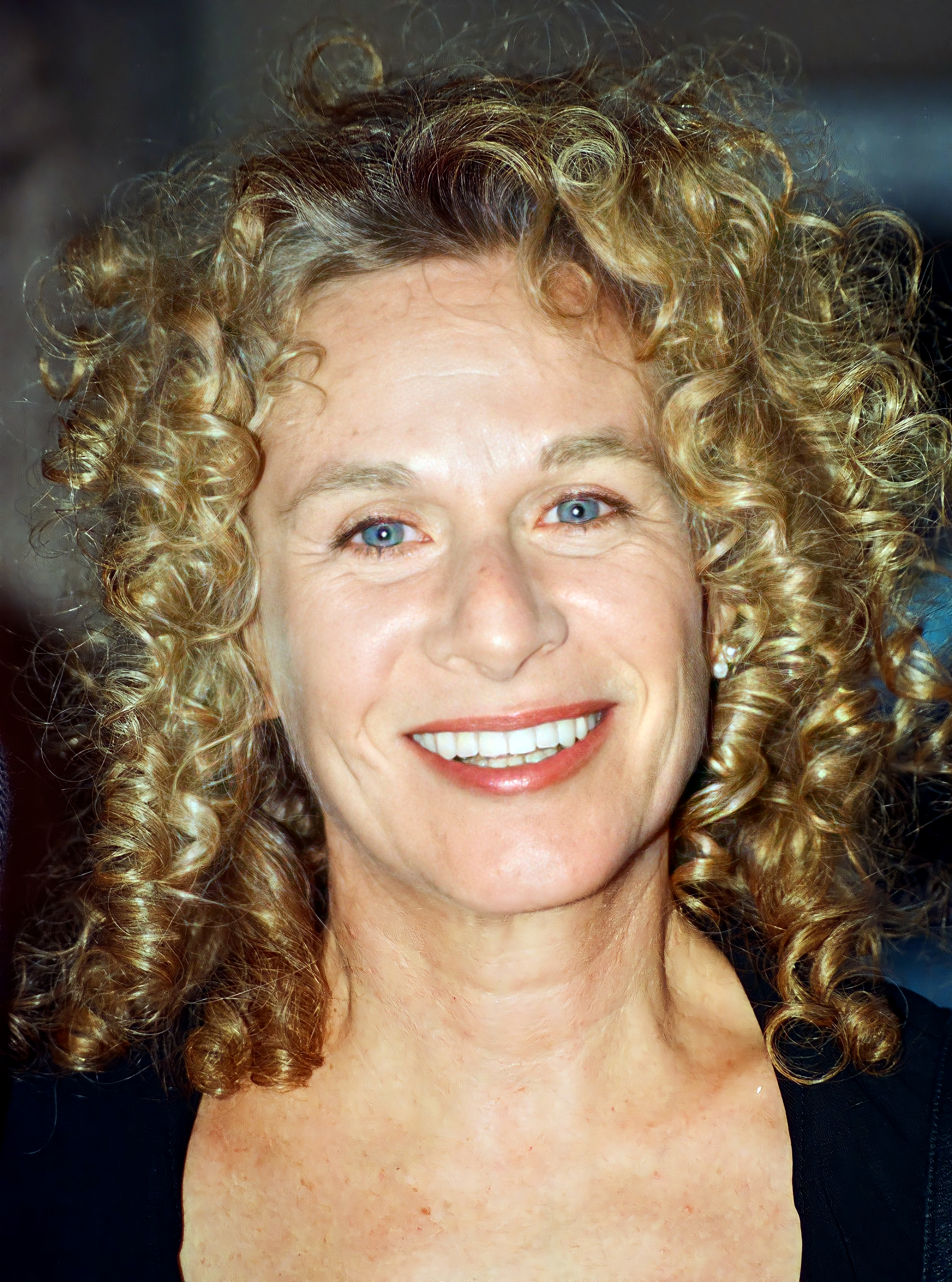
Carole King

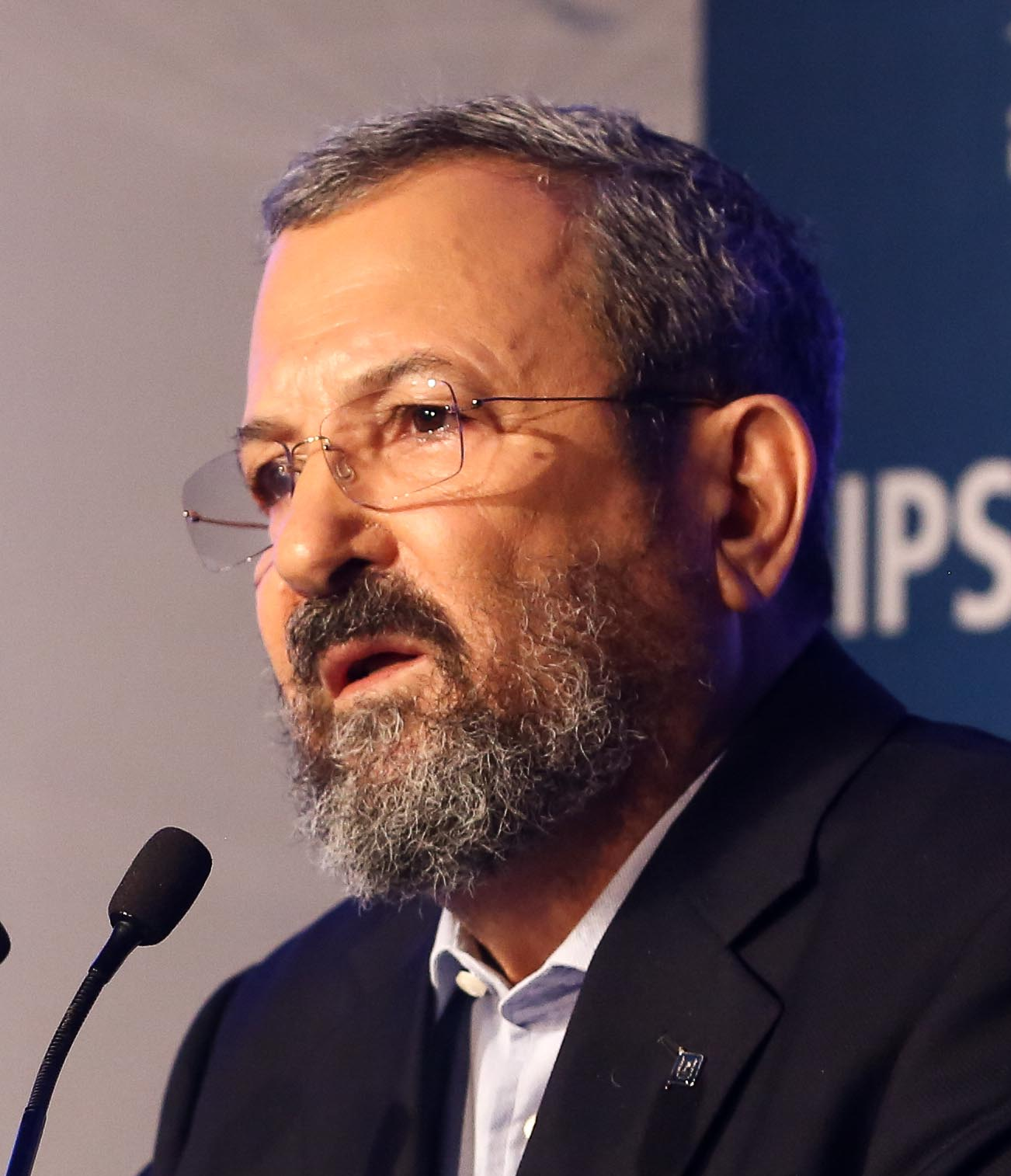
Ehud Barak

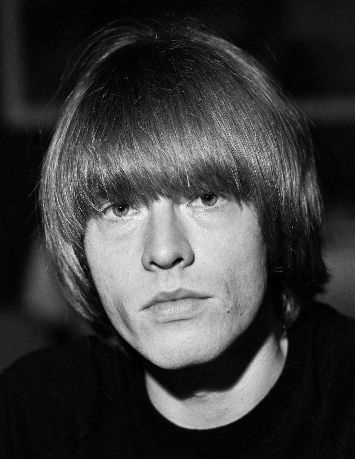
Brian Jones

- February 1
  - Bibi Besch, Austrian-American actress (d. 1996)
  - Terry Jones, Welsh actor (Monty Python) and writer (d. 2020)
  - Masa Saito, Japanese professional wrestler (d. 2018)
- February 2 – Graham Nash, English rock musician
- February 7 – Bernard Lietaer, Belgian engineer and economist (d. 2019)
- February 9
  - Manuel Castells, Spanish sociologist
  - Carole King, American singer and composer
- February 11 — Otis Clay, American R&B and soul singer (d. 2016)
- February 12 – Ehud Barak, 10th Prime Minister of Israel
- February 13
  - Carol Lynley, American actress (d. 2019)
  - Peter Tork, American musician and actor (d. 2019)
  - Donald E. Williams, American astronaut (d. 2016)
- February 15
  - Sadou Hayatou, 4th Prime Minister of Cameroon (d. 2019)
  - Sherry Jackson, American actress
- February 20
  - Phil Esposito, Canadian hockey player
  - Mitch McConnell, American politician, U.S. senior senator from Kentucky
- February 21 – Margarethe von Trotta, German actress, film director and writer
- February 22 – Christine Keeler, English model (d. 2017)
- February 25 – Karen Grassle, American actress
- February 26 – Jozef Adamec, Slovak football player and manager (d. 2018)
- February 27 – Robert H. Grubbs, American chemist, Nobel Prize laureate (d. 2021)
- February 28
  - Brian Jones, English musician (d. 1969)
  - Dino Zoff, Italian footballer and manager

=== March ===
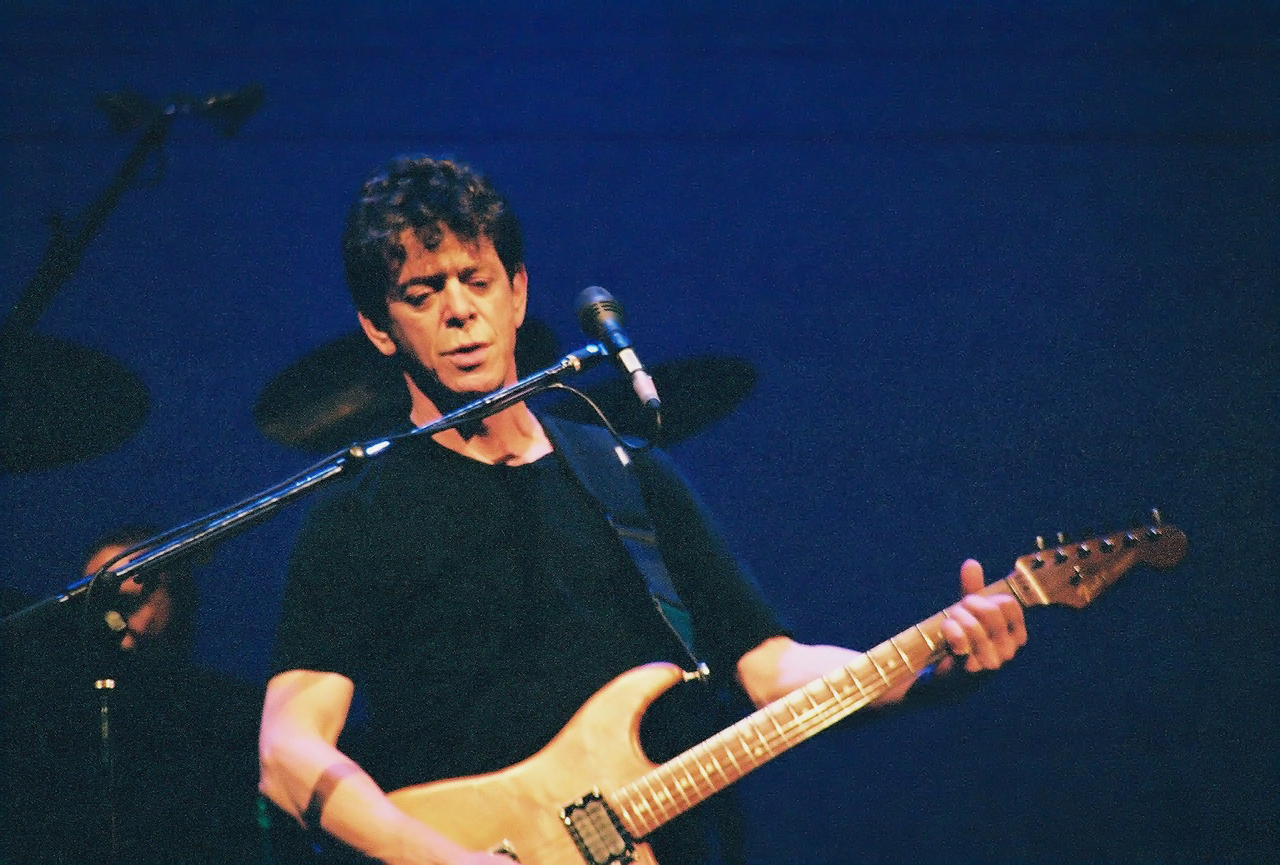
Lou Reed

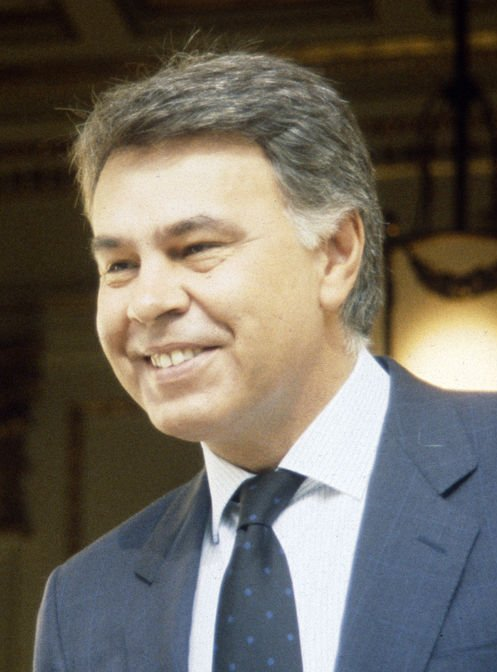
Felipe González

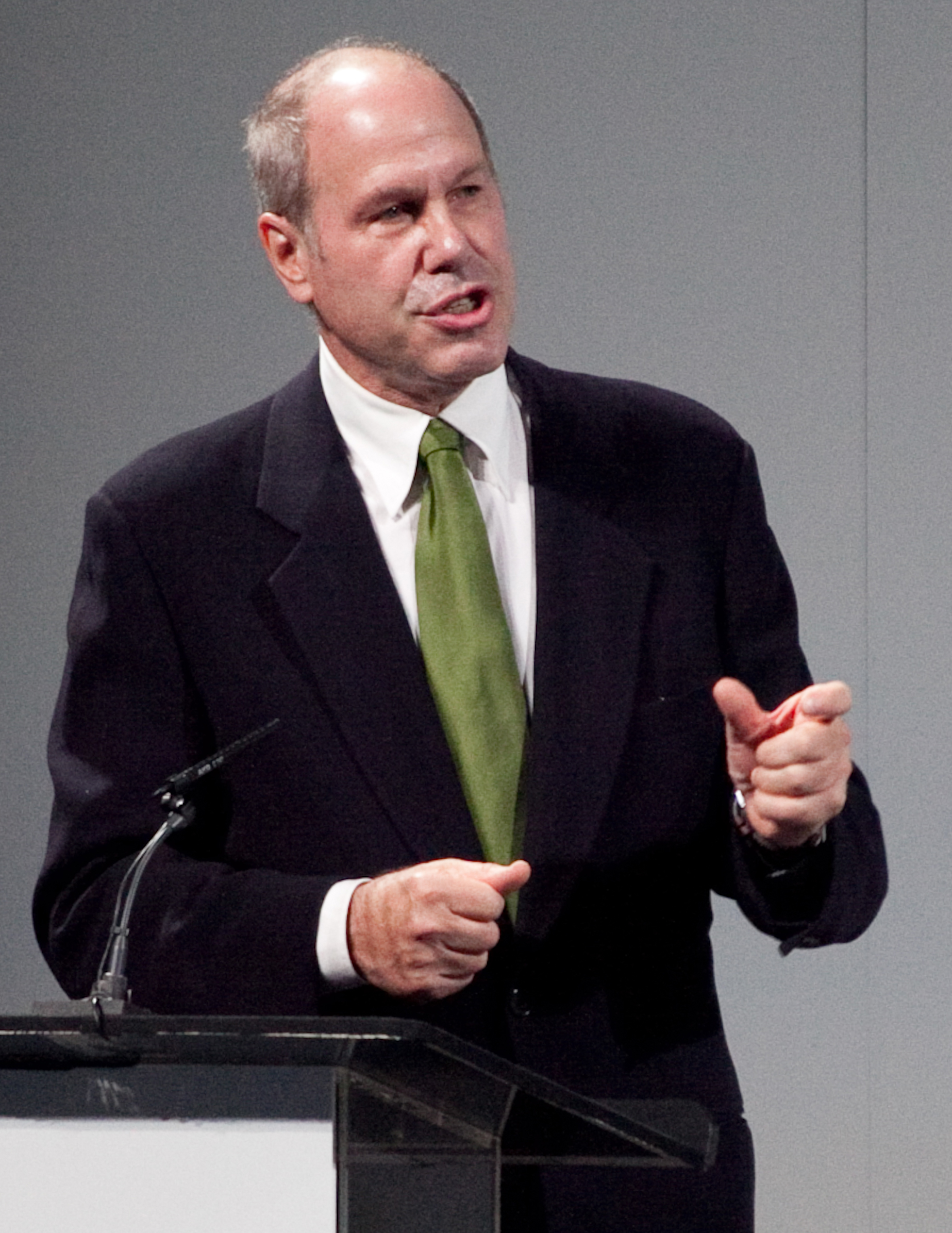
Michael Eisner

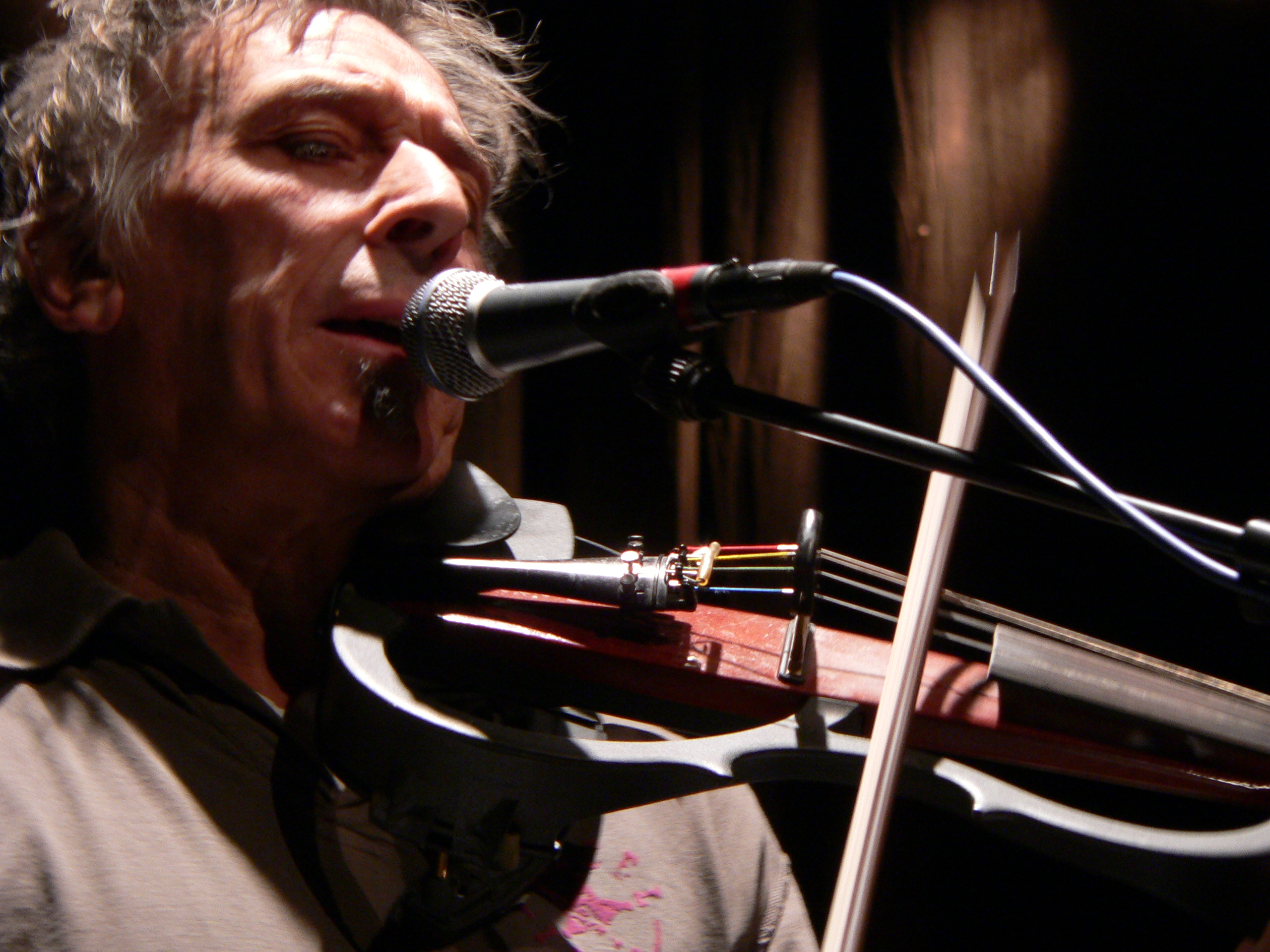
John Cale

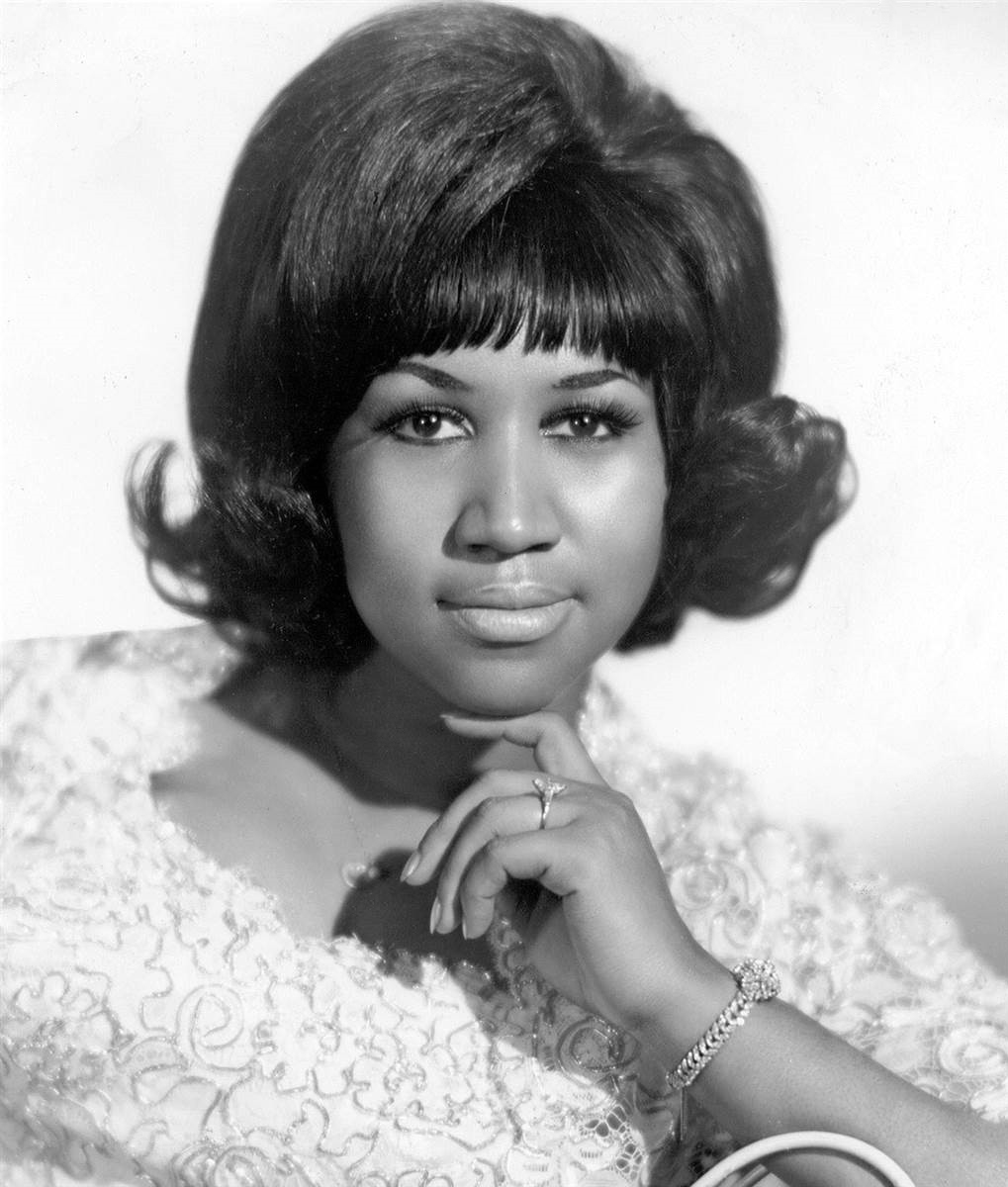
Aretha Franklin

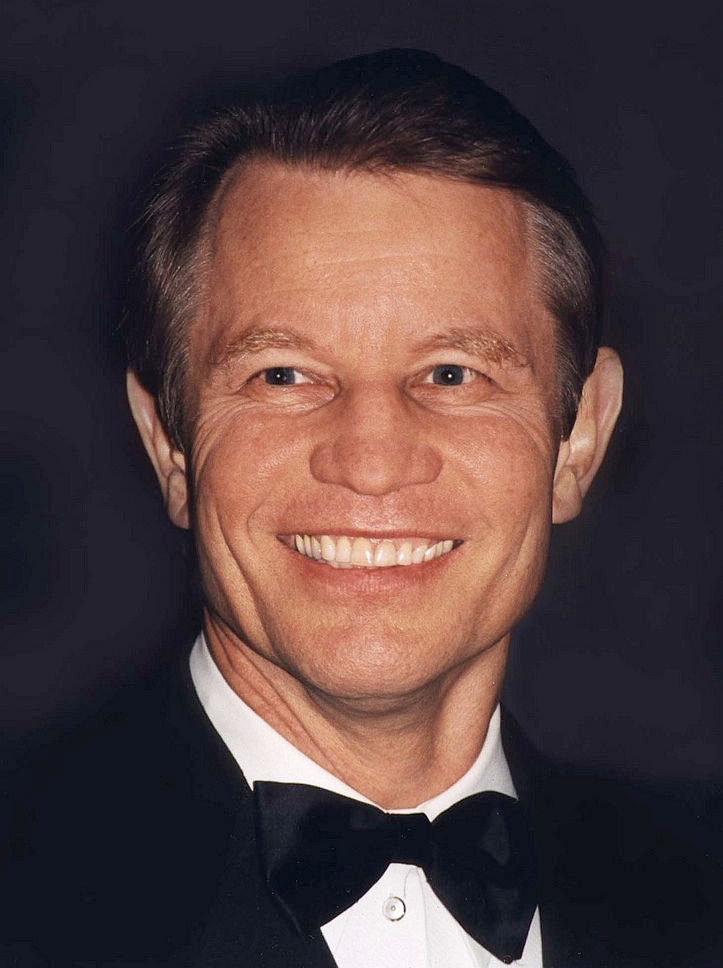
Michael York

- March 2
  - John Irving, American author
  - Lou Reed, American singer-songwriter and guitarist (d. 2013)
- March 5
  - Felipe González, Prime Minister of Spain
  - Mike Resnick, American science fiction author (d. 2020)
- March 7
  - Tammy Faye Bakker, American evangelist, singer and television personality (d. 2007)
  - Michael Eisner, American film studio executive
- March 9 – John Cale, Welsh composer and musician
- March 12 – Ratko Mladić, Bosnian Serb military leader and war criminal (d. 2026)
- March 13
  - Charles Brandt, American investigator, lawyer, writer, and speaker.
  - Dave Cutler, American software engineer
  - Scatman John, American musician (d. 1999)
- March 16 – James Soong, Taiwan politician
- March 17 – John Wayne Gacy, American serial killer (d. 1994)
- March 19 – José Serra, Brazilian politician
- March 23
  - Walter Rodney, Guyanese historian and political figure
  - Michael Haneke, Austrian director and screenwriter
- March 25
  - Aretha Franklin, American singer, songwriter, actress, and civil rights activist (d. 2018)
  - Richard O'Brien, English-New Zealand actor
- March 26
  - Erica Jong, American author
  - Edvard Schiffauer, Czech composer
- March 27
  - John E. Sulston, British chemist; recipient of the Nobel Prize in Physiology or Medicine (d. 2018)
  - Michael York, English actor
- March 28
  - Daniel Dennett, American philosopher (d. 2024)
  - Neil Kinnock, British Labour leader
  - Mike Newell, British film director
  - Jerry Sloan, American basketball player and coach (d. 2020)
- March 29
  - Kenichi Ogata, Japanese voice actor
  - Scott Wilson, American actor (d. 2018)
- March 30 – Ruben Kun, Nauruan politician and former President of Nauru

=== April ===
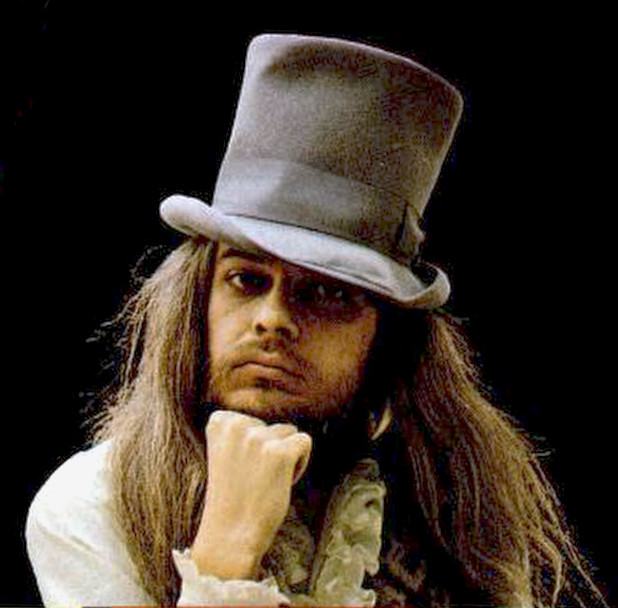
Leon Russell

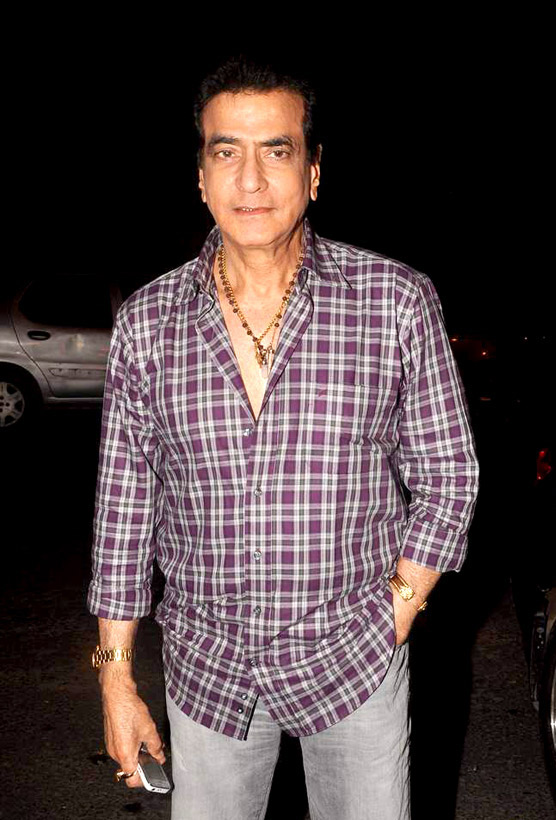
Jeetendra

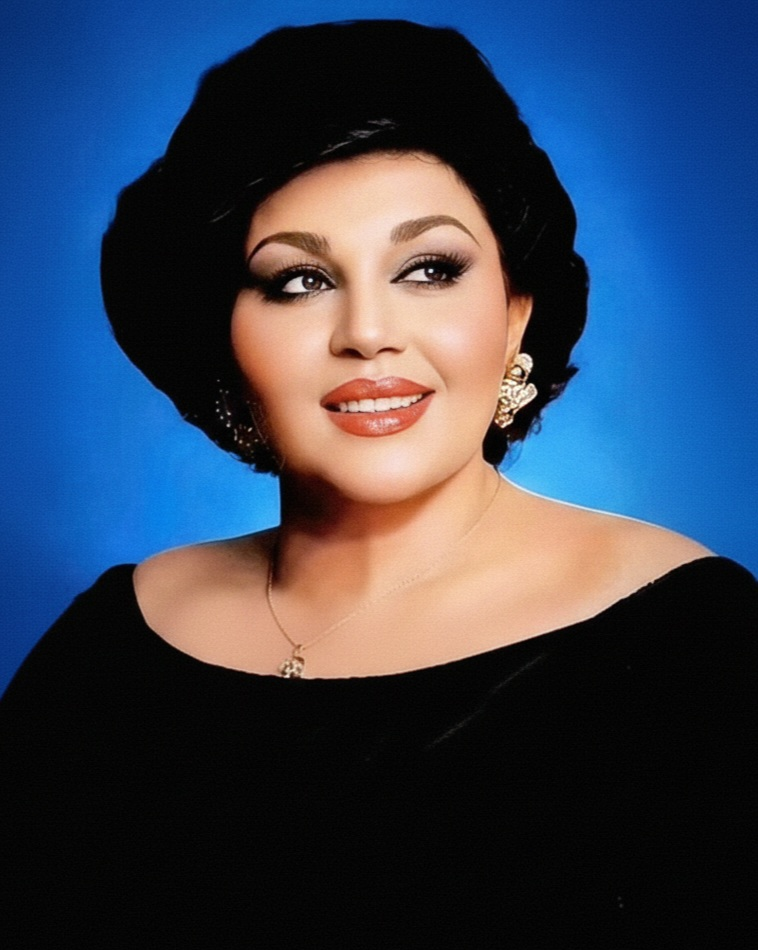
Hayedeh

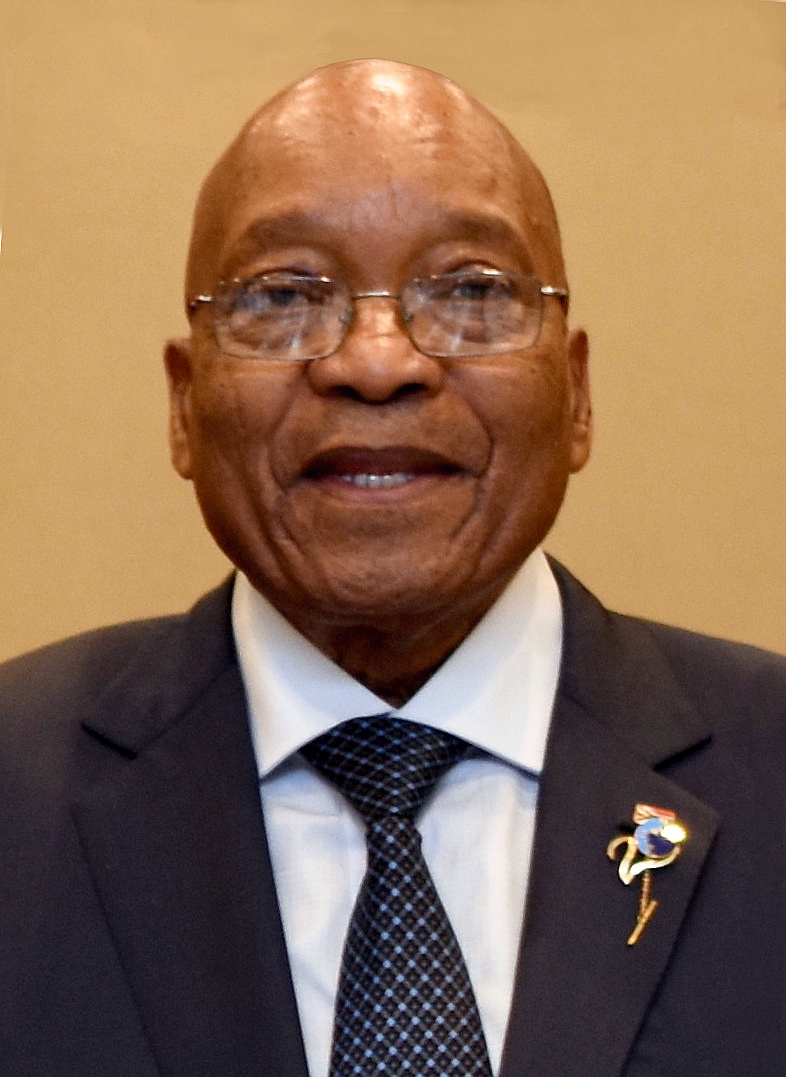
Jacob Zuma

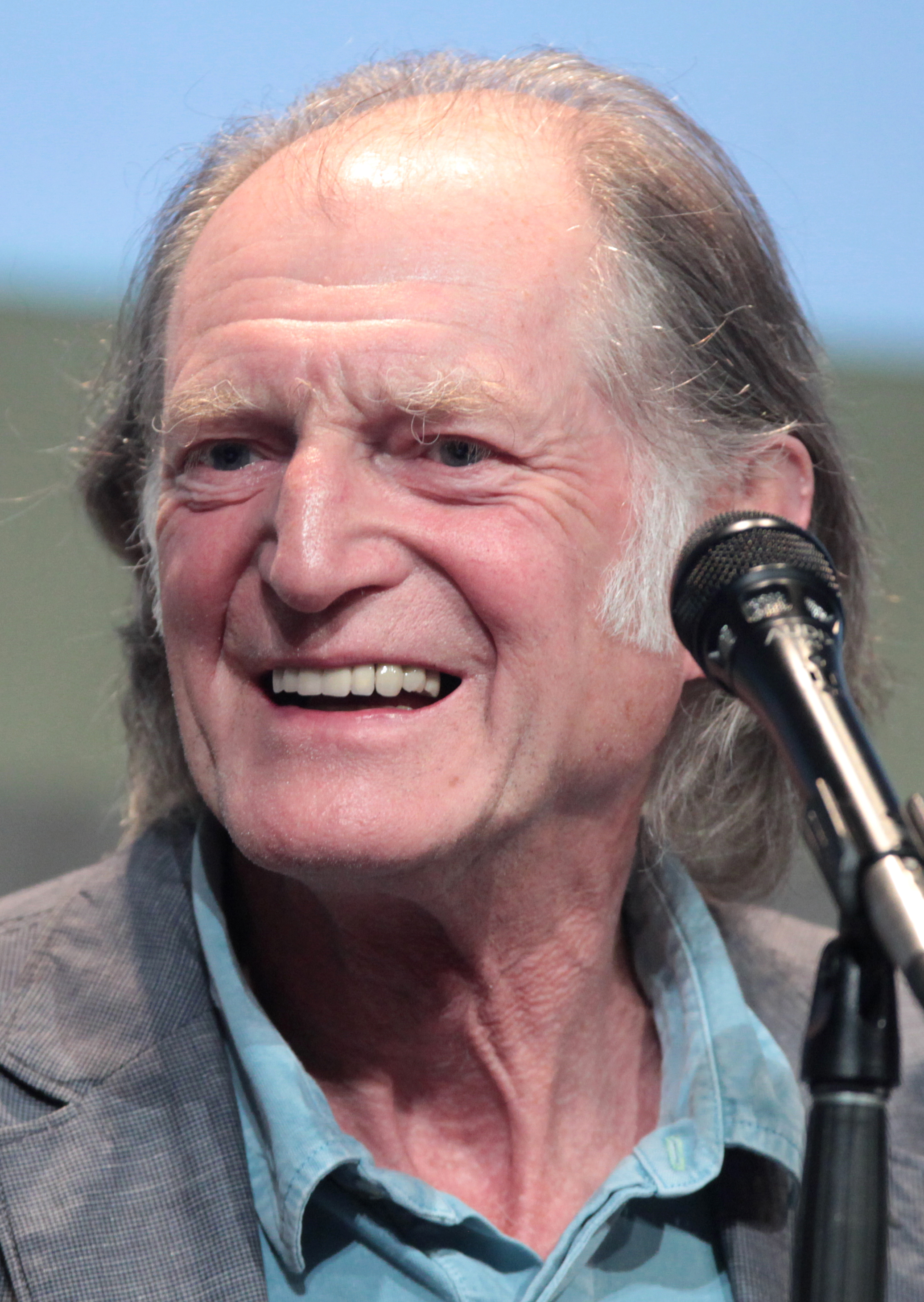
David Bradley

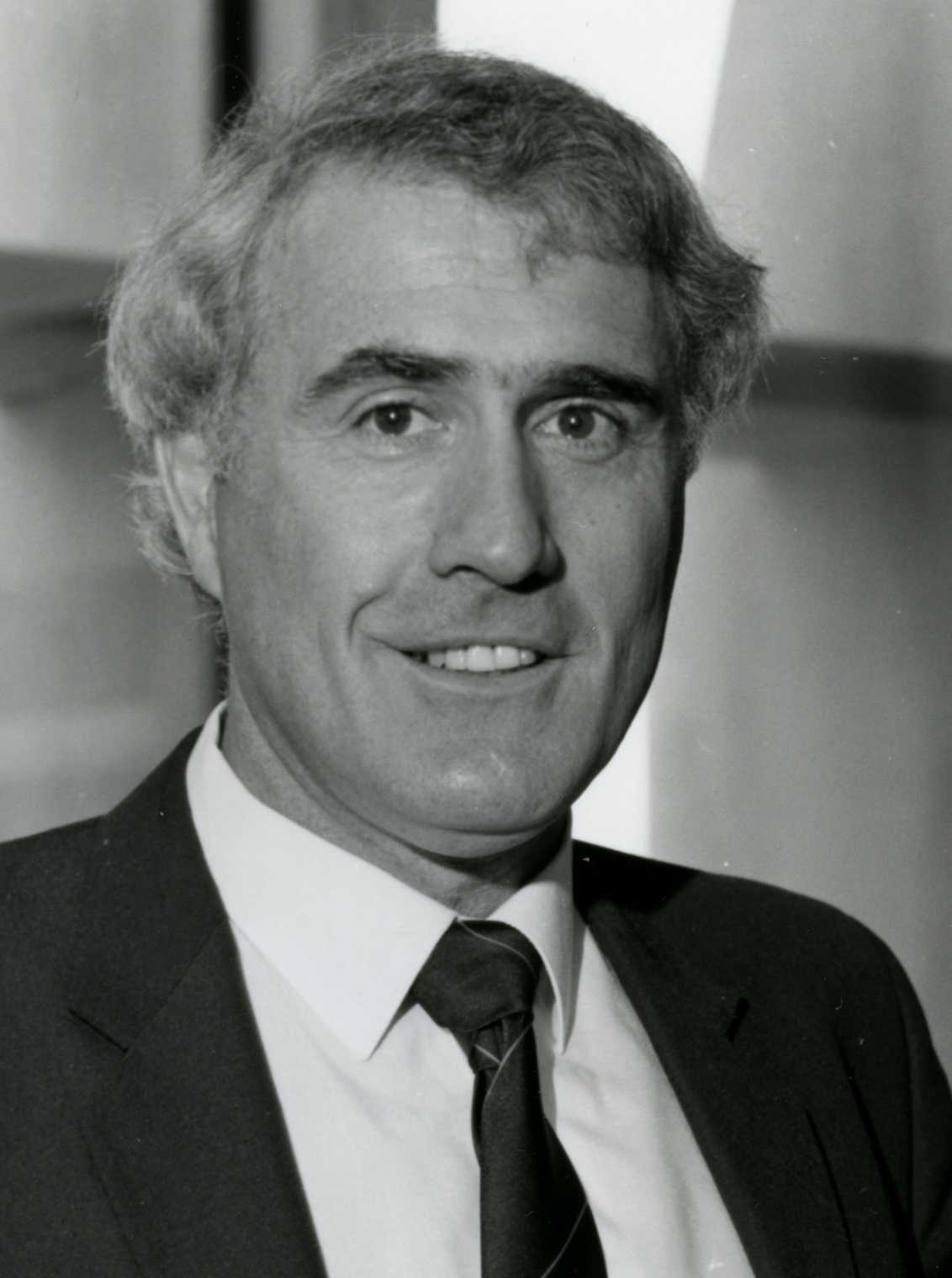
Geoffrey Palmer

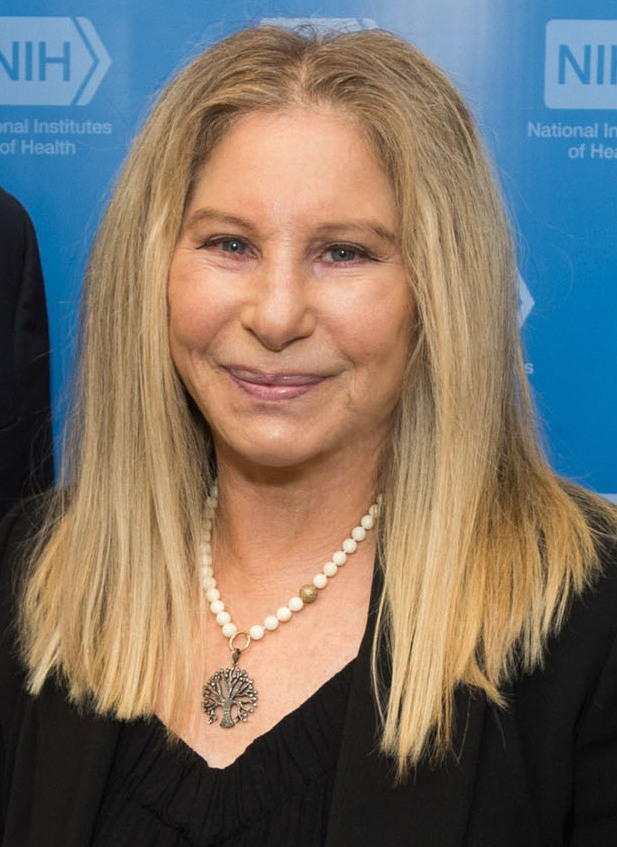
Barbra Streisand

- April 1 – Samuel R. Delany, American science fiction author
- April 2 – Leon Russell, American singer, songwriter, pianist and guitarist (d. 2016)
- April 3
  - Marsha Mason, American actress
  - Wayne Newton, American entertainer and singer
- April 5 – Peter Greenaway, English filmmaker and artist
- April 6
  - Barry Levinson, American film producer and director
  - Anita Pallenberg, German-Italian actress, artist, and model (d. 2017)
- April 7 – Jeetendra, Indian actor
- April 8 – Douglas Trumbull, American film director and special effects artist (d. 2022)
- April 10 – Hayedeh, Iranian singer (d. 1990)
- April 12
  - Carlos Reutemann, Argentine racing driver and politician (d. 2021)
  - Jacob Zuma, 4th President of South Africa
- April 14
  - Valeriy Brumel, Russian athlete (d. 2003)
  - Valentin Lebedev, Russian cosmonaut
- April 15 – Julie Sommars, American actress
- April 17
  - Kenas Aroi, Nauruan politician (d. 1991)
  - David Bradley, English actor
- April 18
  - Jeff Kimpel, American atmospheric scientist (d. 2020)
  - Jochen Rindt, German-born racing driver (d. 1970)
- April 19 – Alan Price, English musician and keyboardist
- April 20
  - Casimir Oyé-Mba, 3rd Prime Minister of Gabon (d. 2021)
  - Arto Paasilinna, Finnish author (d. 2018)
- April 21 – Geoffrey Palmer, 33rd Prime Minister of New Zealand
- April 22 – Rudolf Jaenisch, German-American biologist
- April 23 – Sandra Dee, American actress (d. 2005)
- April 24 – Barbra Streisand, American singer, actress, composer, and film director
- April 26 – Bobby Rydell, American singer (d. 2022)
- April 27 – Valeri Polyakov, Russian cosmonaut (d. 2022)
- April 29 – Galina Kulakova, Soviet athlete

=== May ===
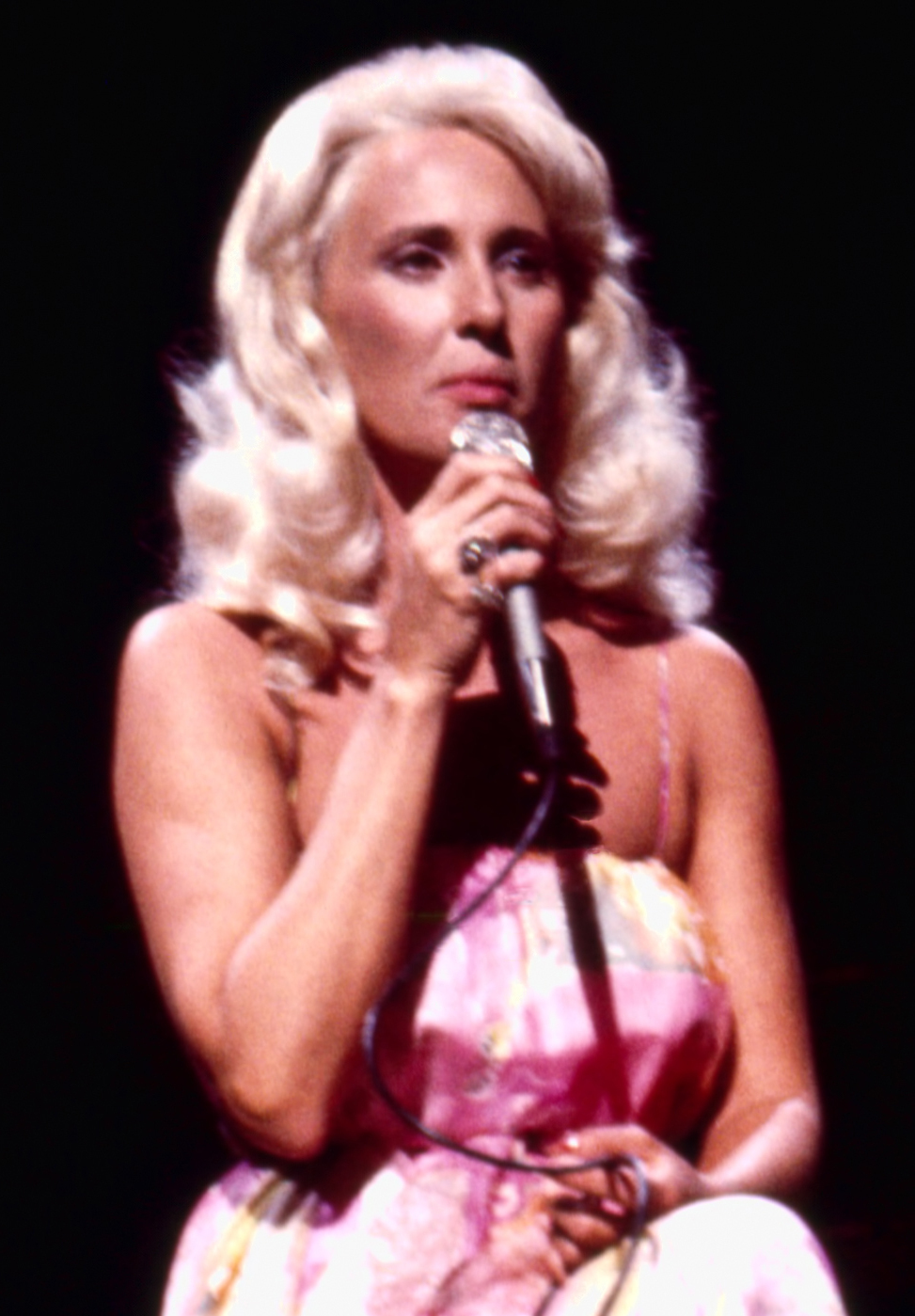
Tammy Wynette

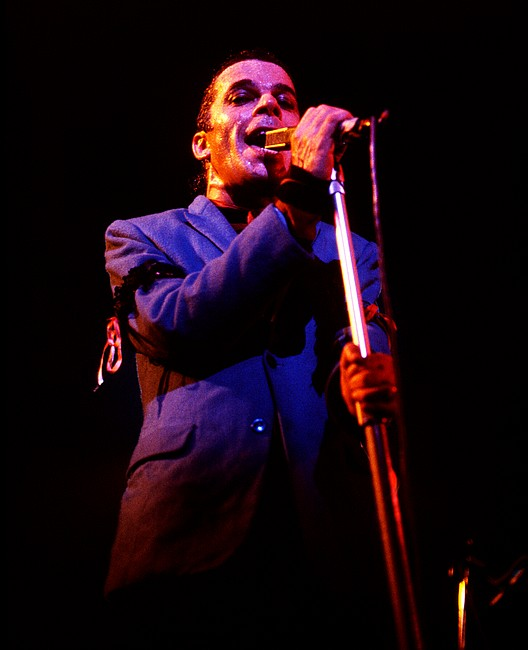
Ian Dury

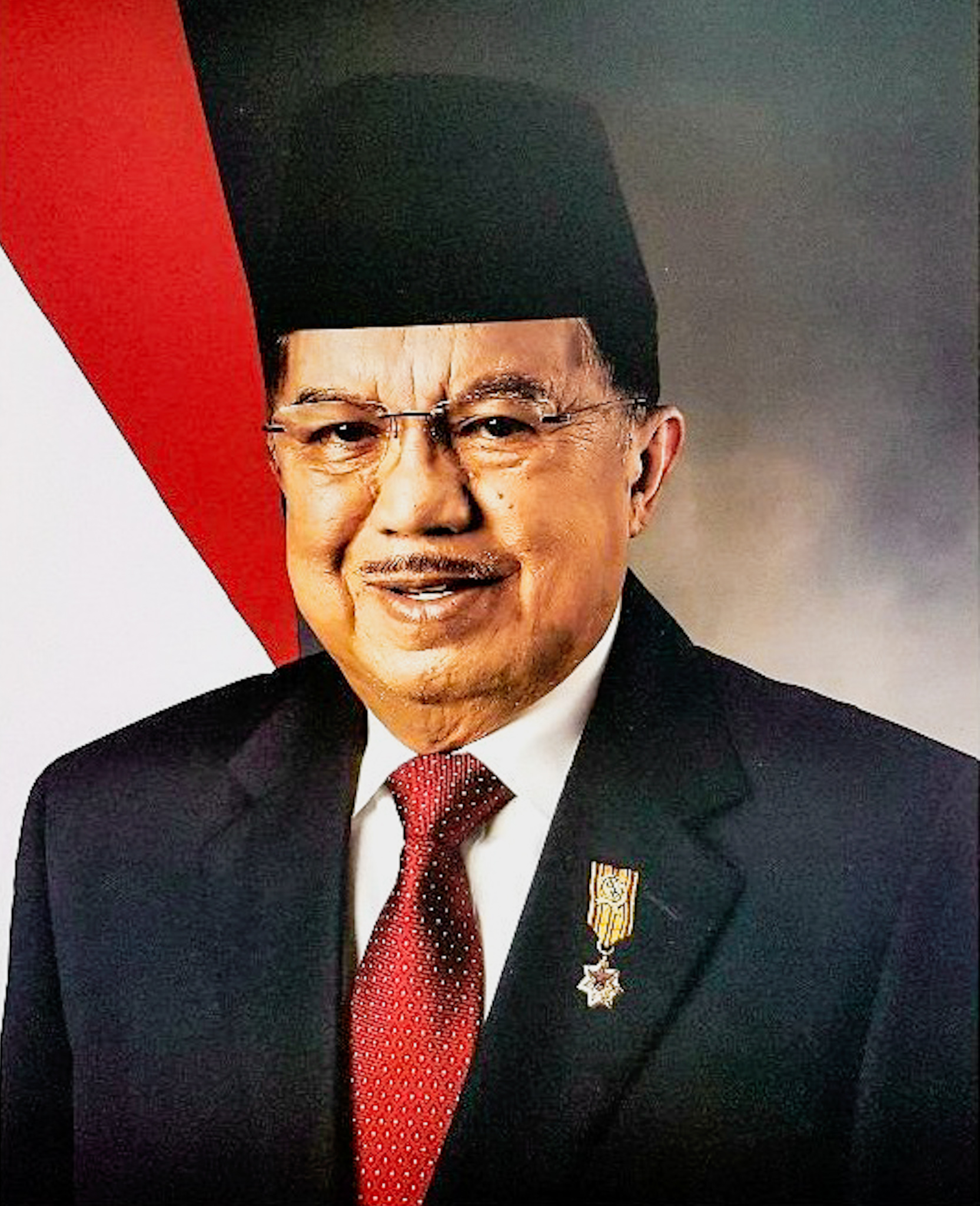
Jusuf Kalla

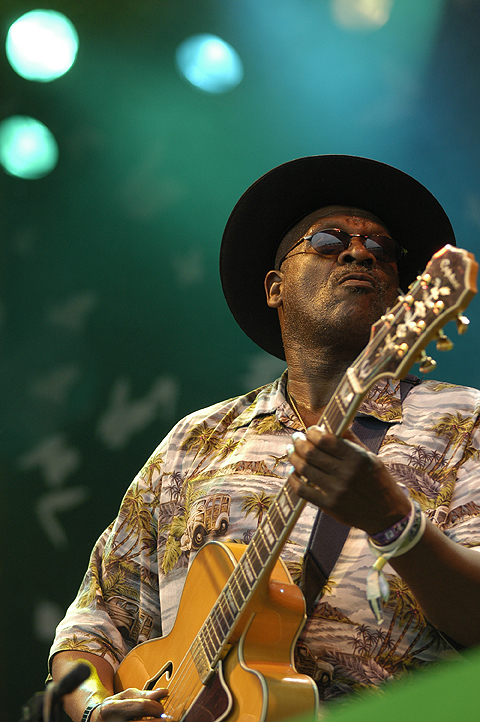
Taj Mahal

- May 1 – Jean Saubert, American alpine ski racer (d. 2007)
- May 2 – Jacques Rogge, 8th President of the International Olympic Committee (d. 2021)
- May 3 – Věra Čáslavská, Czech gymnast (d. 2016)
- May 5 – Tammy Wynette, American country singer (d. 1998)
- May 6 – Ariel Dorfman, Argentine/Chilean novelist, playwright and essayist
- May 8 – Terry Neill, Northern Irish footballer and manager (d. 2022)
- May 9
  - Tommy Roe, American singer-songwriter
  - John Ashcroft, 79th United States Attorney General
- May 12 – Ian Dury, British musician (d. 2000)
- May 13 – Vladimir Dzhanibekov, Soviet cosmonaut
- May 15
  - Barnabas Sibusiso Dlamini, 2-Time Prime Minister of Swaziland (d. 2018)
  - Anthony W. England, American astronaut
  - Jusuf Kalla, 10th and 12th Vice President of Indonesia
- May 17
  - Philippe Gondet, French footballer (d. 2018)
  - Taj Mahal, African-American singer and guitarist
- May 19 – Gary Kildall, American computer scientist and microcomputer entrepreneur (d. 1994)
- May 20
  - Lynn Davies, Welsh track and field athlete
  - Carlos Hathcock, American Marine sniper (d. 1999)
  - David Proval, American actor
- May 21 – Robert C. Springer, American astronaut and test pilot
- May 22
  - Ted Kaczynski, American domestic terrorist, mathematics professor, and anarchist author (d. 2023)
  - Barbara Parkins, Canadian actress
- May 24
  - Ichirō Ozawa, Japanese politician
  - Fraser Stoddart, Scottish-born scientist, recipient of the Nobel Prize in Chemistry (d. 2024)
- May 25 – José Mário Branco, Portuguese singer-songwriter, actor, and record producer (d. 2019)
- May 28 – Stanley B. Prusiner, American scientist, recipient of the Nobel Prize in Physiology or Medicine
- May 29 – Kevin Conway, American actor and director (d. 2020)

=== June ===
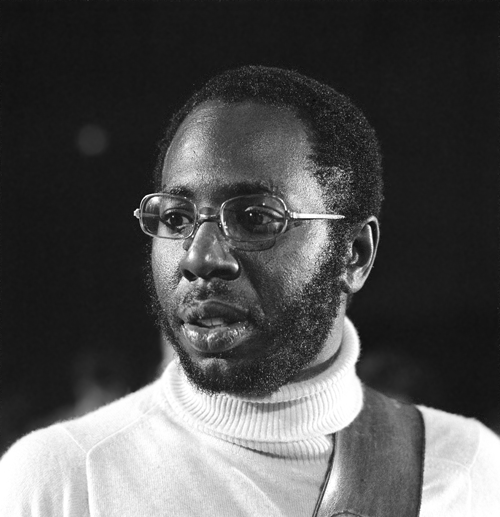
Curtis Mayfield

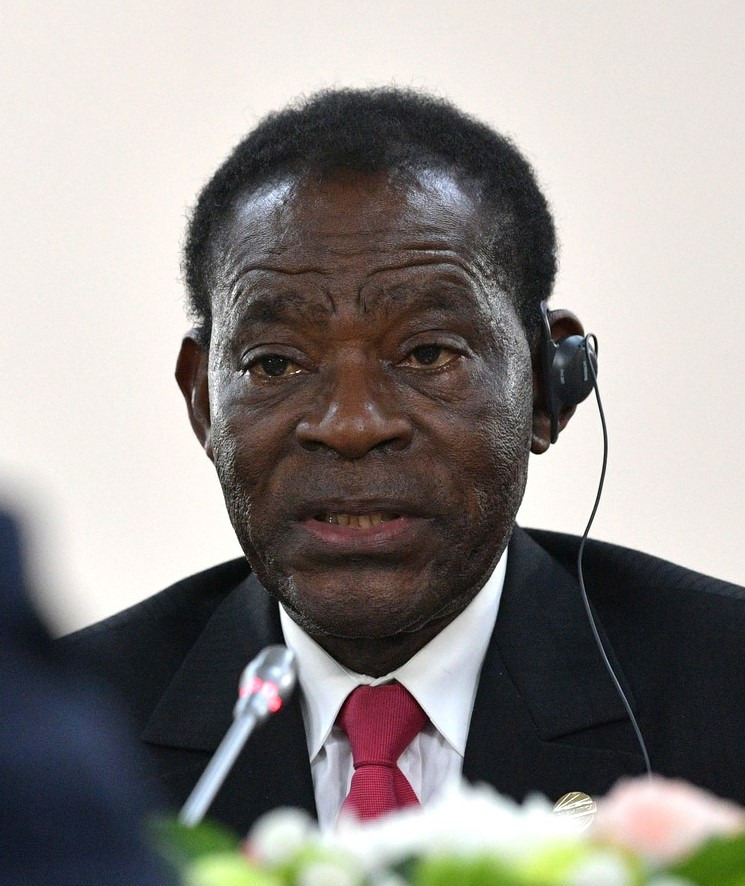
Teodoro Obiang Nguema Mbasogo

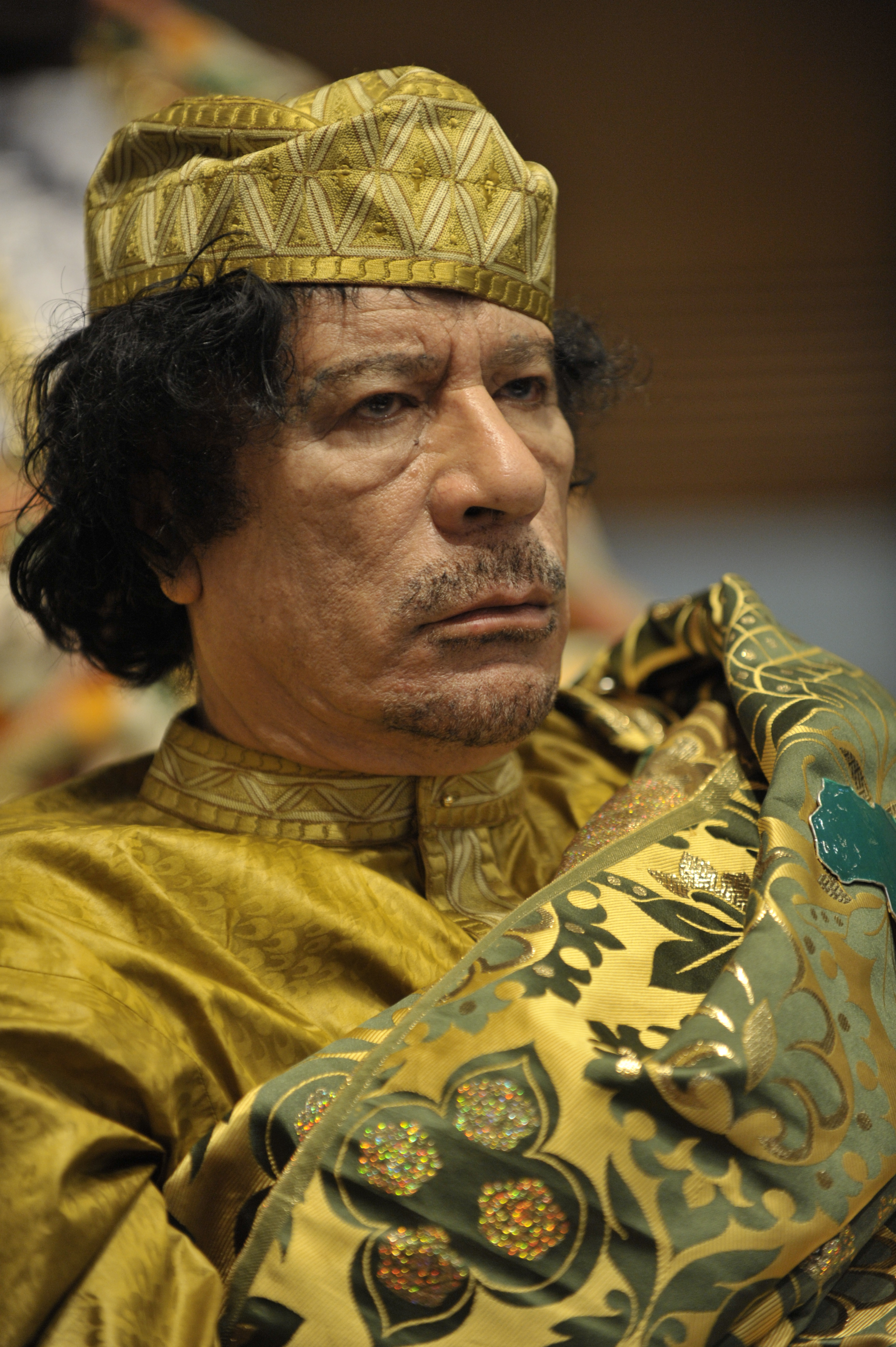
Muammar Gaddafi

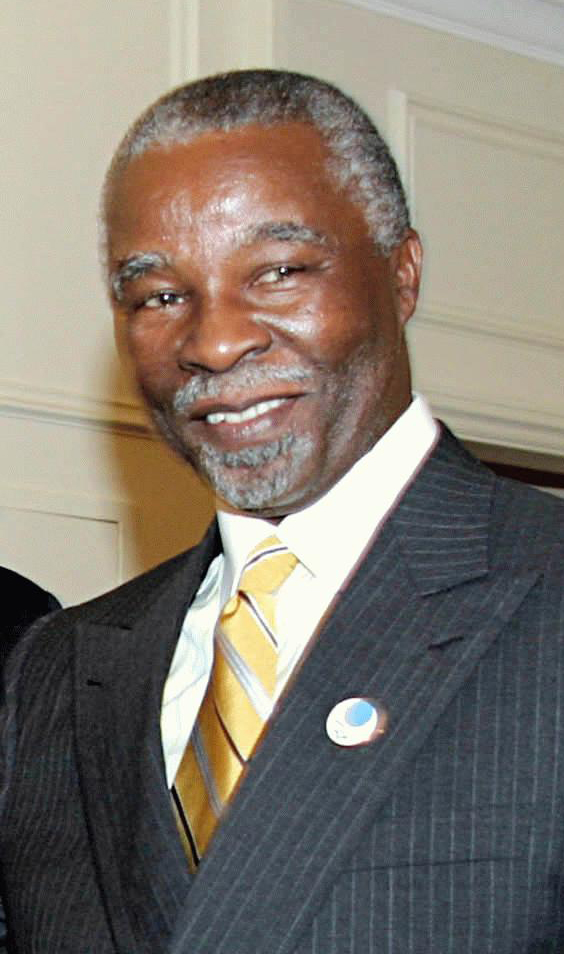
Thabo Mbeki

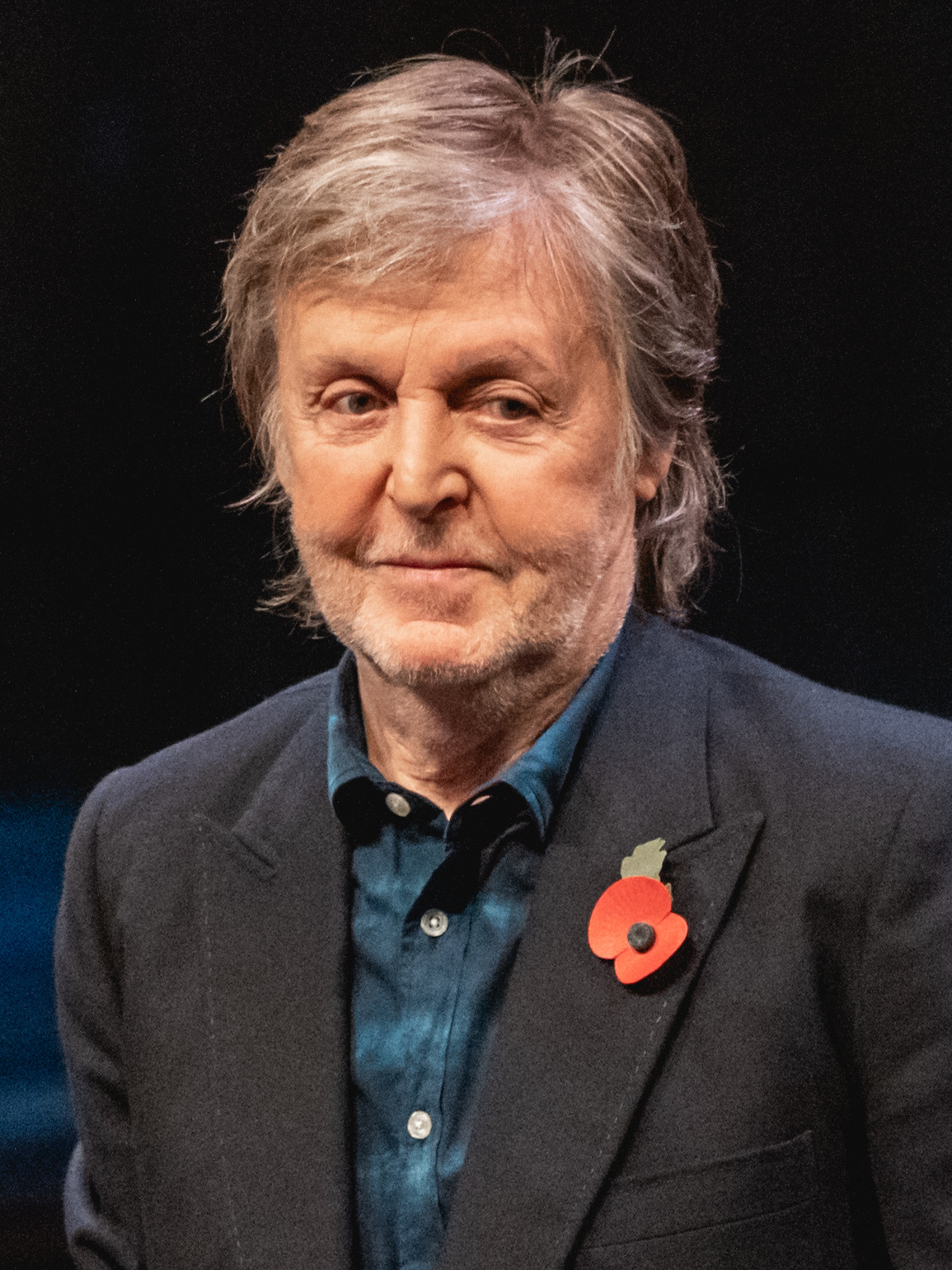
Sir Paul McCartney

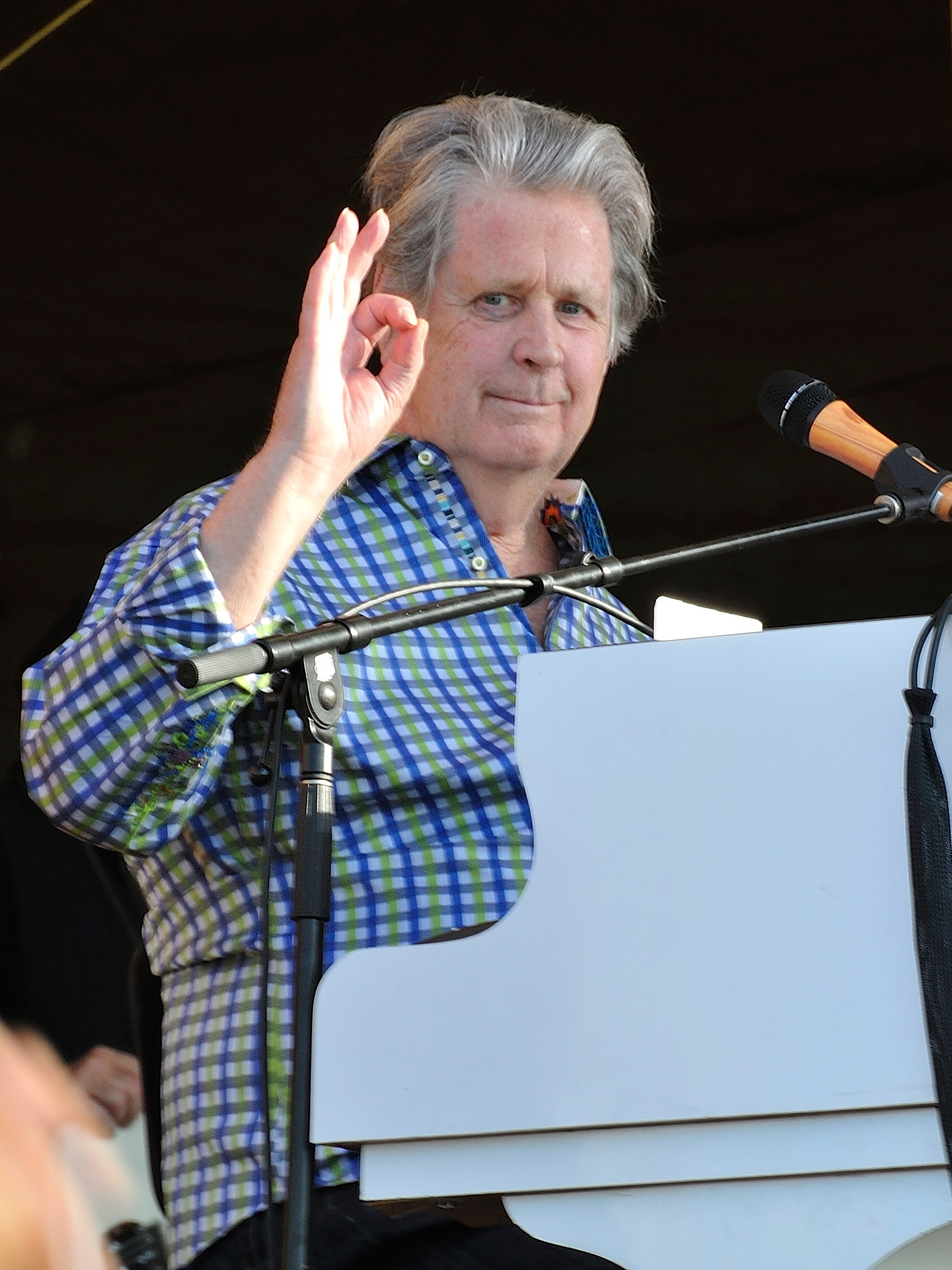
Brian Wilson

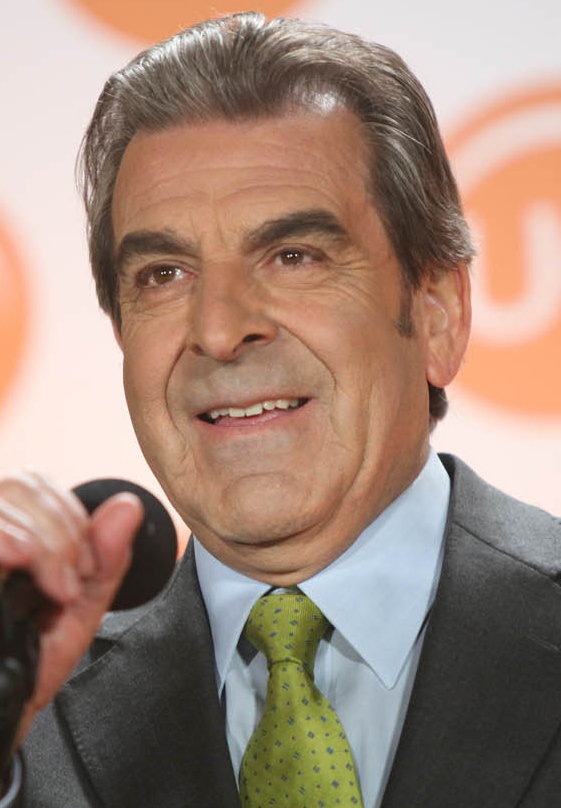
Eduardo Frei Ruiz-Tagle

- June 2
  - Tony Buzan, English author and educational consultant (d. 2019)
  - Eduard Malofeyev, Russian footballer and coach
- June 3 – Curtis Mayfield, African-American musician (d. 1999)
- June 5 – Teodoro Obiang Nguema Mbasogo, President of Equatorial Guinea and Chairperson of the African Union
- June 6 – Sandra Morgan, Australian swimmer
- June 7
  - Muammar Gaddafi, Libyan revolutionary, politician, and political theorist (d. 2011)
  - Anneke Grönloh, Dutch singer (d. 2018)
- June 8 – Jacques Dubochet, Swiss biophysicist, recipient of the Nobel Prize in Chemistry
- June 10
  - Preston Manning, Canadian politician
  - Anthony J. Alvarado, American educator, New York City Schools Chancellor (1983–1984) (d. 2024)
- June 12 – Bert Sakmann, German physiologist, recipient of the Nobel Prize in Physiology or Medicine
- June 13 – Abdulsalami Abubakar, President of Nigeria
- June 14 – Andy Irvine, Irish folk musician
- June 16
  - Giacomo Agostini, Italian motorcycle racer
  - John Rostill, English bassist, musician and composer (d. 1973)
- June 17 – Mohamed El Baradei, Egyptian International Atomic Energy Agency director, recipient of the Nobel Peace Prize
- June 18
  - Roger Ebert, American film critic and television personality (d. 2013)
  - Thabo Mbeki, South African politician and 12th President of South Africa
  - Paul McCartney, English musician and composer
  - Carl Radle, American bass guitarist
  - Nick Tate, Australian actor
  - Hans Vonk, Dutch conductor (d. 2004)
- June 20 – Brian Wilson, American singer, composer and producer (The Beach Boys) (d. 2025)
- June 21
  - Paul Chernoff, American mathematician and poet (d. 2017)
  - Flaviano Vicentini, Italian cyclist (d. 2002)
- June 22
  - Toyohiro Akiyama, Japanese cosmonaut
  - Eumir Deodato, Brazilian pianist, composer, arranger and producer
  - Laila Freivalds, Swedish politician
- June 23 – Martin Rees, British cosmologist and astrophysicist
- June 24
  - Michele Lee, American actress and singer
  - Eduardo Frei Ruiz-Tagle, Chilean politician and 33rd President of Chile
- June 25
  - Willis Reed, African-American basketball player, coach and general manager (d. 2023)
  - Michel Tremblay, French-Canadian novelist and playwright
- June 26
  - Gilberto Gil, Brazilian singer, politician
  - Larry Taylor, American bass guitarist (Canned Heat) (d. 2019)
- June 27 – Bruce Johnston, American singer and songwriter (The Beach Boys)
- June 28
  - Chris Hani, South African politician (d. 1993)
  - Rupert Sheldrake, British biochemist
  - Frank Zane, American professional bodybuilder and author
- June 30
  - Robert Ballard, American explorer, Navy officer and professor
  - Jean-Baptiste Ouédraogo, 4th President of Burkina Faso
  - Friedrich von Thun, Austrian actor

=== July ===
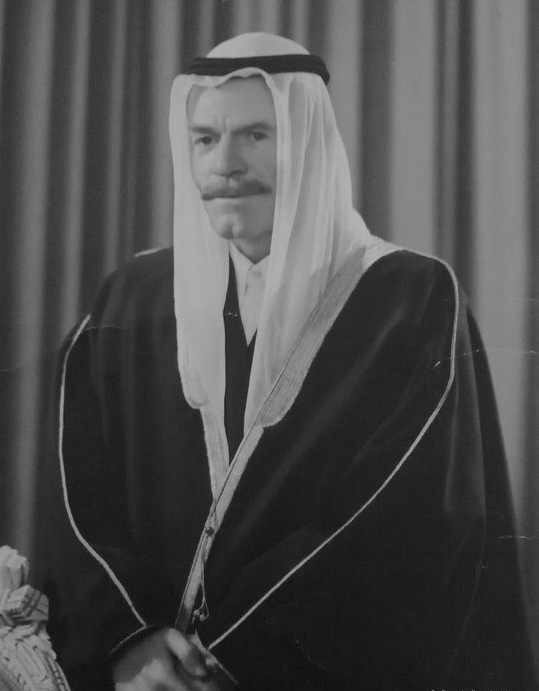
Izzat Ibrahim al-Douri

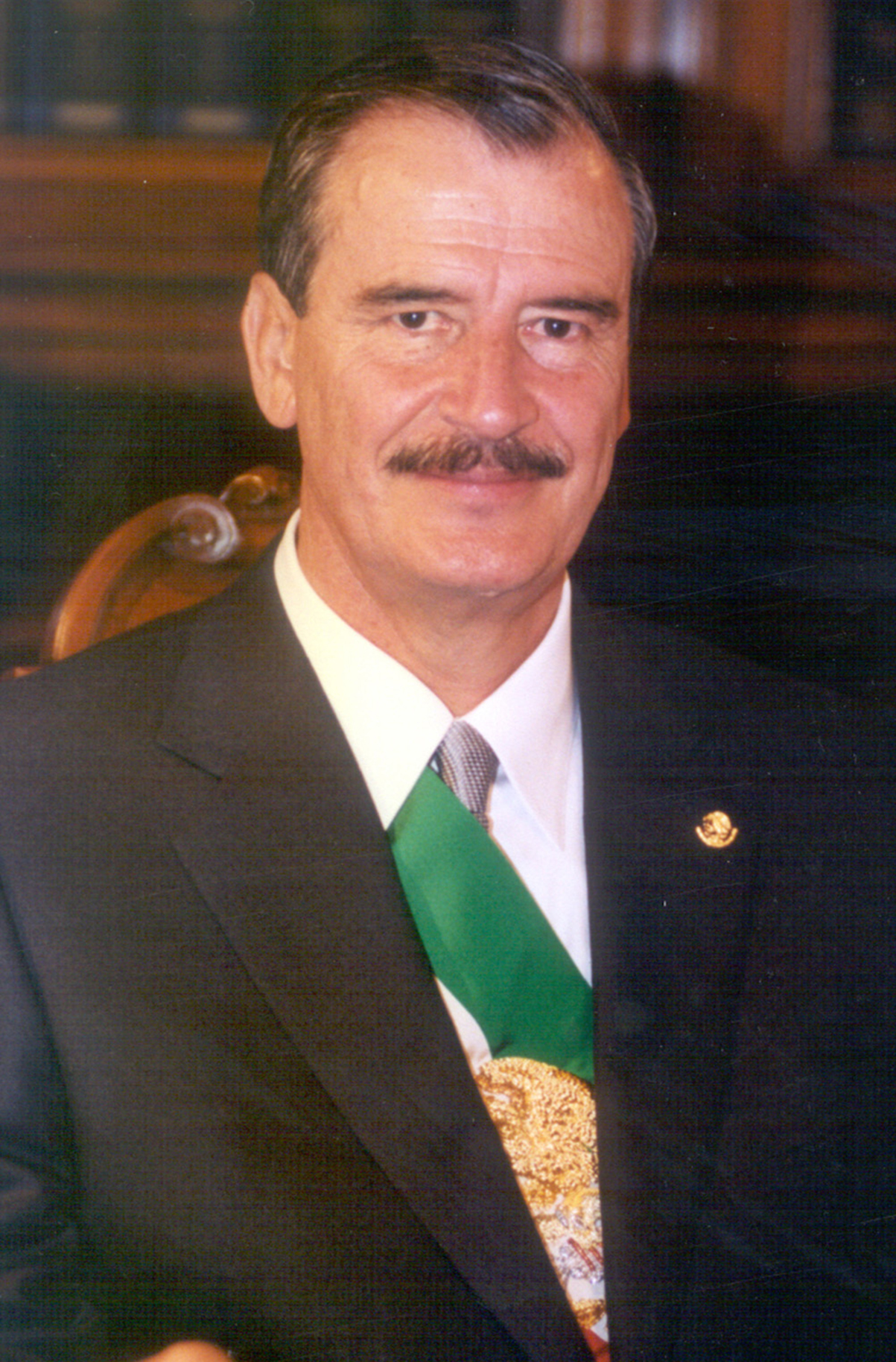
Vicente Fox

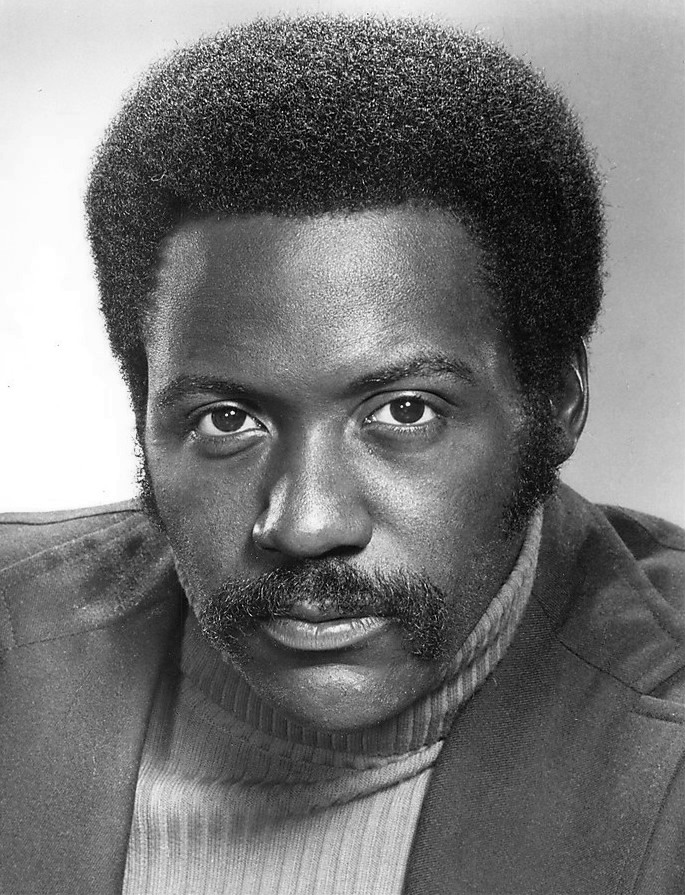
Richard Roundtree

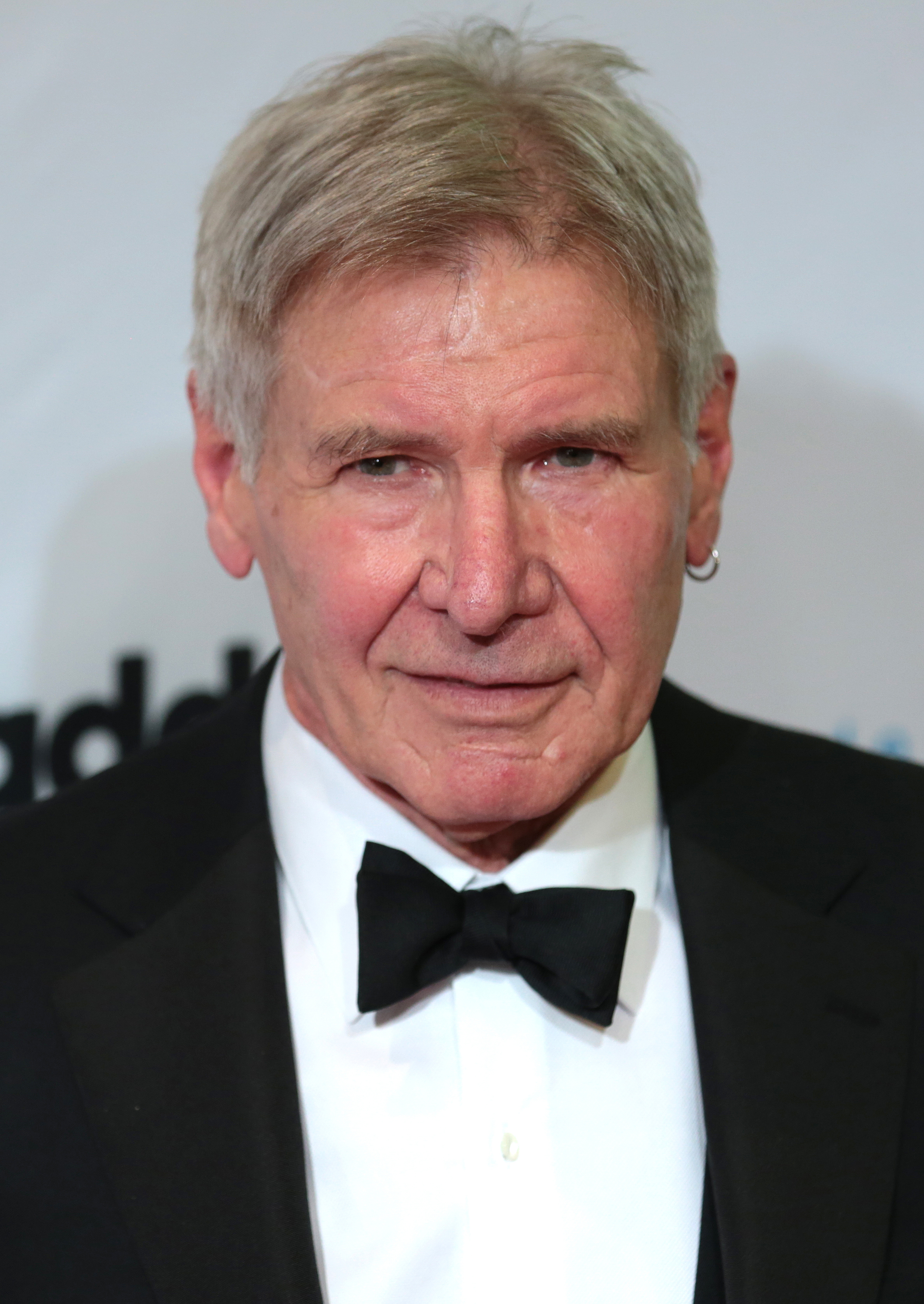
Harrison Ford

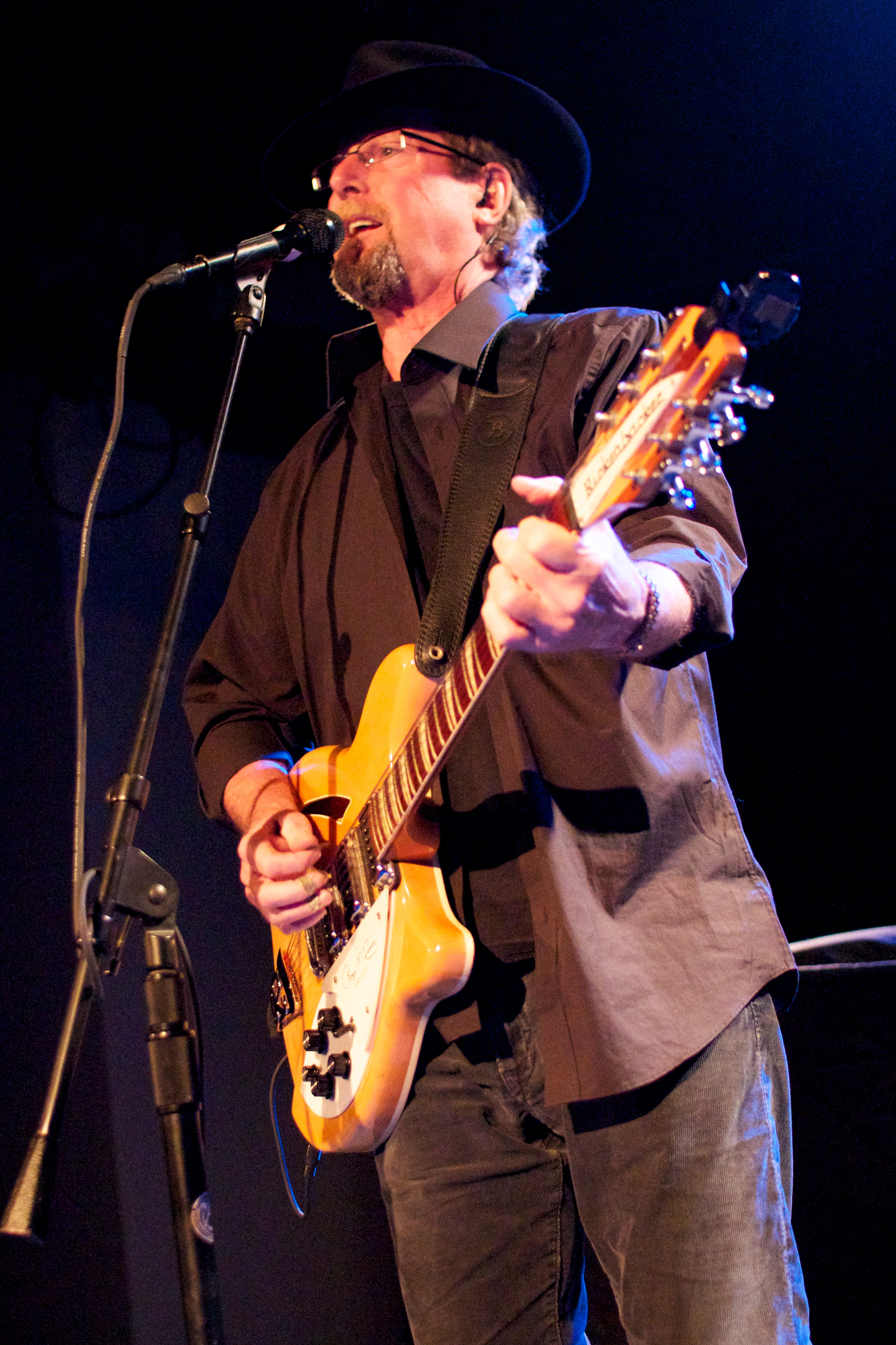
Roger McGuinn

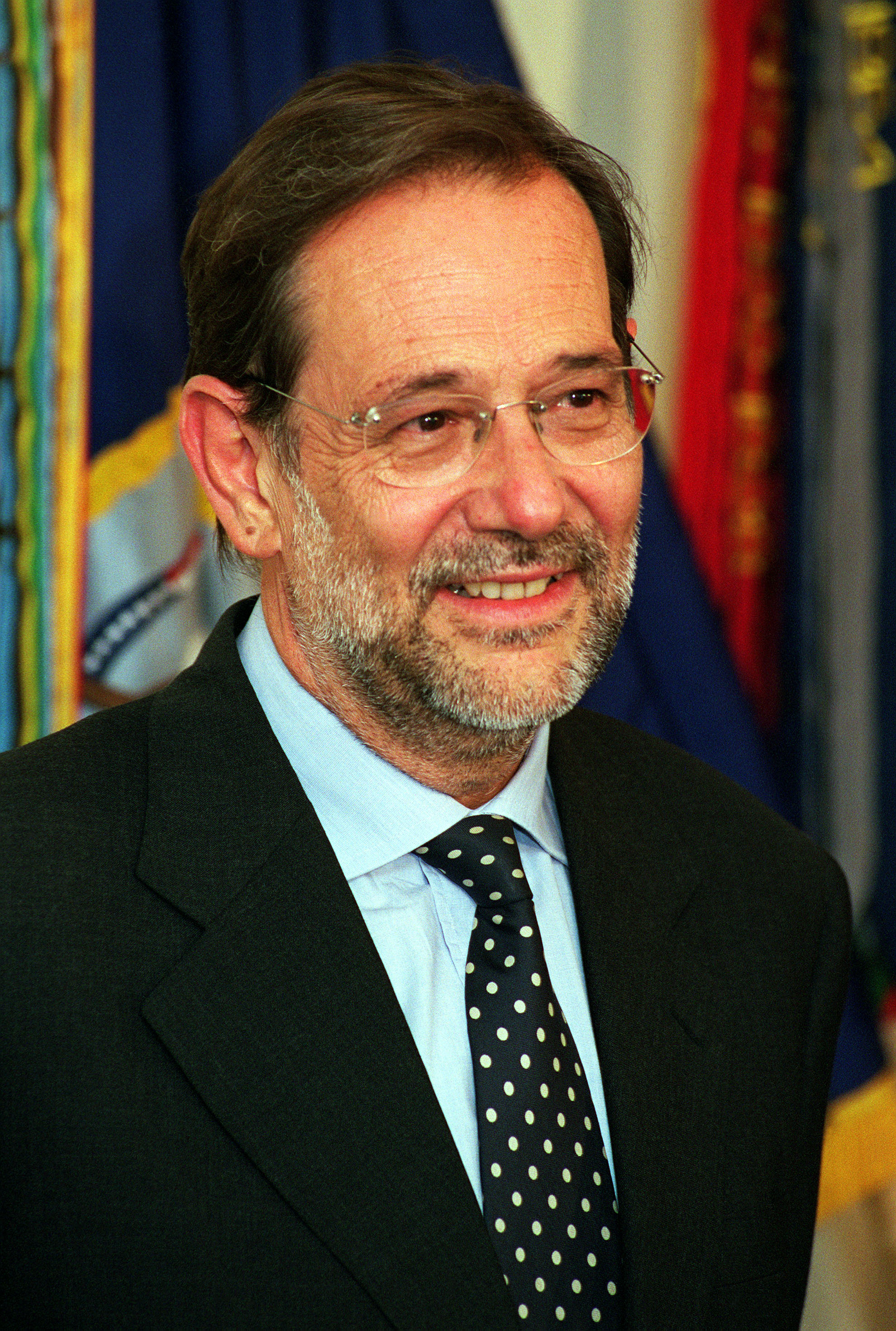
Javier Solana

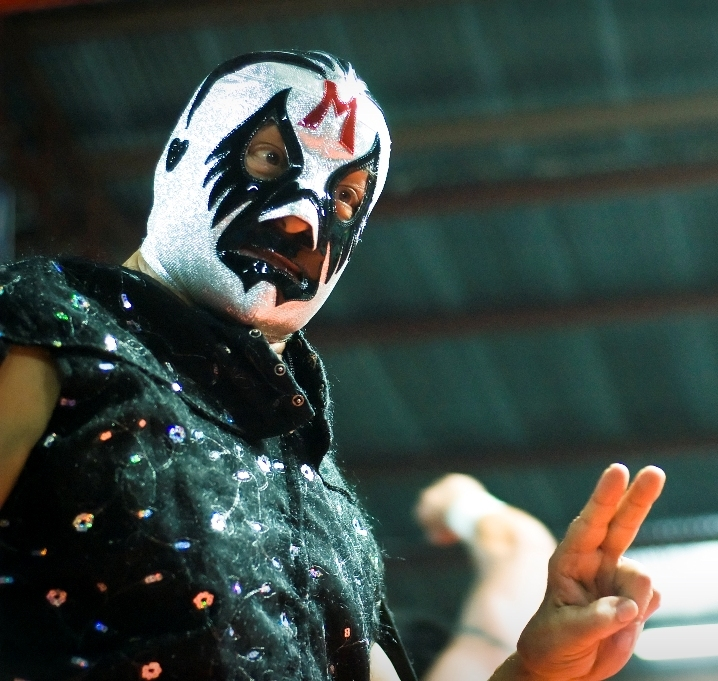
Mil Mascaras

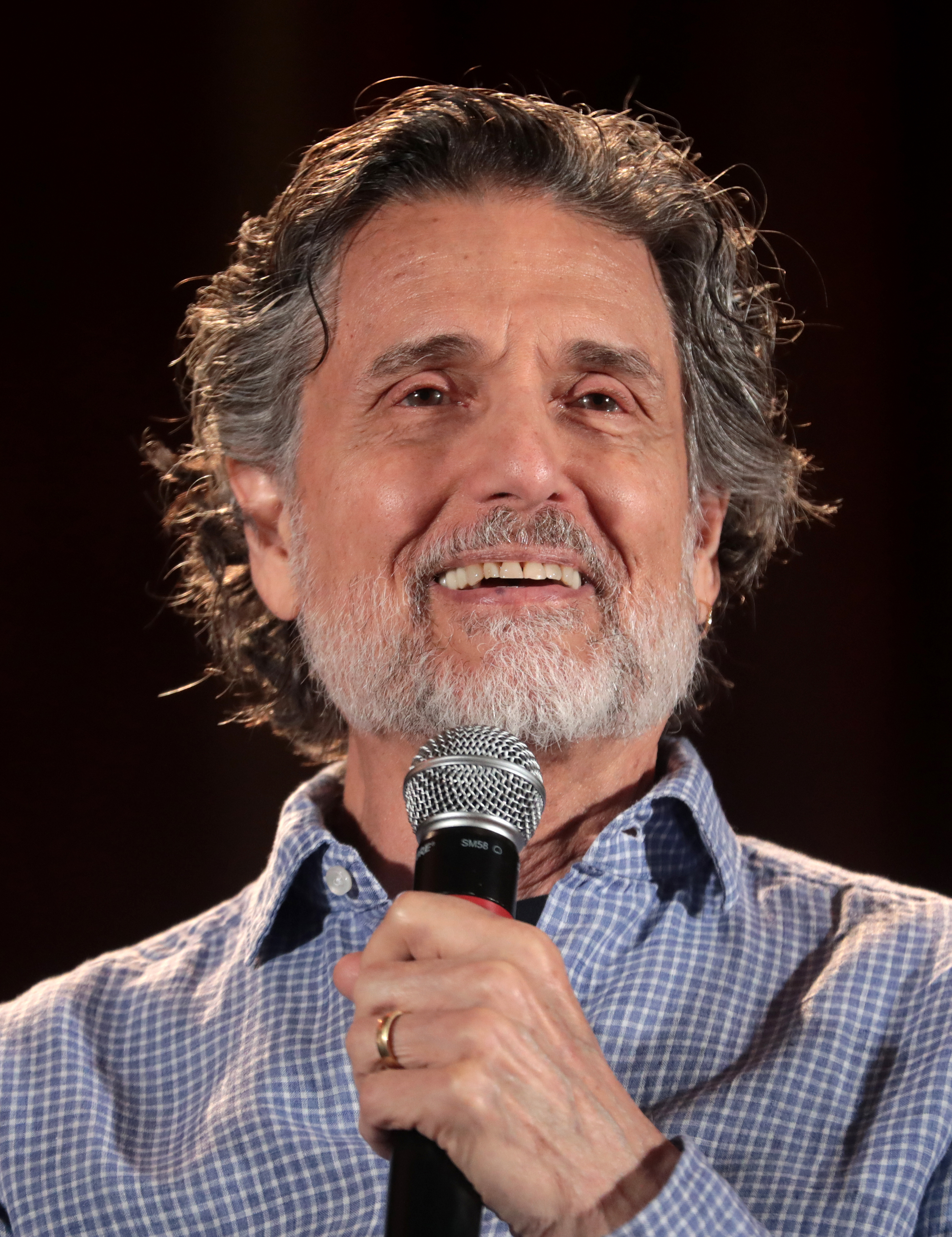
Chris Sarandon

- July 1
  - Geneviève Bujold, Canadian actress
  - Andraé Crouch, American gospel singer (d. 2015)
  - Izzat Ibrahim al-Douri, 6th Vice President of Iraq (d. 2020)
  - Wim T. Schippers, Dutch artist, comedian, television director, and voice actor
  - Timothy Yang, Taiwanese diplomat and politician
- July 2
  - Vicente Fox, 55th President of Mexico
  - Ahmet Türk, Kurdish nationalist
  - Juan Cutillas, footballer and Spanish soccer coach
- July 3 – Eddy Mitchell, French singer and actor
- July 4 – Prince Michael of Kent
- July 5 – Hannes Löhr, German footballer (d. 2016)
- July 6 – Raymond Depardon, French photographer, photojournalist and documentary filmmaker
- July 7
  - Carmen Duncan, Australian actress and activist (d. 2019)
  - Abdul Hamid II, Pakistani field hockey player
- July 9 – Richard Roundtree, American actor (d. 2023)
- July 10
  - Ronnie James Dio, American musician (d. 2010)
  - Pyotr Klimuk, Russian cosmonaut
  - Mirjana Marković, Serbian politician, 3rd First Lady of Yugoslavia (d. 2019)
  - Lopo do Nascimento, 1st Prime Minister of Angola
  - Sixto Rodriguez, American singer-songwriter (d. 2023)
- July 11
  - Tomasz Stańko, Polish trumpeter, composer and improviser (d. 2018)
  - Jean Jourden, French cyclist
  - Vitorino, Portuguese singer-songwriter
- July 13
  - Harrison Ford, American actor
  - Roger McGuinn, American musician (The Byrds)
- July 14 – Javier Solana, Spanish politician and diplomat
- July 16 – Margaret Court, Australian tennis player
- July 17
  - Connie Hawkins, American basketball player (d. 2017)
  - Zoot Money, English vocalist, keyboardist and bandleader
- July 18
  - Prince Alexandre of Belgium (d. 2009)
  - Giacinto Facchetti, Italian footballer (d. 2006)
  - Adolf Ogi, member of the Swiss Federal Council
- July 19 – Frederick Kantor, American physicist
- July 20 – Salvatore Lo Piccolo, Italian mafioso
- July 21
  - Alfred Gomolka, German politician
  - Véronique Vendell, French actress
- July 22 – Toyohiro Akiyama, Japanese TV journalist and astronaut
- July 23 – Myra Hindley, English multiple murderer (d. 2002)
- July 24 – Chris Sarandon, American actor
- July 26 – Hannelore Elsner, German actress (d. 2019)
- July 27 – Dennis Ralston, American tennis player (d. 2020)
- July 29 – Tony Sirico, American actor (d. 2022)

=== August ===
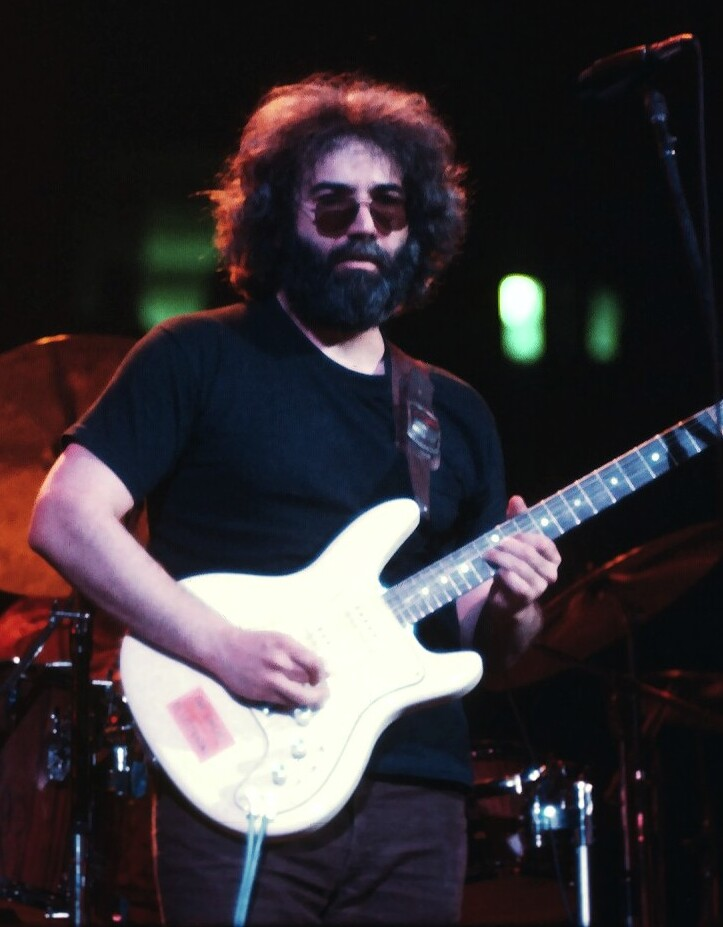
Jerry Garcia

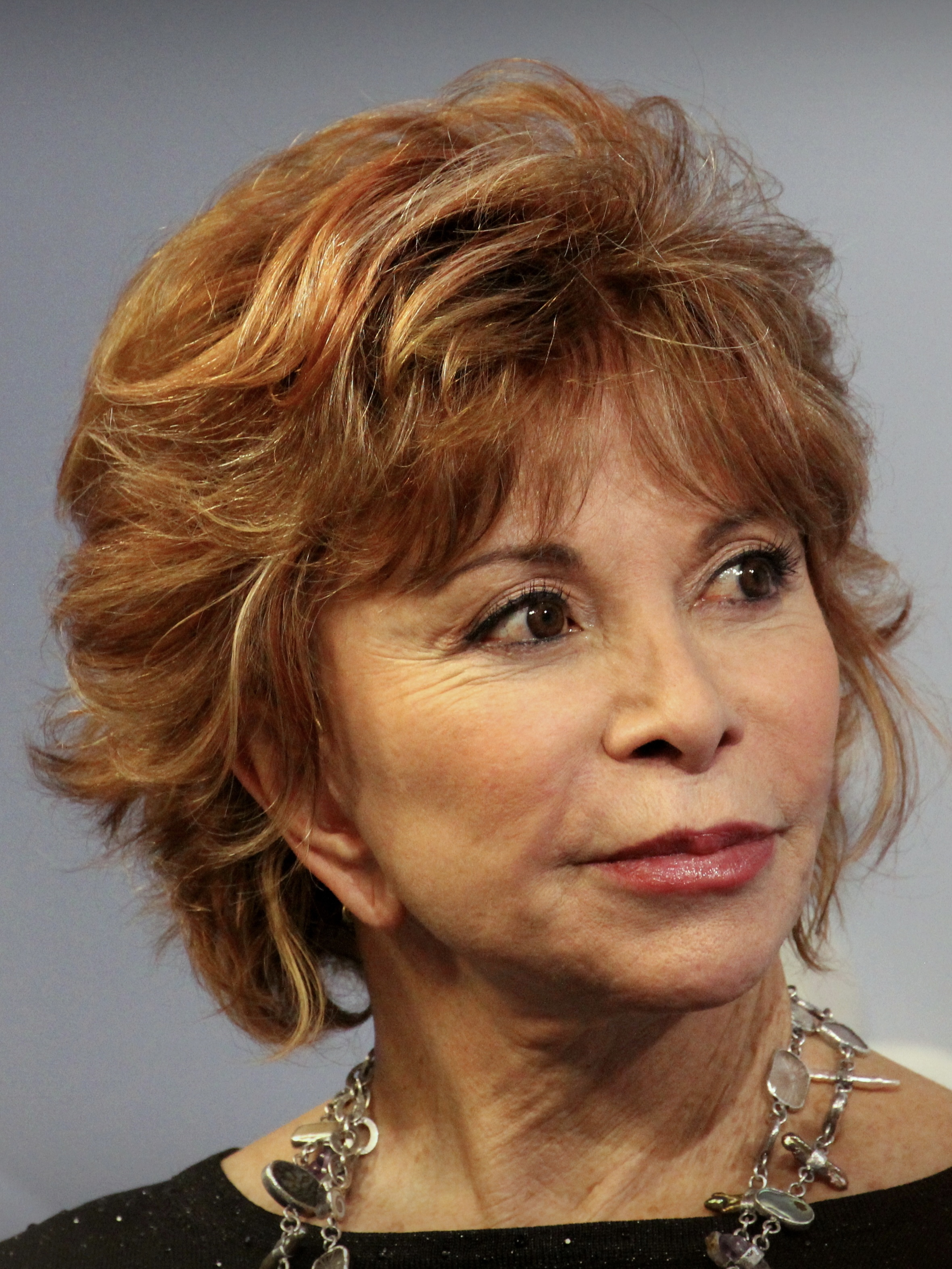
Isabel Allende

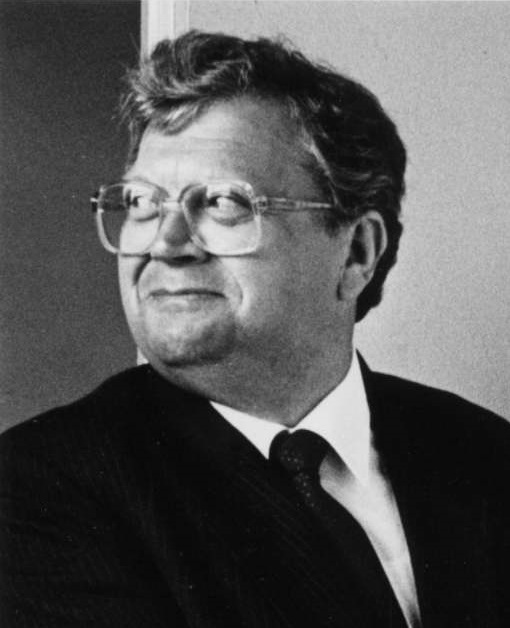
David Lange

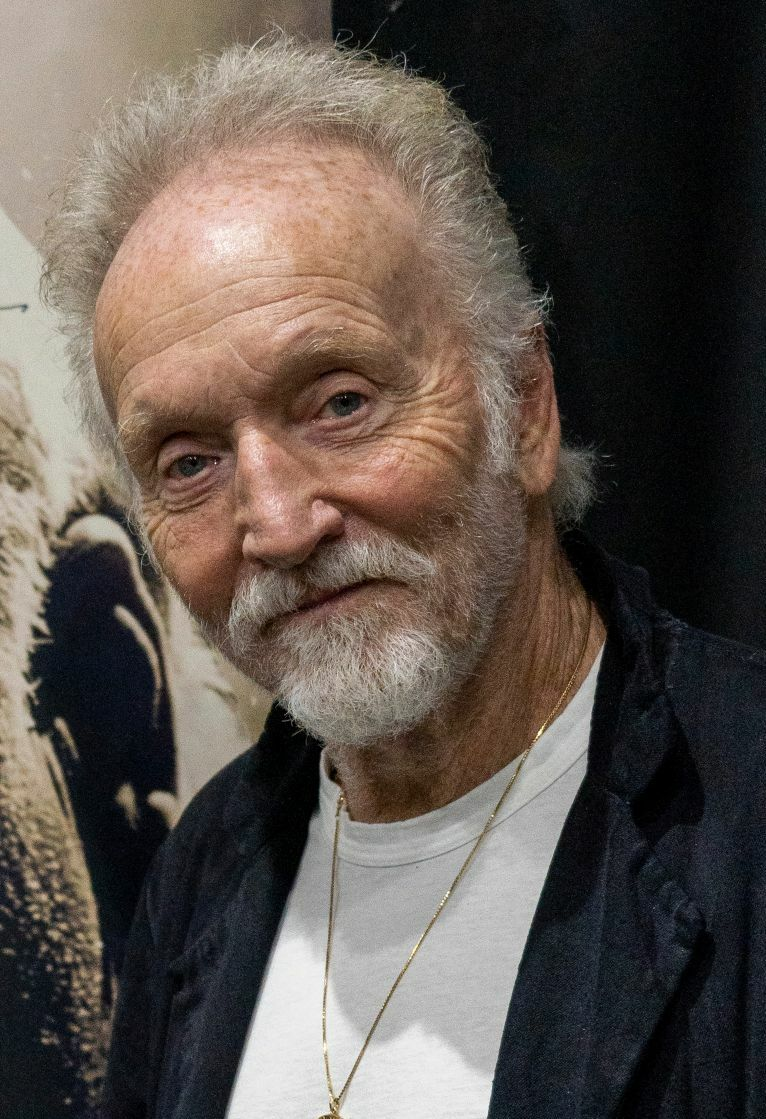
Tobin Bell

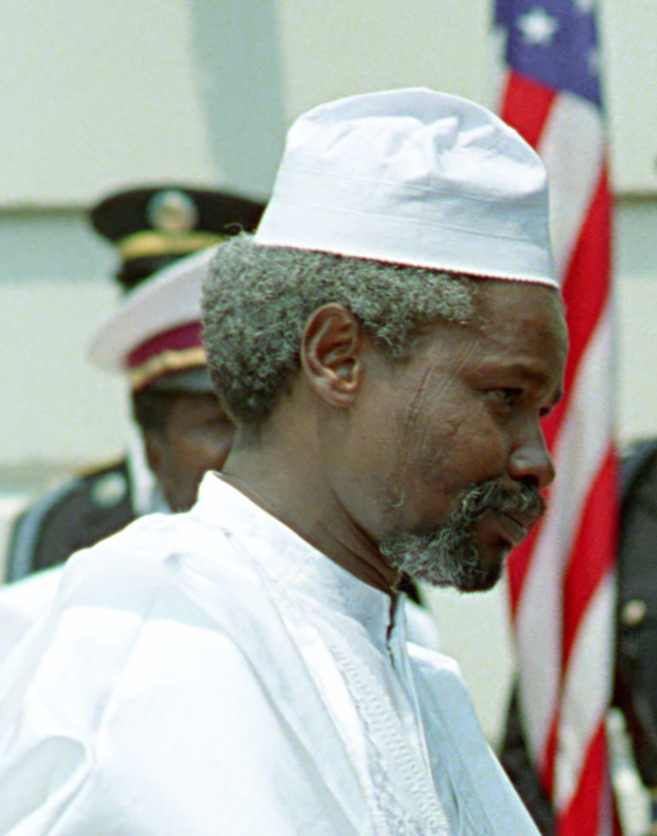
Hissène Habré

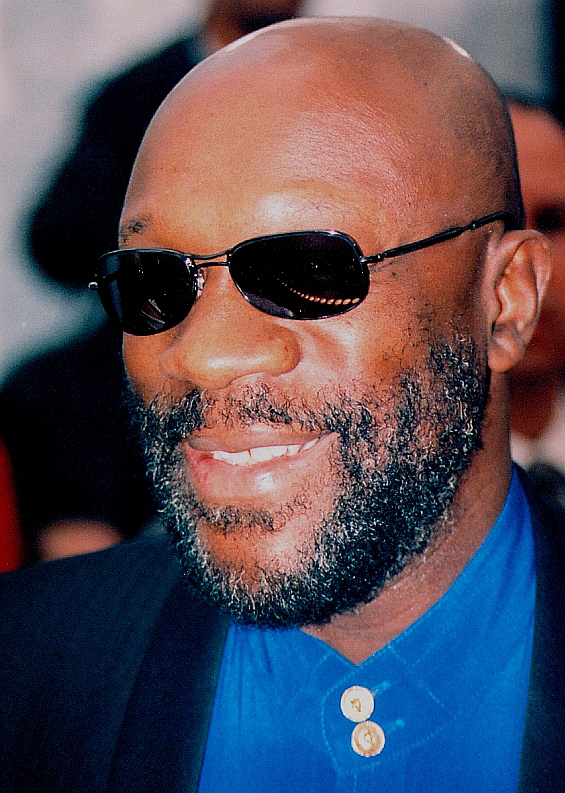
Isaac Hayes

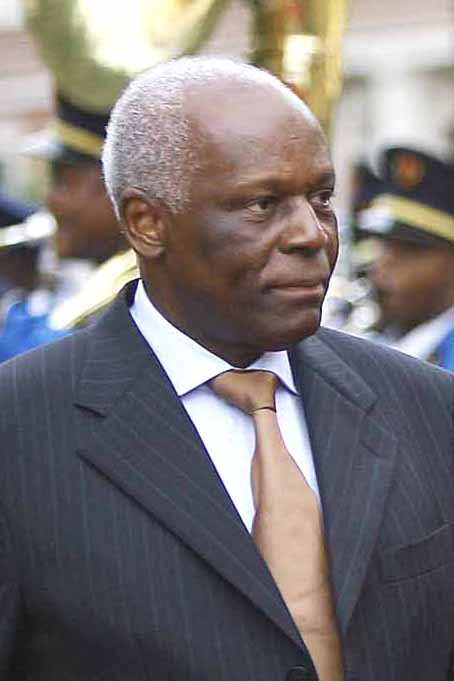
José Eduardo dos Santos

- August 1
  - Jerry Garcia, American musician (d. 1995)
  - Giancarlo Giannini, Italian actor
- August 2 – Isabel Allende, Chilean writer
- August 4 – David Lange, 32nd Prime Minister of New Zealand (d. 2005)
- August 6 – Evelyn Hamann, German actress (d. 2007)
- August 7
  - Tobin Bell, American actor
  - Garrison Keillor, American writer and radio host
  - Carlos Monzón, Argentine professional boxer (d. 1995)
  - Caetano Veloso, Brazilian composer, singer, guitarist, writer, and political activist
- August 9
  - Jack DeJohnette, American jazz drummer, pianist, and composer (d. 2025)
  - Miguel Littín, Chilean film director, screenwriter, film producer and novelist
- August 10 – Agepê, Brazilian singer/composer (d. 1995)
- August 13
  - Hissène Habré, 1st Prime Minister and 5th President of Chad (d. 2021)
  - Robert L. Stewart, American astronaut
- August 17 – Muslim Magomayev, Soviet, Azerbaijani and Russian singer (d. 2008)
- August 20 – Isaac Hayes, American singer and actor (d. 2008)
- August 23
  - Nancy Richey, American tennis player
  - Susana Vieira, Brazilian actress
- August 24
  - Hans Peter Korff, German actor (d. 2025)
  - Karen Uhlenbeck, American mathematician
- August 25
  - Imogen Hassall, English actress (d. 1980)
  - Howard Jacobson, British novelist and journalist
- August 26 – John E. Blaha, American astronaut
- August 27
  - Daryl Dragon, American musician (d. 2019)
  - Tom Belsø, Danish motor racing driver (d. 2020)
- August 28 – José Eduardo dos Santos, 2nd President of Angola (d. 2022)
- August 29 – Sterling Morrison, American musician (d. 1995)
- August 30 – John Kani, South African actor, director and playwright

=== September ===
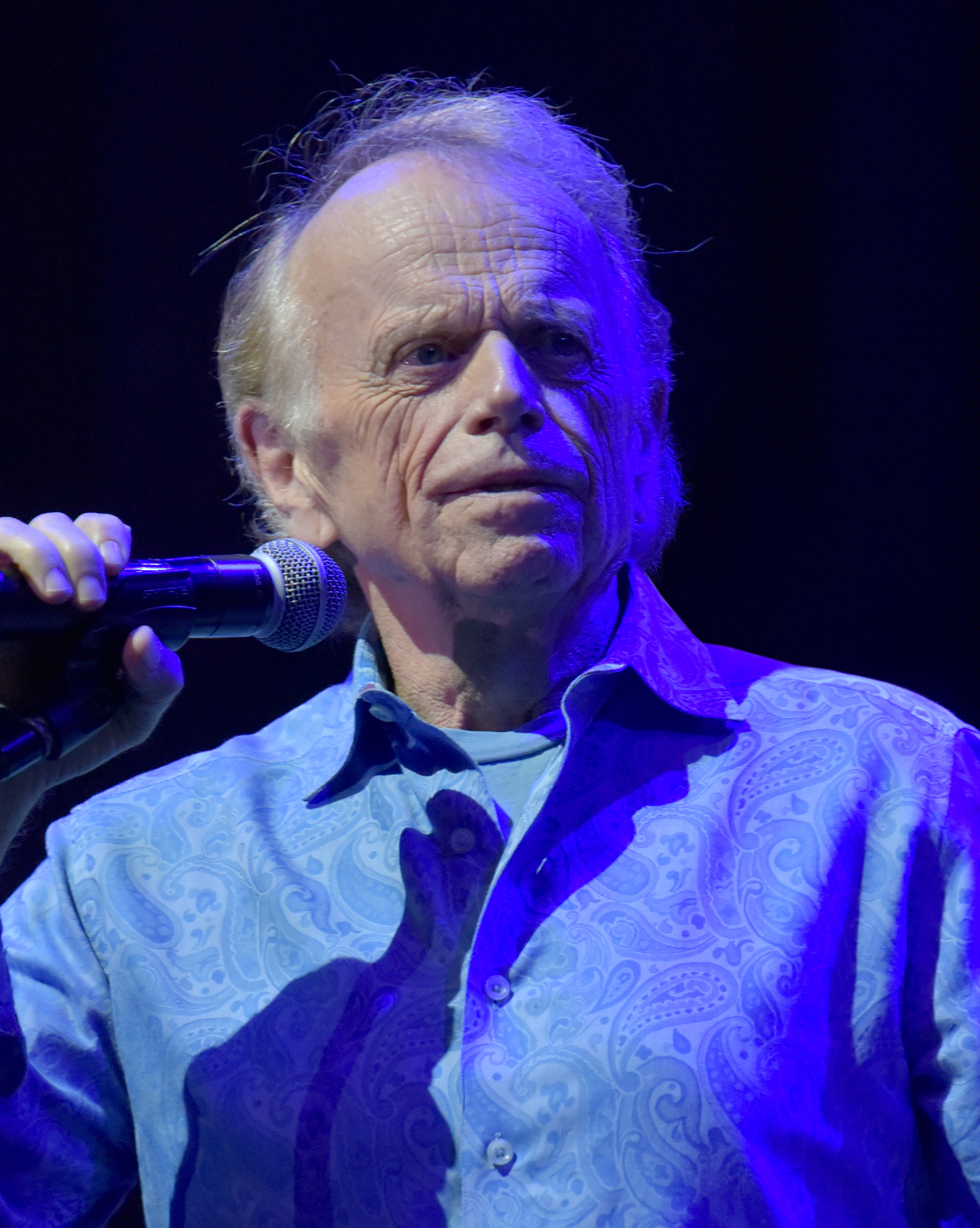
Al Jardine

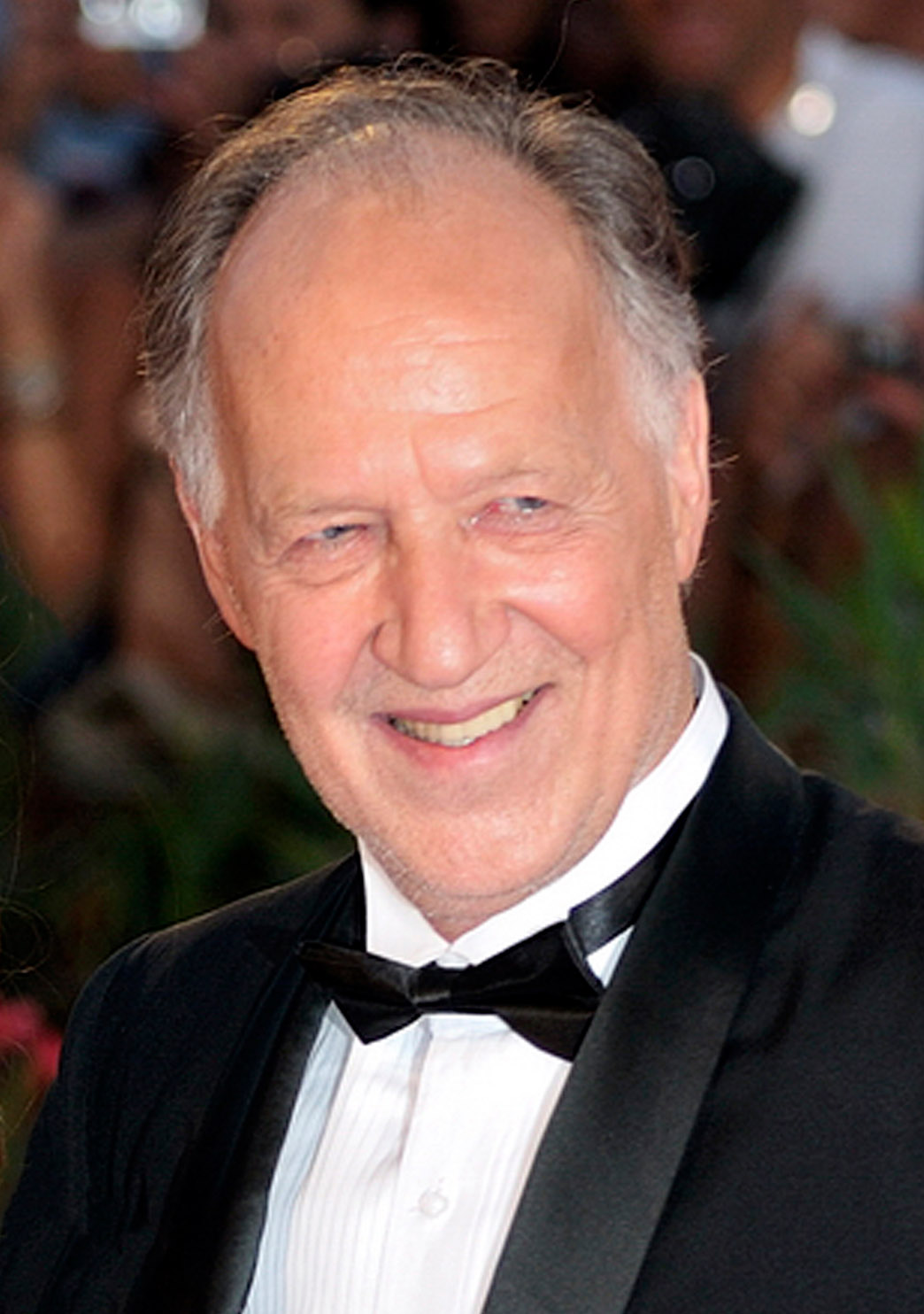
Werner Herzog

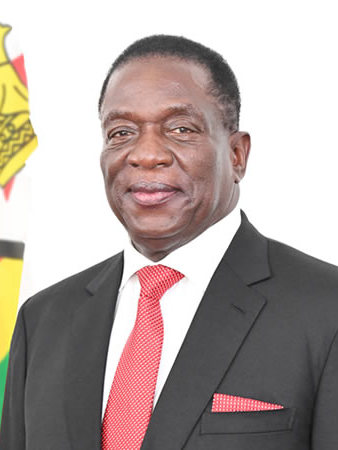
Emmerson Mnangagwa

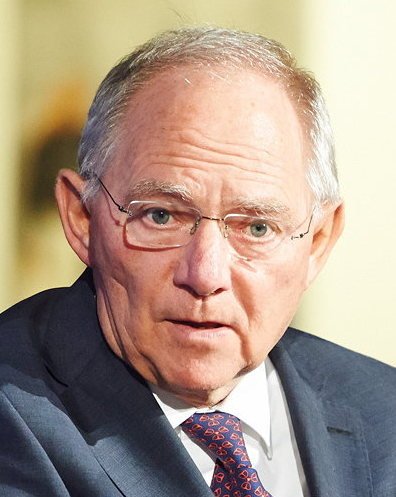
Wolfgang Schäuble

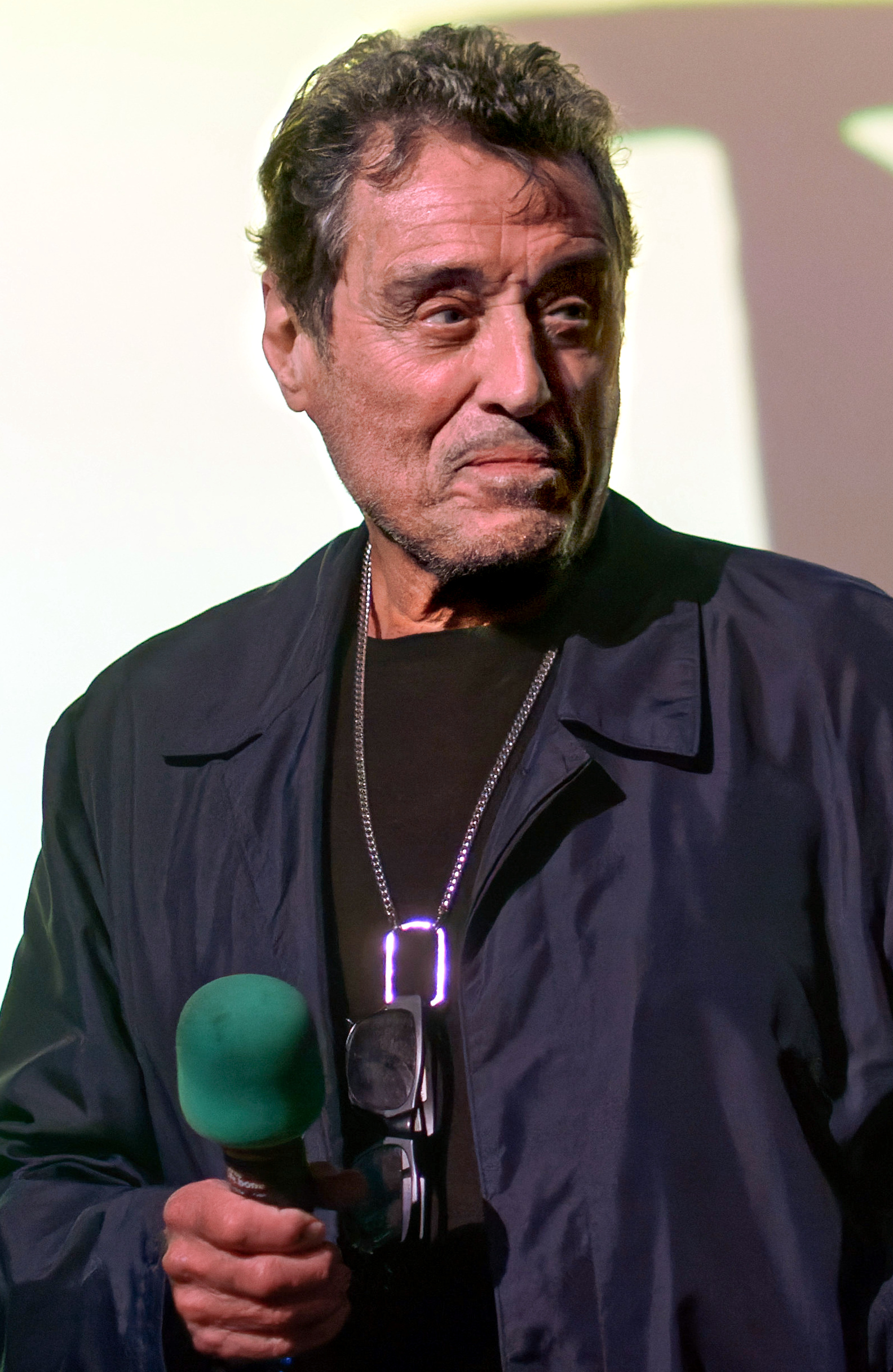
Ian McShane

- September 1 – C. J. Cherryh, American writer
- September 2
  - Robert Shapiro, American lawyer and entrepreneur
  - Merrill Reese, American sports broadcaster
- September 3
  - Michael Hui, Hong Kong film comedian
  - Al Jardine, American musician
- September 4 – Raymond Floyd, American golfer
- September 5
  - Denise Fabre, French television personality
  - Werner Herzog, German filmmaker
  - Eduardo Mata, Mexican conductor and composer (d. 1995)
- September 6
  - Mel McDaniel, American country singer (d. 2011)
  - Carol Wayne, American television and film actress (d. 1985)
- September 7 – Alan Oakes, English footballer
- September 8 – Želimir Žilnik, Serbian film director
- September 9 – The Iron Sheik, Iranian-American wrestler (d. 2023)
- September 11 – Lola Falana, American singer, dancer, model and actress
- September 14 – Arturo Macapagal, Filipino shooter (d. 2015)
- September 15
  - Wen Jiabao, Premier of China
  - Emmerson Mnangagwa, 3rd President of Zimbabwe
- September 17 – Lupe Ontiveros, American actress (d. 2012)
  - Robert Graysmith, American true crime author and former cartoonist
- September 18 – Wolfgang Schäuble, German politician (d. 2023)
- September 19 – Freda Payne, American singer and actress
- September 20 – Rose Francine Rogombé, Gabonese lawyer and politician (d. 2015)
- September 21 – Mahinda Wijesekara, Sri Lankan politician, cabinet minister and MP (d. 2026)
- September 22
  - Wu Ma, Chinese film actor, director, producer and writer (d. 2014)
  - Marlena Shaw, American jazz singer (d. 2024)
  - David Stern, American commissioner of the National Basketball Association (d. 2020)
- September 25 – Dee Dee Warwick, American singer (d. 2008)
- September 26
  - Ingrid Becker, German athlete
  - Heidemarie Cammerlander, Austrian politician
- September 28
  - Marshall Bell, American actor
  - Pierre Clémenti, French actor (d. 1999)
  - Tim Maia, Brazilian musician, songwriter and businessman (d. 1998)
  - Justinian Rweyemamu, Tanzania's first major economics scholar (d. 1982)
- September 29
  - Yves Rénier, French actor and filmmaker (d. 2021)
  - Felice Gimondi, Italian racing cyclist (d. 2019)
  - Madeline Kahn, American actress (d. 1999)
  - Ian McShane, English actor
  - Bill Nelson, American politician and astronaut
  - Jean-Luc Ponty, French jazz violinist
- September 30
  - Gus Dudgeon, English record producer (d. 2002)
  - Frankie Lymon, American singer (d. 1968)
  - Sture Pettersson, Swedish cyclist (d. 1983)

=== October ===
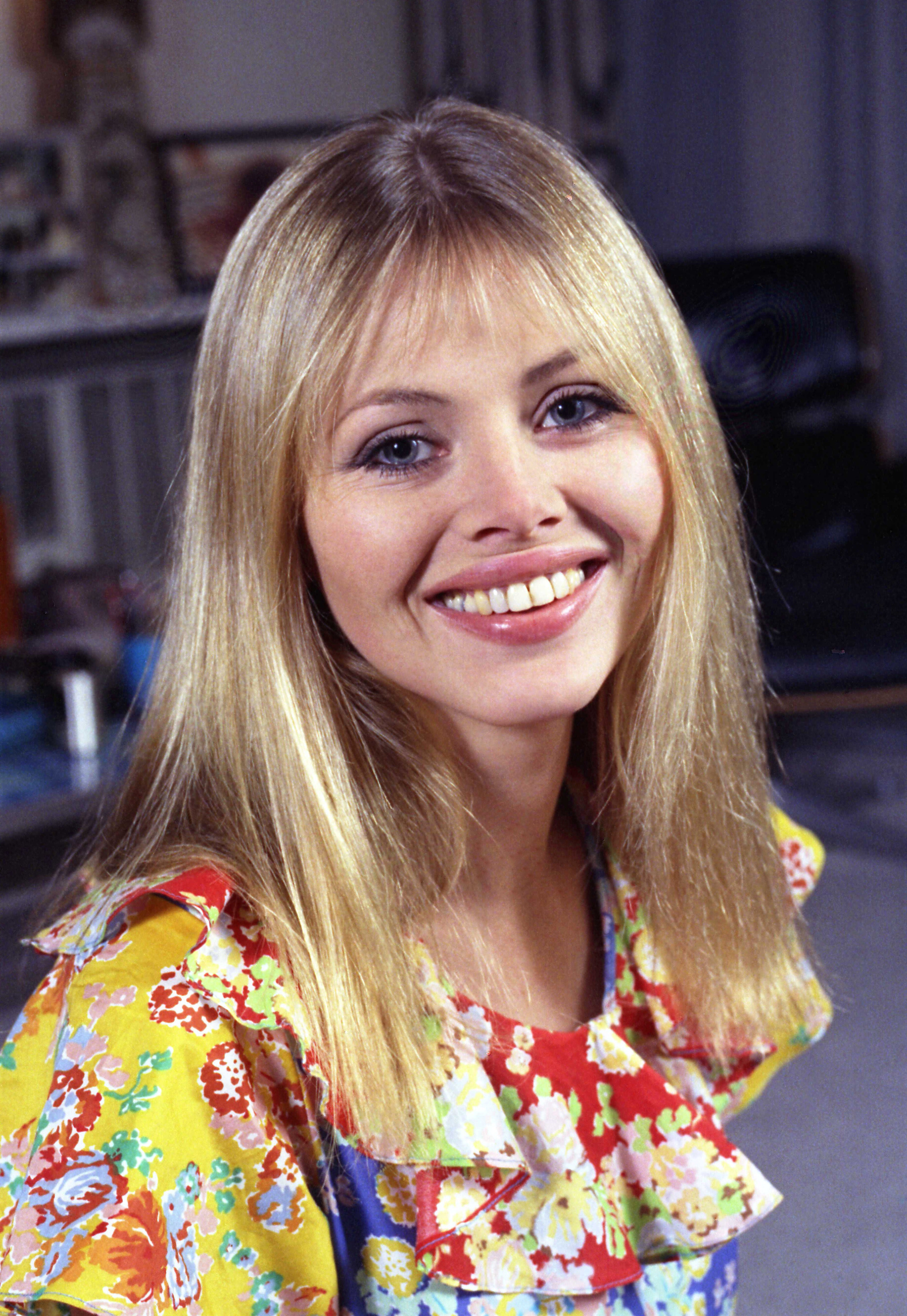
Britt Ekland

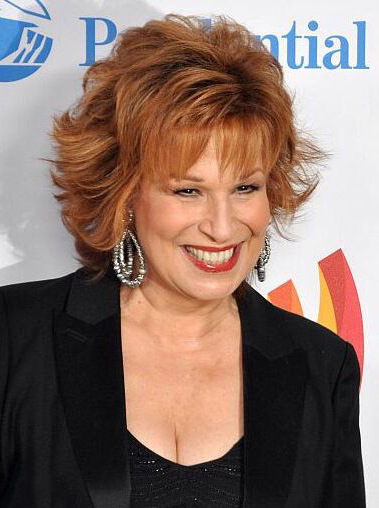
Joy Behar

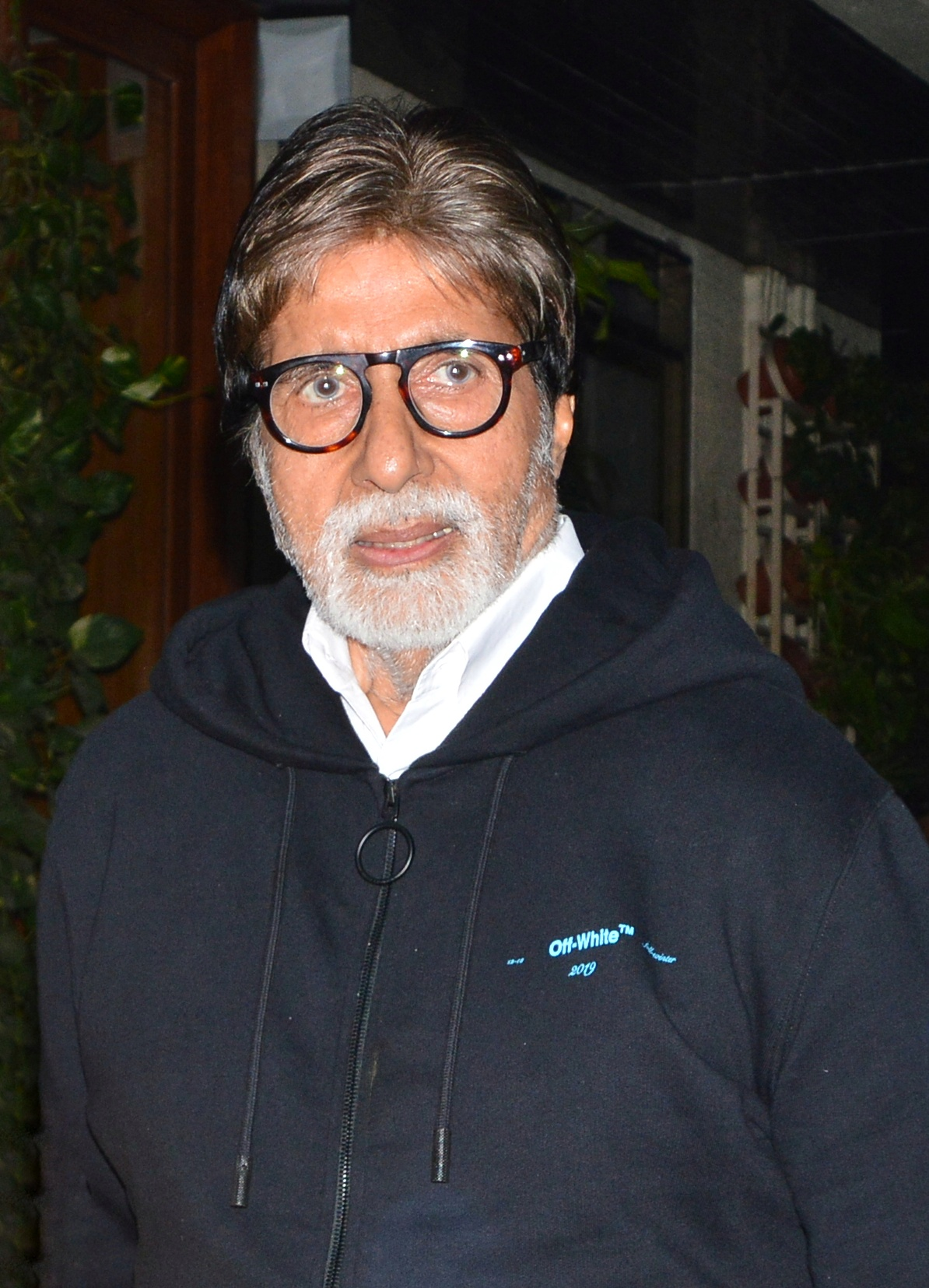
Amitabh Bachchan

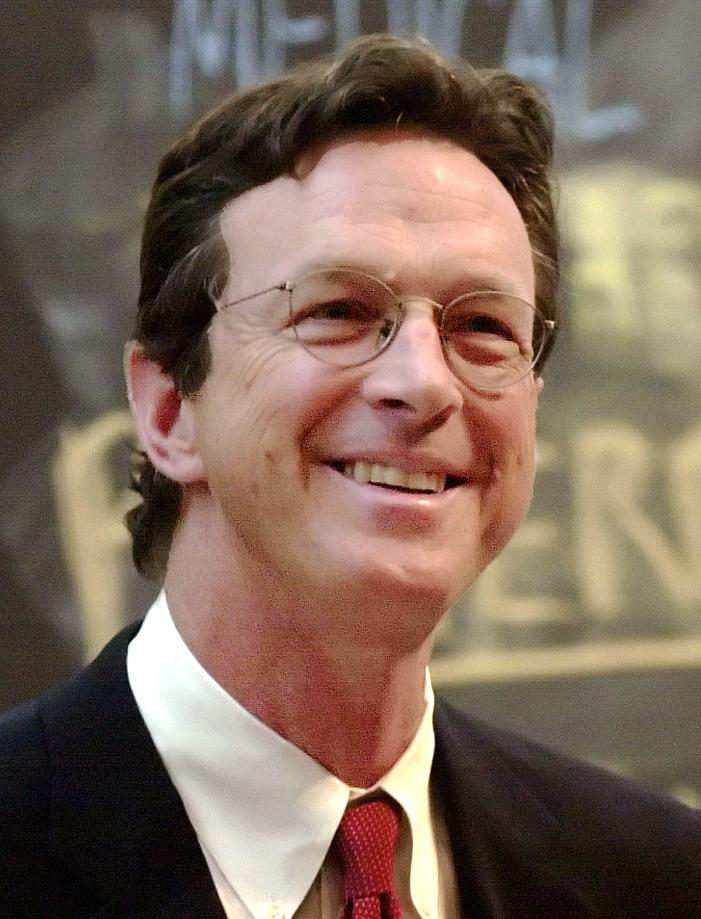
Michael Crichton

- October 1 – Günter Wallraff, German investigative journalist
  - Jean-Pierre Jabouille, French F1 driver (d. 2023)
- October 2 – Asha Parekh, Indian actress, film director and producer
- October 3
  - Earl Hindman, American actor (d. 2003)
  - Roberto Perfumo, Argentine footballer and sports commentator (d. 2016)
- October 6 – Britt Ekland, Swedish actress
- October 7
  - Ronald Baecker, American computer scientist
  - Joy Behar, American comedian and television personality
- October 8
  - Stanley Bates, British actor and screenwriter
  - Nguyễn Minh Triết, 6th President of Vietnam
- October 9 – Shukri Ghanem, Libyan politician (d. 2012)
- October 10
  - Janis Hansen, American singer and author (d. 2017)
  - Radu Vasile, Prime Minister of Romania (d. 2013)
- October 11 – Amitabh Bachchan, Indian actor, film producer, and television host
- October 12 – Daliah Lavi, Israeli actress and singer (d. 2017)
- October 13
  - Rutanya Alda, Latvian-American actress
  - Jerry Jones, American football team owner
- October 19
  - Bronwyn Bishop, Australian politician
  - Andrew Vachss, American author and attorney (d. 2021)
- October 20
  - Christel DeHaan, German-American businesswoman and philanthropist (d. 2020)
  - Arto Paasilinna, Finnish writer (d. 2018)
  - Christiane Nüsslein-Volhard, German biologist, recipient of the Nobel Prize in Physiology or Medicine
- October 21 – Judy Sheindlin, American retired judge turned television personality (Judge Judy)
- October 22
  - Bobby Fuller, American rock singer, songwriter, and guitarist (d. 1966)
  - Annette Funicello, American actress and singer (d. 2013)
  - Pedro Morales, Puerto Rican professional wrestler (d. 2019)
- October 23
  - Michael Crichton, American author (d. 2008)
  - Anita Roddick, British businesswoman, human rights activist and campaigner (d. 2007)
- October 24 – Frank Delaney, Irish-born novelist, journalist and broadcaster (d. 2017)
- October 25 – Gloria Katz, American screenwriter and film producer (d. 2018)
- October 26 – Bob Hoskins, British actor (d. 2014)
- October 27 – Lee Greenwood, American country singer and songwriter
- October 28 – Kees Verkerk, Dutch speed skater
- October 29 – Bob Ross, American painter and television presenter (d. 1995)
- October 31
  - George Brizan, 8th Prime Minister of Grenada (d. 2012)
  - David Ogden Stiers, American actor and voice-over artist (d. 2018)

=== November ===
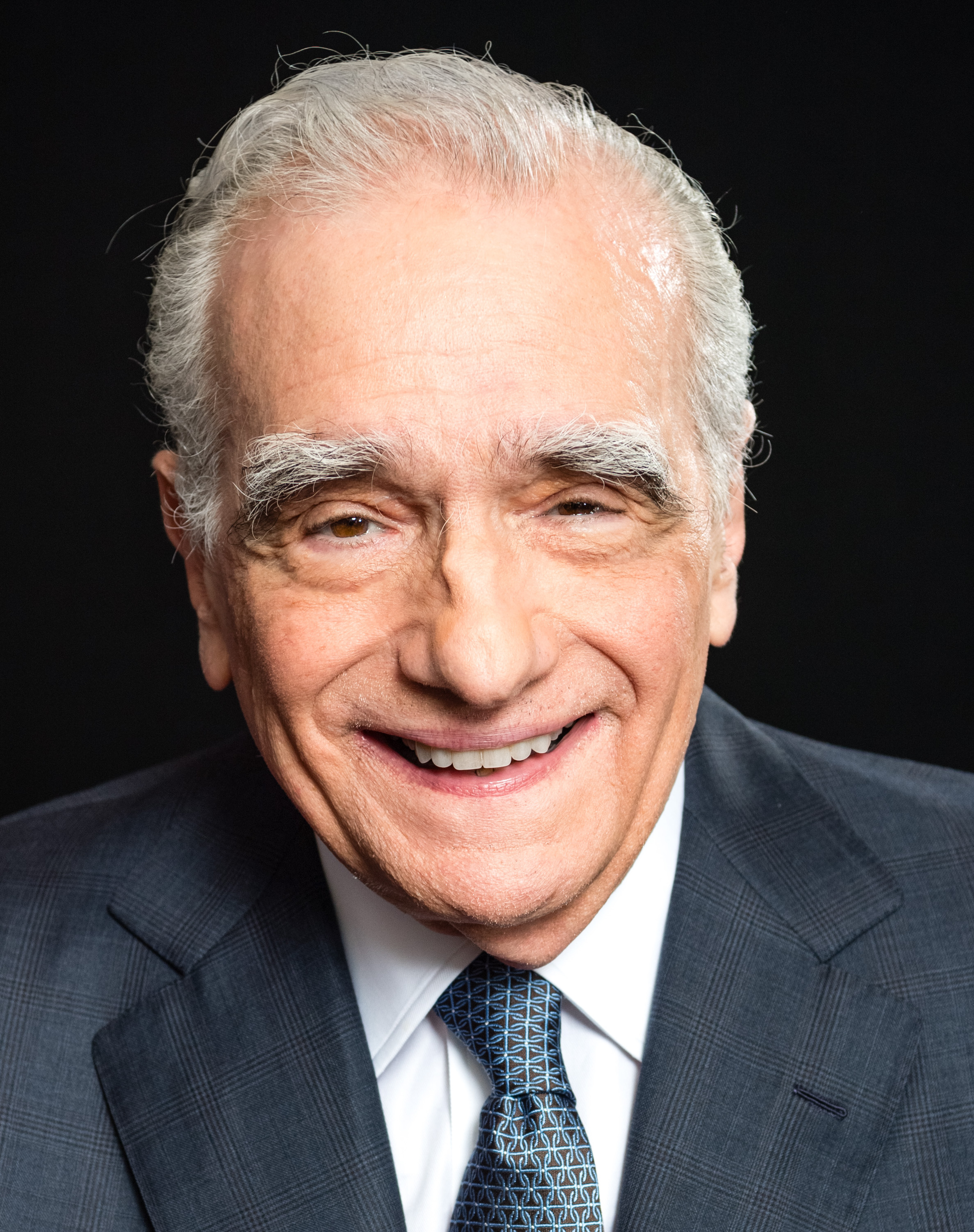
Martin Scorsese

Joe Biden

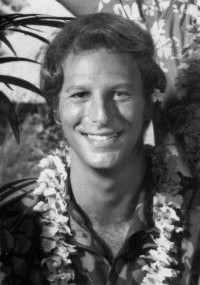
Bob Einstein

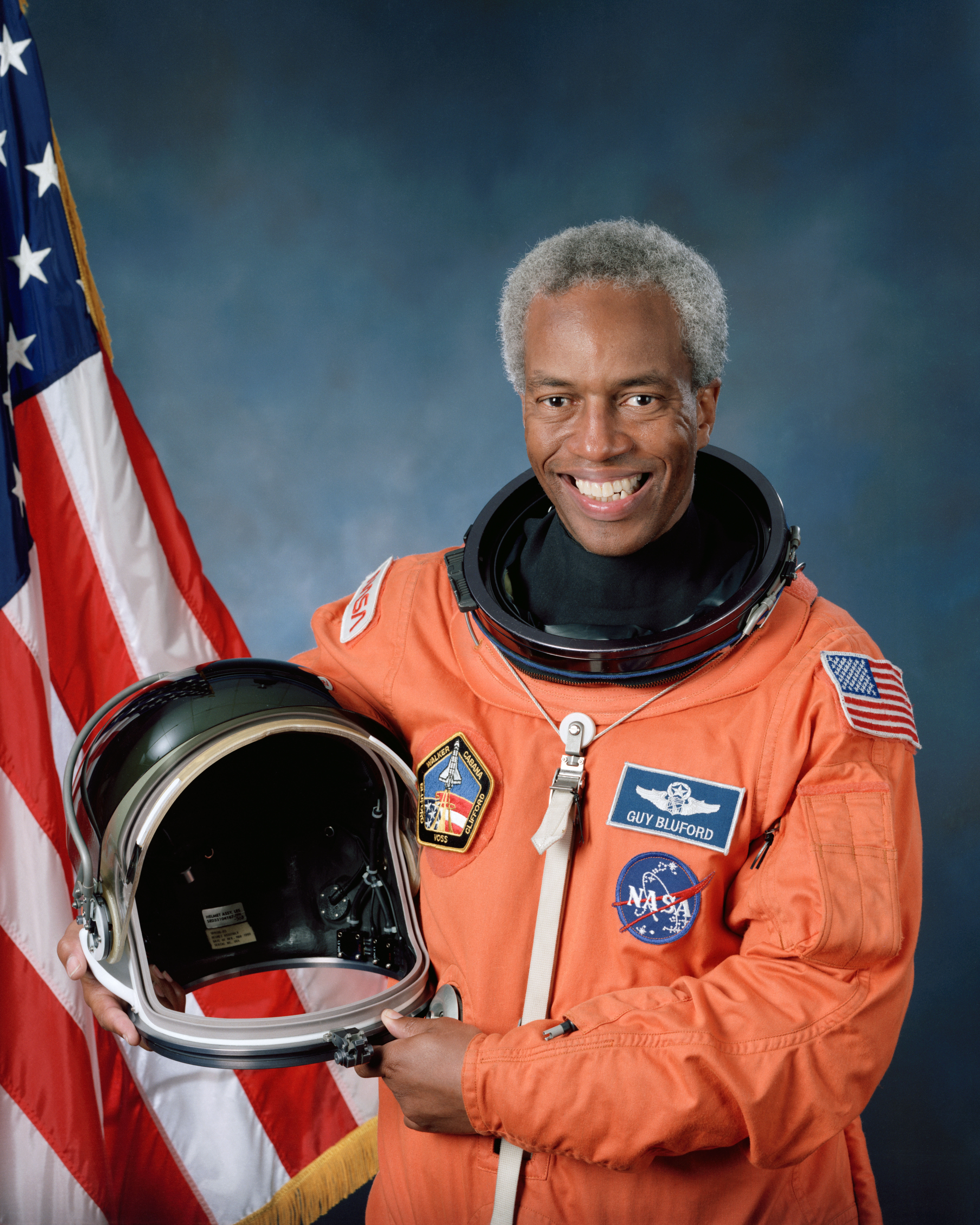
Guion Bluford

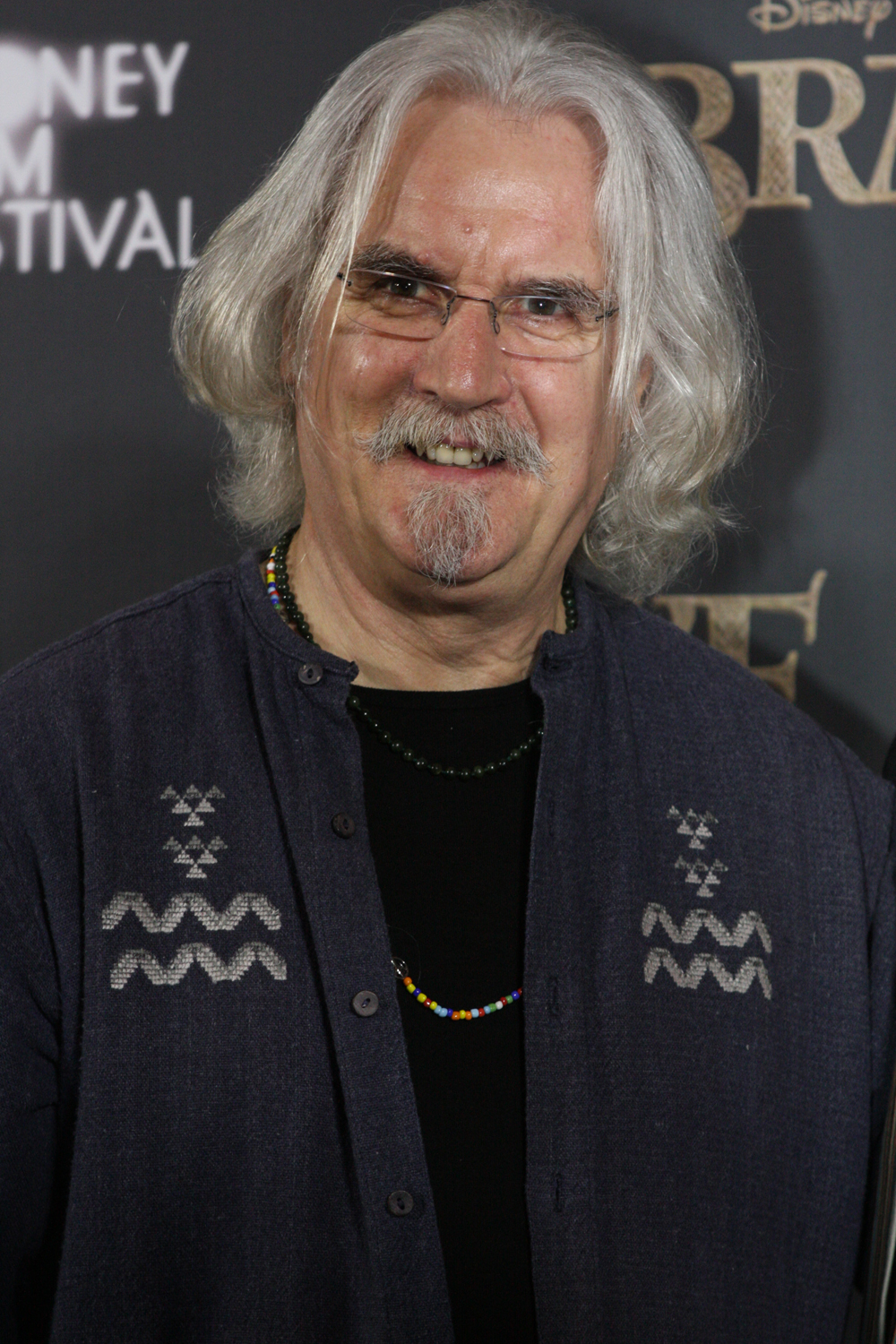
Sir Billy Connolly

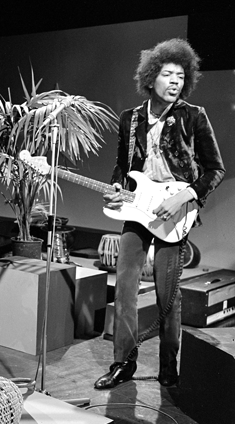
Jimi Hendrix

- November 1
  - Larry Flynt, American publisher (Hustler) (d. 2021)
  - Ralph Klein, Canadian politician (d. 2013)
  - Marcia Wallace, American actress and comedian (d. 2013)
- November 2
  - Shere Hite, American-born German sexologist (d. 2020)
  - Stefanie Powers, American actress
- November 6 – Jean Shrimpton, English model and actress
- November 7
  - Tom Peters, American writer
  - Johnny Rivers, American musician, singer and songwriter
- November 8
  - Angel Cordero Jr., Puerto Rican jockey
  - Sandro Mazzola, Italian footballer (d. 2026)
  - Fernando Sorrentino, Argentine writer
- November 10
  - Robert F. Engle, American economist, Nobel Prize laureate
  - Hans-Rudolf Merz, Swiss federal councillor
- November 11 – K. Connie Kang, Korean American journalist and author (d. 2019)
- November 15 – Daniel Barenboim, Argentine-born pianist and conductor
- November 16 – Joanna Pettet, British-born Canadian actress
- November 17
  - Derek Clayton, Australian long-distance runner
  - Bob Gaudio, American musician
  - Kang Kek Iew, Cambodian politician and criminal (d. 2020)
  - István Rosztóczy, Hungarian microbiologist (d. 1993)
  - Martin Scorsese, American film director
- November 18
  - Linda Evans, American actress
  - Susan Sullivan, American actress
- November 19 – Calvin Klein, American fashion designer
- November 20
  - Joe Biden, 46th President of the United States
  - Bob Einstein, American actor, producer and screenwriter (d. 2019)
  - Norman Greenbaum, American singer-songwriter
- November 21 – Al Matthews, African-American actor and singer (d. 2018)
- November 22
  - Francis K. Butagira, Ugandan ambassador
  - Dick Stockton, American sports announcer
  - Guion Bluford, African-American astronaut
- November 23 – Susan Anspach, American actress (d. 2018)
- November 24 – Billy Connolly, Scottish comedian and singer
- November 25 – Rosa von Praunheim, German film director, author and gay rights activist (d. 2025)
- November 26 – Olivia Cole, African-American actress (d. 2018)
- November 27
  - Manolo Blahnik, Spanish shoe designer
  - Jimi Hendrix, American guitarist (d. 1970)
- November 28 – Eric Shinseki, American U.S. Army General
- November 29
  - Michael Craze, British actor (d. 1998)
  - Philippe Huttenlocher, Swiss baritone
- November 30 – André Brahic, French astrophysicist (d. 2016)

=== December ===
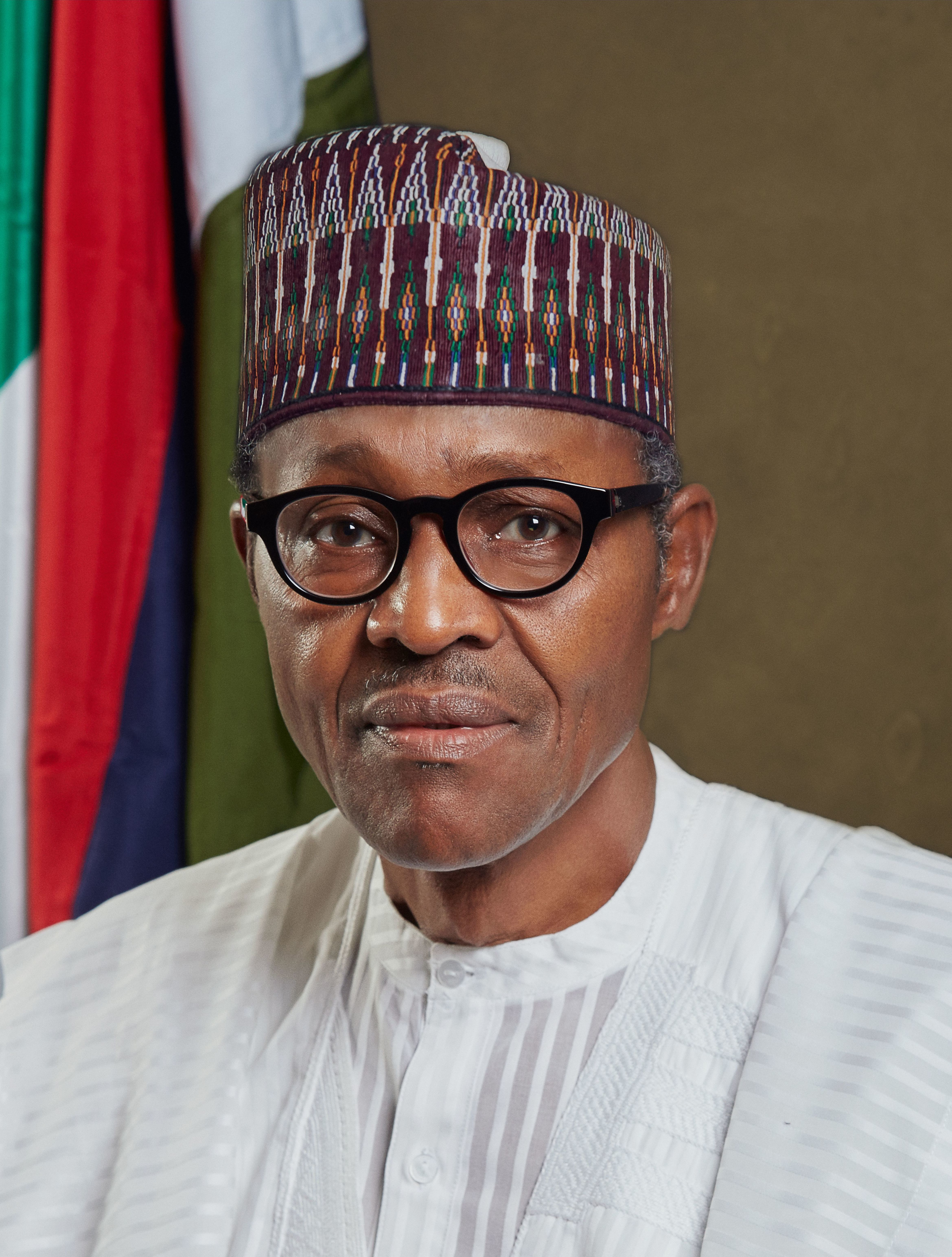
Muhammadu Buhari

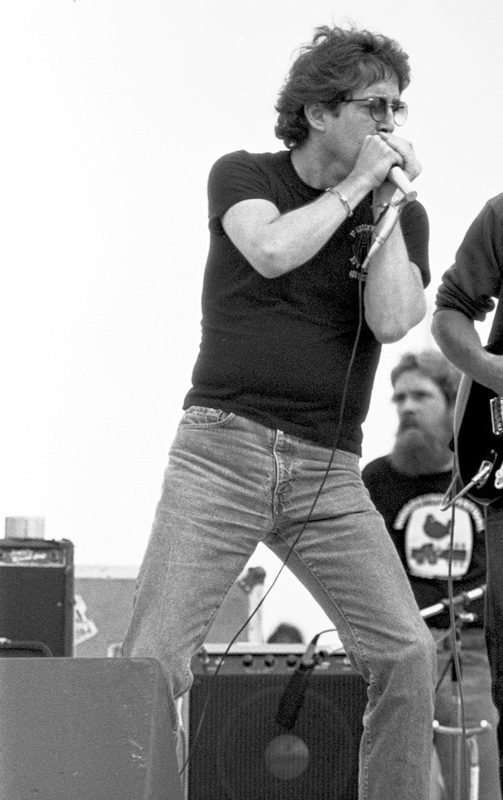
Paul Butterfield

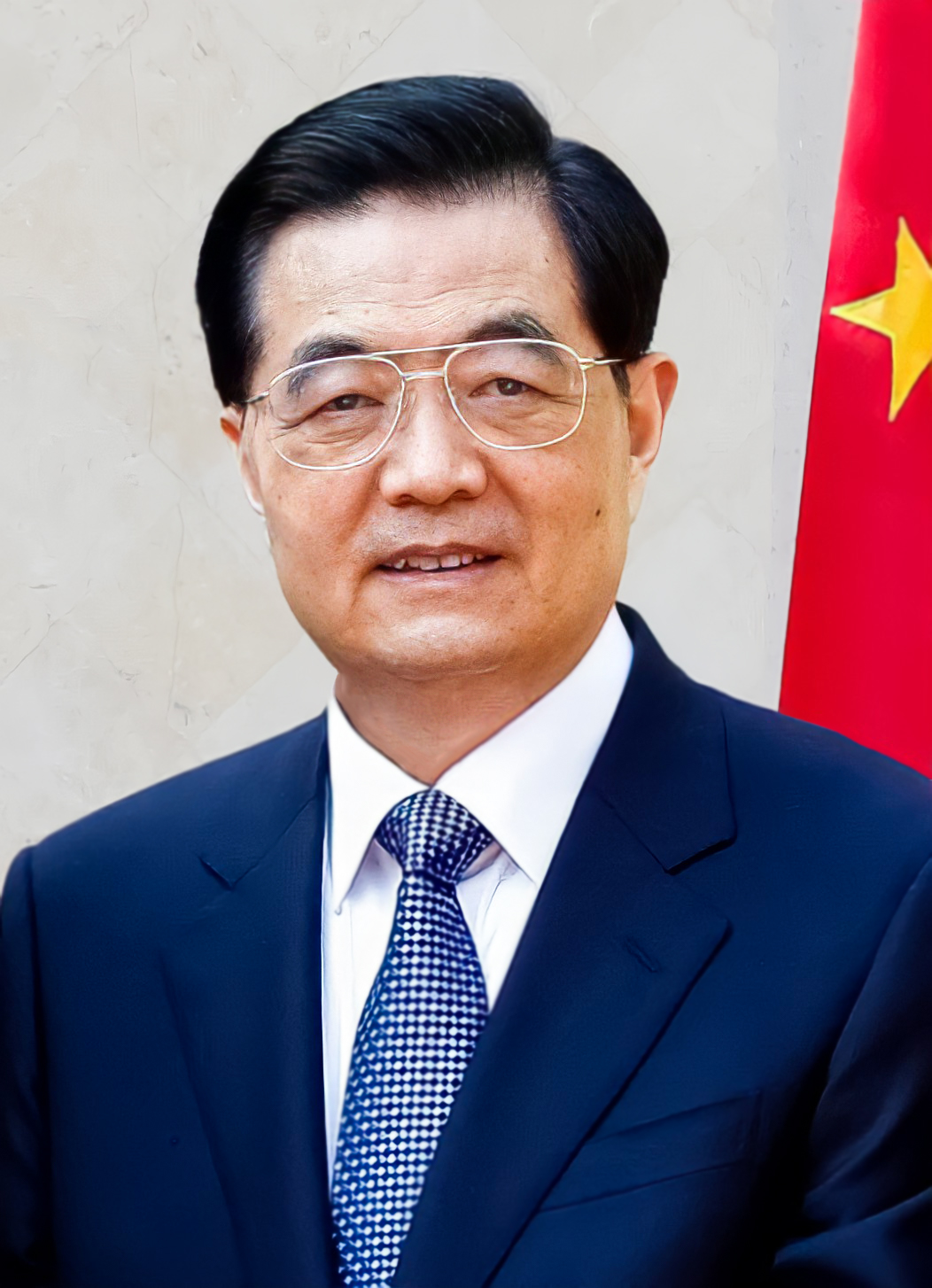
Hu Jintao

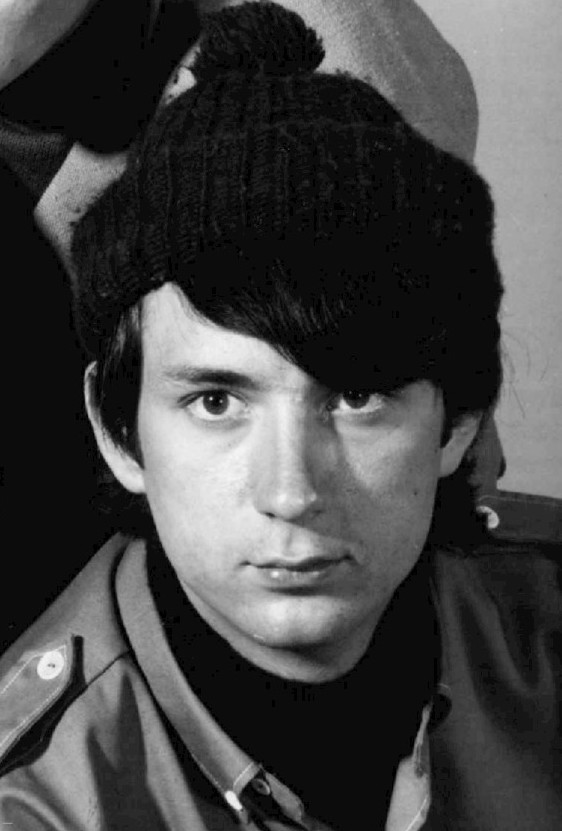
Michael Nesmith

- December 1 – John Clauser, American quantum physicist, recipient of the Nobel Prize in Physics
- December 2 – Francisque Ravony, 7th Prime Minister of Madagascar (d. 2003)
- December 3 – Alice Schwarzer, German feminist, founder and publisher of German feminist journal EMMA
- December 4
  - William "Red" Dawson, American football player and coach
  - Al Hunt, American columnist
  - Gemma Jones, British actress
- December 6
  - Chelsea Brown, American actress (d. 2017)
  - Peter Handke, Austrian novelist
- December 7
  - Harry Chapin, American singer-songwriter (d. 1981)
  - Reginald Lewis, American businessman (d. 1993)
  - Peter Tomarken, American game-show host (d. 2006)
- December 8 – Toots Hibbert, Jamaican reggae singer-songwriter (d. 2020)
- December 9
  - Dick Butkus, American football player (d. 2023)
  - Billy Bremner, Scottish footballer (d. 1997)
- December 17
  - Muhammadu Buhari, Nigerian army general, 7th and 15th President of Nigeria (d. 2025)
  - Paul Butterfield, American musician (d. 1987)
- December 19
  - Milan Milutinovic, President of Serbia (d. 2023)
  - Gene Okerlund, American wrestling announcer (d. 2019)
- December 20 – Bob Hayes, African-American athlete (d. 2002)
- December 21
  - Hu Jintao, General Secretary of the Chinese Communist Party, 6th President of China
  - Carla Thomas, American singer
- December 22 – Dick Parry, English saxophonist
- December 24 – Hédi M'henni, Tunisian politician (d. 2024)
- December 27
  - Muruga Booker, American drummer, composer, inventor, artist and recording artist
  - Charmian Carr, American actress (d. 2016)
  - Thomas Menino, 53rd Mayor of Boston, Massachusetts (d. 2014)
- December 29 – Rajesh Khanna, Indian actor (d. 2012)
- December 30
  - Betty Aberlin, American actress
  - Vladimir Bukovsky, Russian-born British human rights activist and political dissident (d. 2019)
  - Anne Charleston, Australian actress
  - Allan Gotthelf, American philosopher (d. 2013)
  - Michael Nesmith, American musician, singer-songwriter, producer (d. 2021)
  - Janko Prunk, Slovenian historian
  - Fred Ward, American actor and producer (d. 2022)
- December 31 – Taufiq Kiemas, 5th First Spouse of Indonesia (d. 2013)

== Deaths ==
=== January ===
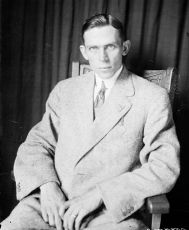
Mel Sheppard

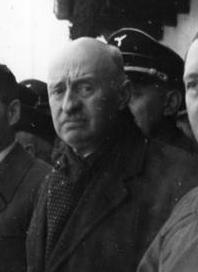
Henri de Baillet-Latour

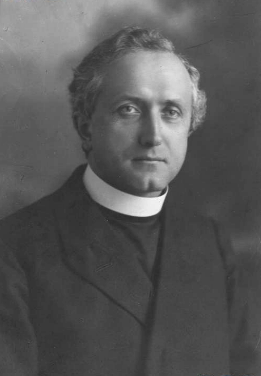
Emil Szramek

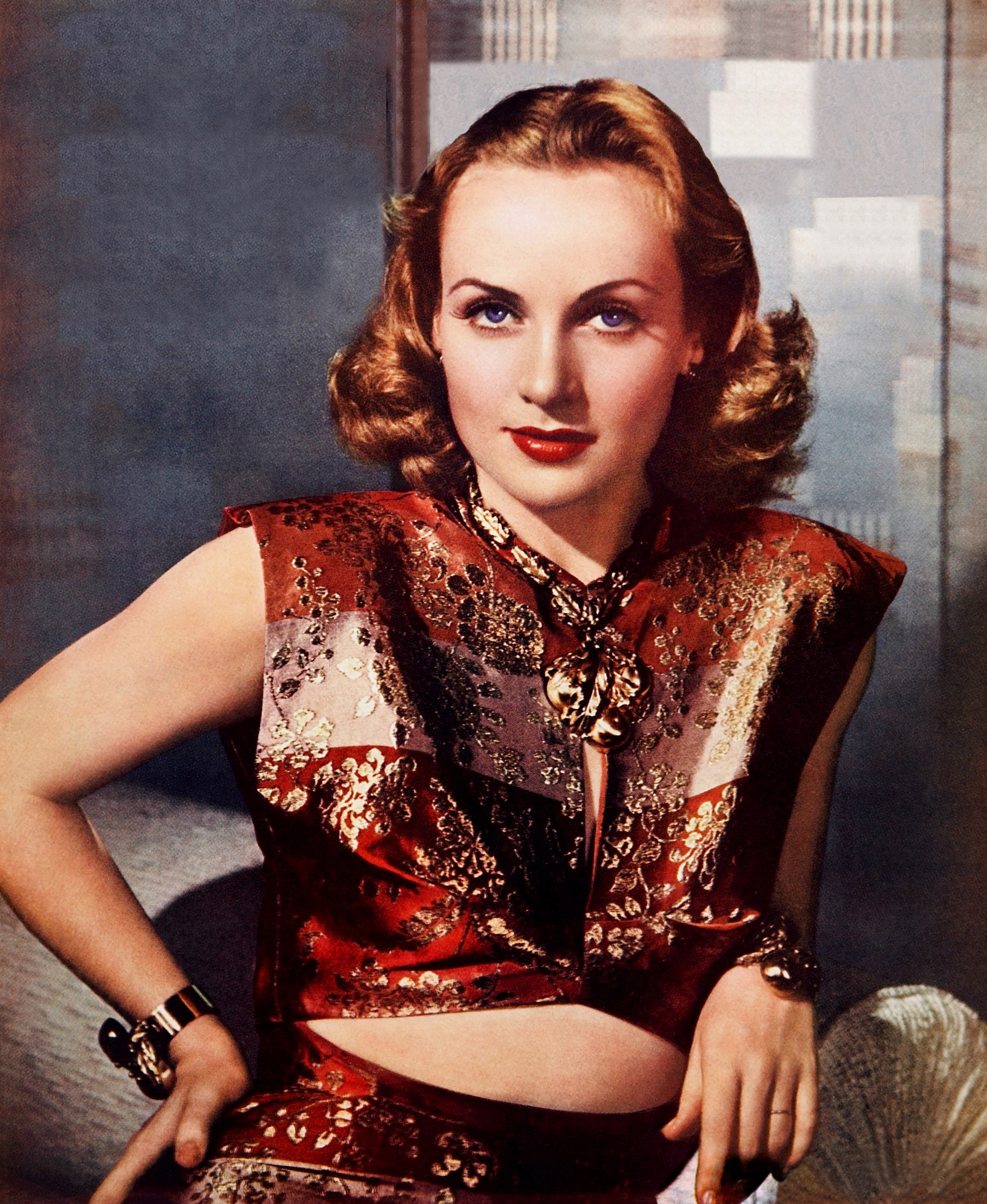
Carole Lombard

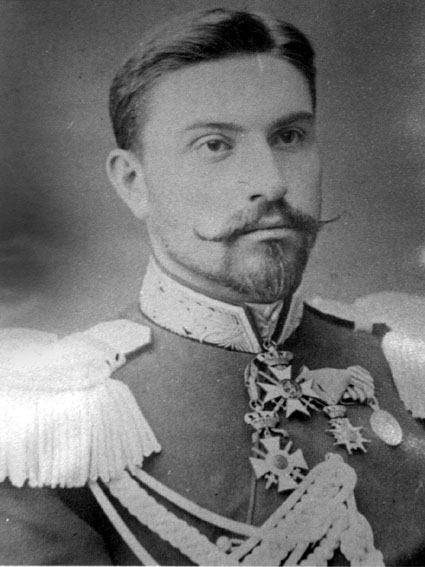
Racho Petrov

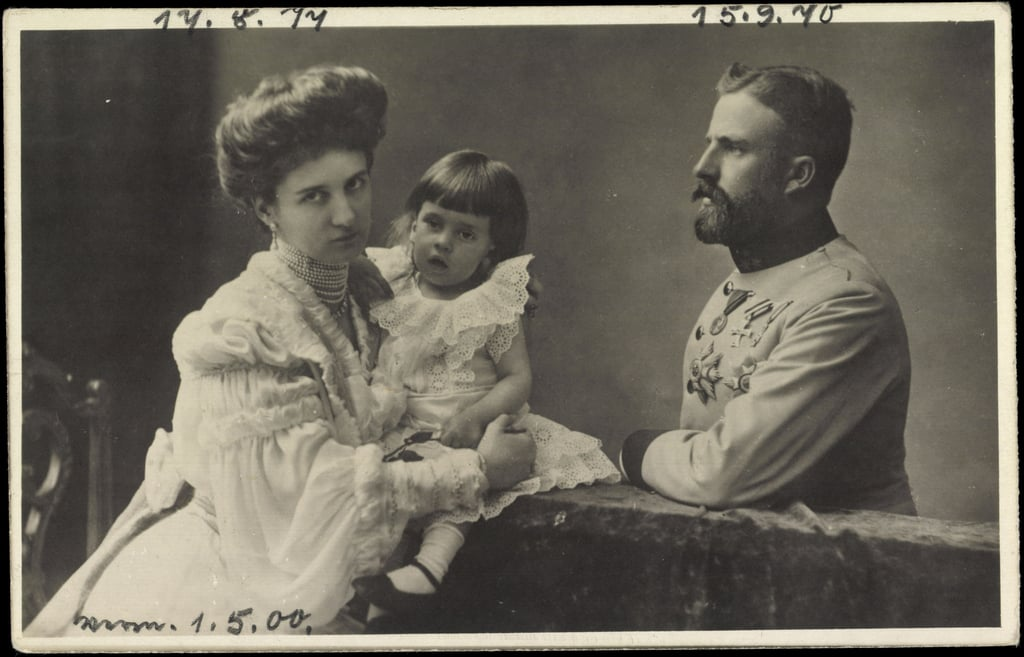
Prince Ludwig Gaston of Saxe-Coburg and Gotha

- January 2 – Ivande Kaija, Soviet writer and feminist (b. 1876)
- January 4
  - Sydney Fairbrother, British actress (b. 1872)
  - Mel Sheppard, American Olympic athlete (b. 1883)
  - Otis Skinner, American actor (b. 1858)
- January 6
  - Emma Calvé, French soprano (b. 1858)
  - Henri de Baillet-Latour, 3rd President of the International Olympic Committee (b. 1876)
- January 9
  - Heber Doust Curtis, American astronomer (b. 1872)
  - Jan Graliński, Polish general (b. 1895)
- January 13
  - Vladimir Ignatowski, Soviet physicist (b. 1875)
  - Emil Szramek, Polish Roman Catholic priest, martyr and saint (b. 1887)
  - Albert Jean Baptiste Marie Vayssière, French biologist and scientist (b. 1854)
- January 16
  - Prince Arthur, Duke of Connaught and Strathearn, 2nd youngest son of Queen Victoria (b. 1850)
  - Sir Jeremiah Colman, 1st Baronet, British industrialist (b. 1859)
  - Carole Lombard, American actress (b. 1908)
- January 17 – Walther von Reichenau, German field marshal (b. 1884)
- January 18 – James P. Parker, United States Navy commodore (b. 1855)
- January 21
  - Christiaan Cornelissen, Dutch writer, economic and trade unionist (b. 1864)
  - Isidoro Diéguez Dueñas, Spanish bricklayer (b. 1909)
  - Jesús Larrañaga, Spanish communist leader (b. 1901)
- January 22
  - Walter Sickert, British Impressionist painter (b. 1860)
  - Racho Petrov, Bulgarian general and politician, 12th Prime Minister of Bulgaria (b. 1861)
- January 23
  - Prince Ludwig Gaston of Saxe-Coburg and Gotha (b. 1870)
  - Nazareno Strampelli, Italian agronomist and plant breeder (b. 1866)
- January 26 – Felix Hausdorff, German mathematician (suicide) (b. 1868)
- January 27 – Kaarel Eenpalu, Estonian journalist and politician, 7th Prime Minister of Estonia (b. 1888)
- January 29 –
  - Viktor Esbensen, Norwegian mariner (b. 1881)
  - Alice Sollier, 1887 became the first black French woman to qualify as a medical doctor (b. 1861)

=== February ===
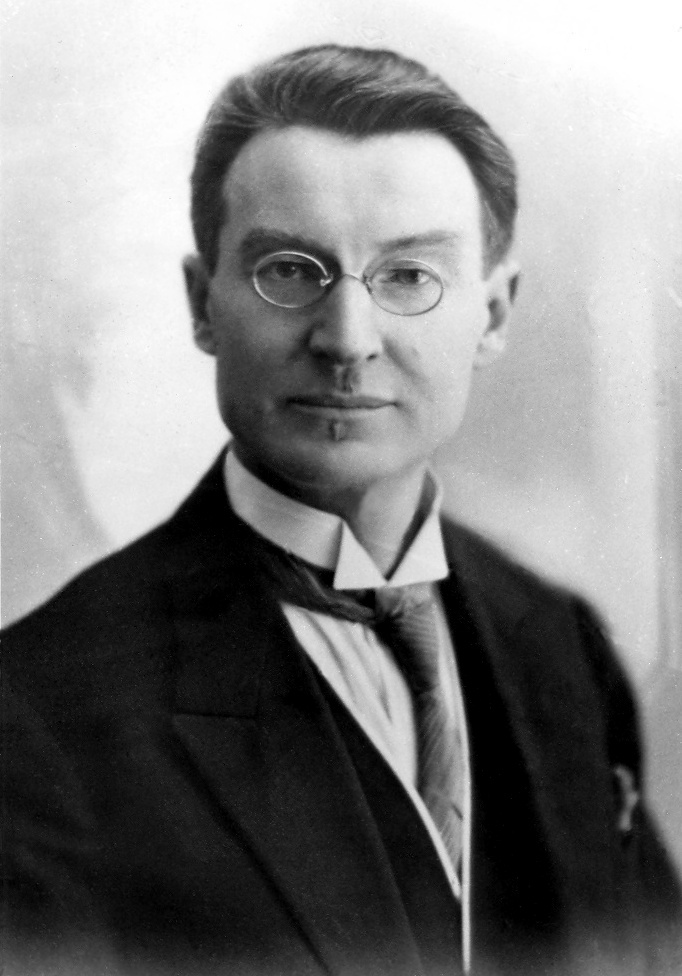
Ado Birk

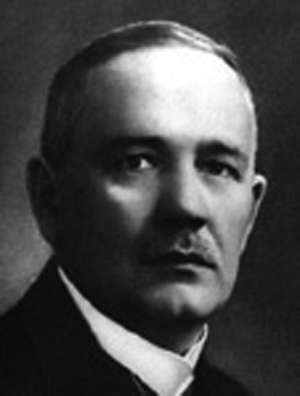
Lauri Kristian Relander

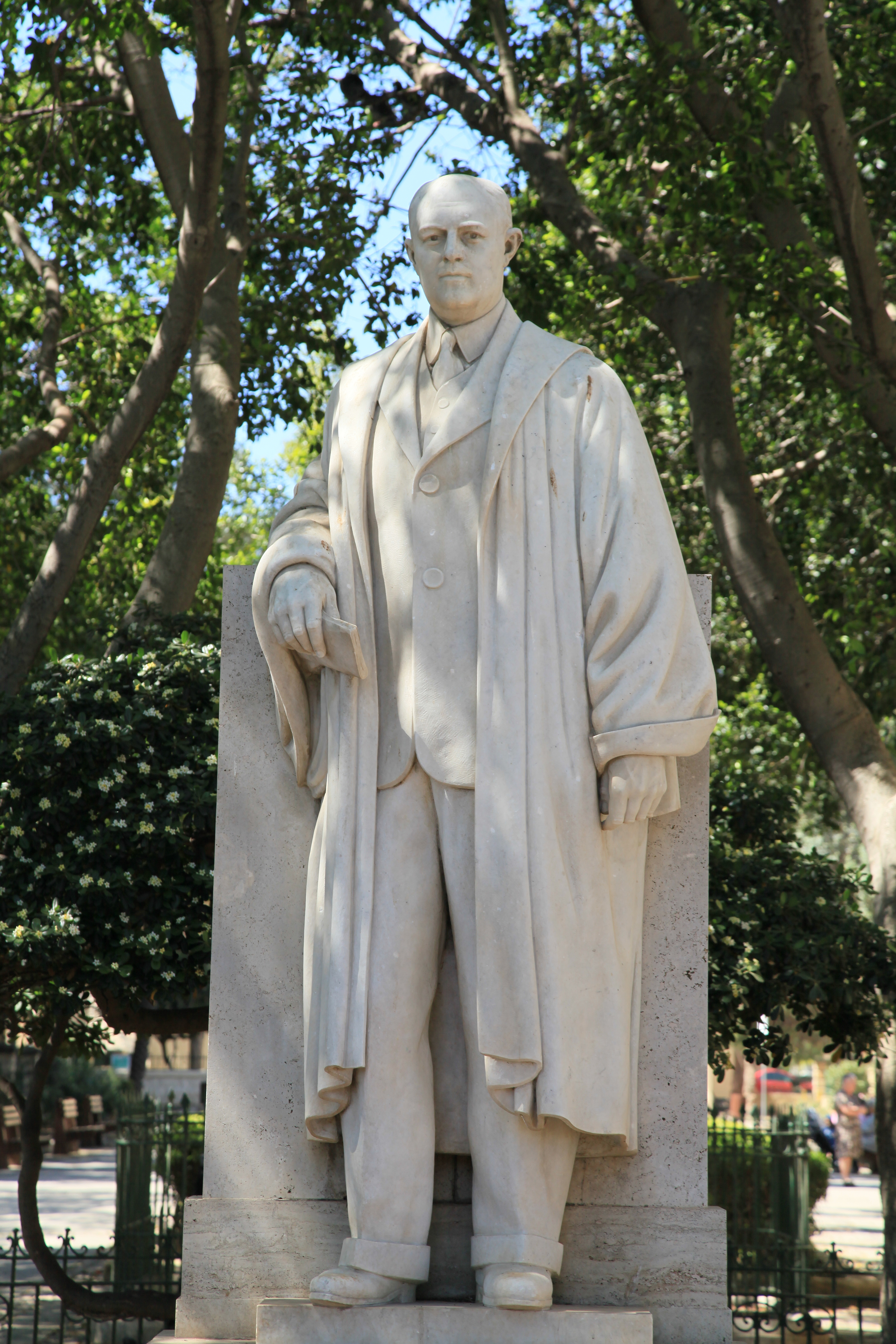
Ugo Pasquale Mifsud

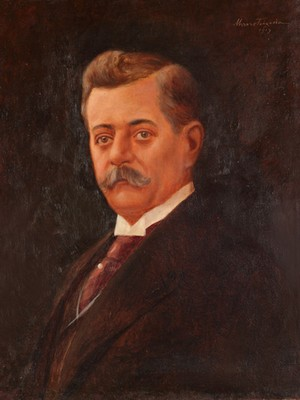
Epitácio Pessoa

- February 2
  - Ado Birk, Estonian politician, 3rd Prime Minister of Estonia (b. 1883)
  - Leonetto Cappiello, Italian poster designer and painter (b. 1875)
- February 7 – Dorando Pietri, Italian Olympic athlete (b. 1885)
- February 8 – Fritz Todt, Nazi German engineer (b. 1891)
- February 9 – Lauri Kristian Relander, 2nd President of Finland (b. 1883)
- February 11
  - Jamnalal Bajaj, Indian industrialist and philanthropist (b. 1889)
  - Sir Ugo Pasquale Mifsud, 3rd Prime Minister of Malta (b. 1889)
- February 12 – Grant Wood, American painter (b. 1891)
- February 13
  - Otakar Batlička, Czech adventurer and journalist (b. 1895)
  - Epitácio Pessoa, Brazil jurist and politician, 11th President of Brazil (b. 1865)
- February 14 – Mirosław Ferić, Polish WWII fighter pilot (b. 1915)
- February 16 – Ettore Arrigoni degli Oddi, Italian ornithologist (b. 1867)
- February 19 – Frank Abbandando, American gangster (b. 1910)
- February 20 – Hamad ibn Isa Al Khalifa, Ruler of Bahrain (b. 1872)
- February 22 – Stefan Zweig, Austrian writer (b. 1881)
- February 24 – Anton Drexler, German far-right politician (b. 1884)
- February 27
  - Robert William Chapman, Australian engineer and mathematician (b. 1866)
  - Joseph Emile Harley, American army officer and politician (b. 1880)
- February 28
  - Karel Doorman, Dutch admiral (b. 1889)
  - Oskar Fischer, Czech Scientist (b. 1876)

=== March ===
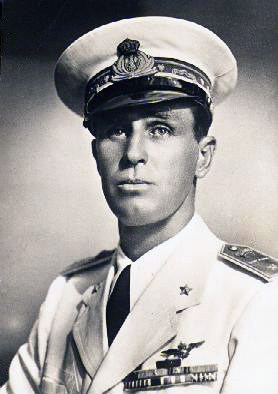
Prince Amedeo, Duke of Aosta

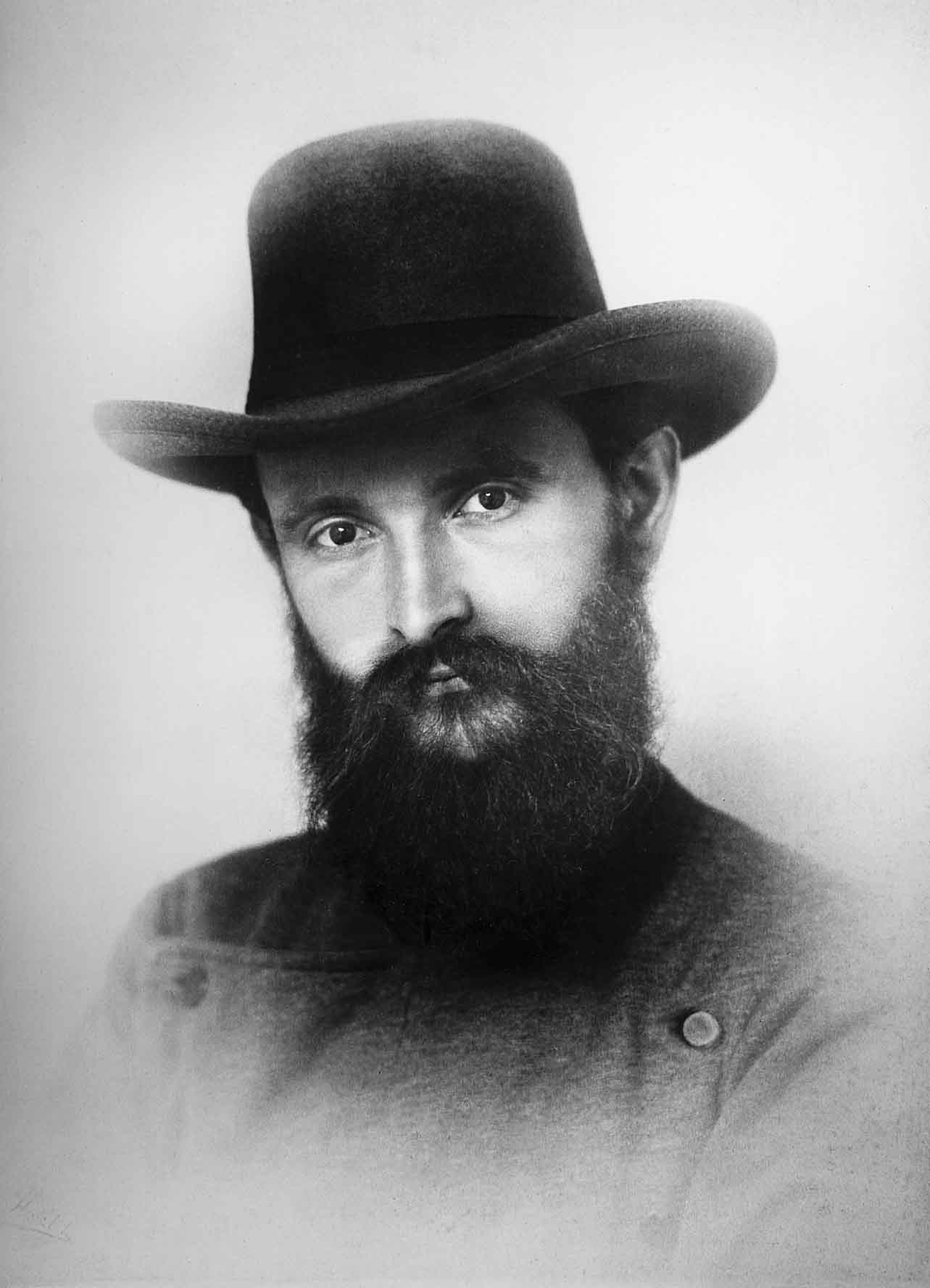
Robert Bosch

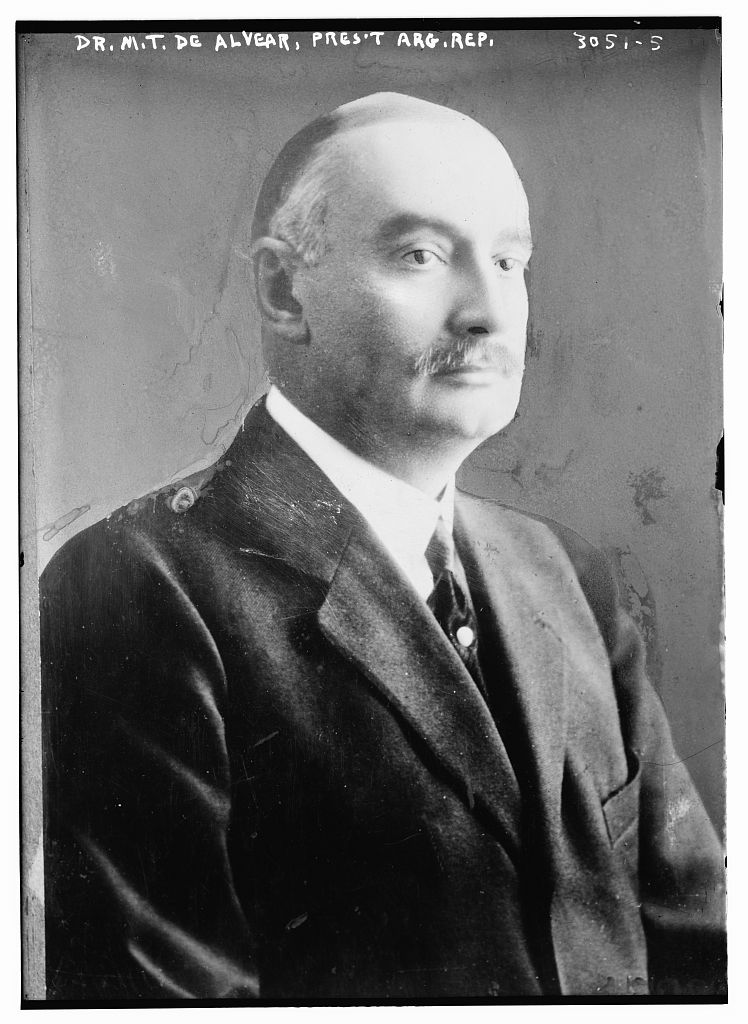
Marcelo Torcuato de Alvear

- March 1
  - George S. Rentz, United States Navy Chaplain and Navy Cross winner (b. 1882)
  - Cornelius Vanderbilt III, American military officer, inventor, and engineer (b. 1873)
- March 2
  - Gustave Anjou, Swedish genealogist (b. 1863)
  - Sergei Solovyov, Soviet Orthodox priest and blessed (b. 1885)
- March 3 – Prince Amedeo, Duke of Aosta, Italian nobleman and military officer, Viceroy of Italian East Africa (b. 1898)
- March 4 – Gheorghe Adamescu, Romanian historian and bibliographer (b. 1869)
- March 7 – Pierre Semard, French Communist leader (b. 1887)
- March 8 – José Raúl Capablanca, Cuban chess player (b. 1888)
- March 10 – Frederick Behre, American artist (b. 1863)
- March 11
  - José Camprubí, Spanish publisher (b. 1879)
  - Raoul Dandurand, Canadian politician (b. 1861)
  - Mildred Mansel, British suffragette (b. 1868)
- March 12
  - Robert Bosch, German industrialist, engineer and inventor (b. 1861)
  - Sir William Henry Bragg, British physicist, chemist and mathematician, Nobel Prize laureate (b. 1862)
  - Enric Morera i Viura, Andorran composer (b. 1865)
- March 14
  - René Bull, British illustrator and photographer (b. 1872)
  - Friedrich Karl Georg Fedde, German botanist (b. 1873)
- March 15 – Vasile Demetrius, Austro-Hungarian-born Romanian writer, poet and translator (b. 1878)
- March 17 – Nada Dimić, Yugoslav Communist leader (b. 1923)
- March 20 – Vasily Kalafati, Soviet and Russian composer (b. 1869)
- March 21 – J. S. Woodsworth, Canadian politician (b. 1874)
  - Václav Morávek, Czech general and warrior (b. 1904)
- March 23
  - Ludwig von Höhnel, Austrian naval officer and explorer (b. 1857)
  - Marcelo Torcuato de Alvear, 20th President of Argentina (b. 1868)
- March 24 – George Shiras III, American politician and one-term U.S. representative (1903–1905), son of George Shiras Jr. (b. 1859)
- March 26 – Gustav Hinrichs, German-born American conductor and composer (b. 1850)
- March 27
  - Jannion Steele Elliott, British ornithologist and naturalist (b. 1871)
  - John W. Wilcox Jr., American admiral (lost overboard) (b. 1882)
  - Julio González, Spanish sculptor and painter (b. 1876)
- March 28 – Miguel Hernández, Spanish poet and playwright (b. 1910)

=== April ===
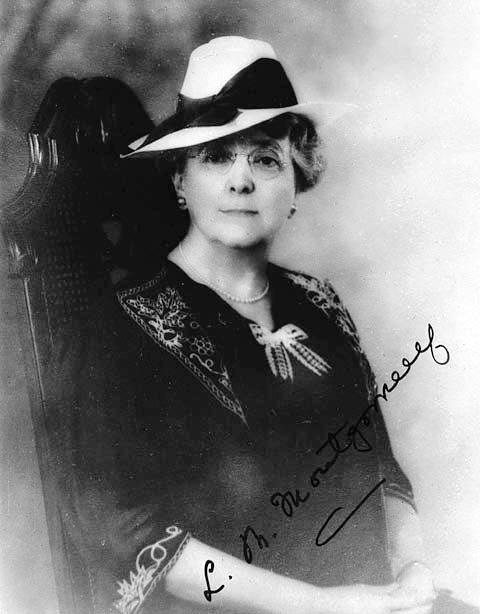
Lucy Maud Montgomery

- April 2 – Édouard Estaunié, French novelist (b. 1862)
- April 4
  - James Bede, American politician (b. 1856)
  - Jan Daszewski, Polish fighter pilot (b. 1916)
- April 6 – Isidro Michel López, Mexican military officer, leader of the Mexican Revolution (b. 1870)
- April 7 – Anandshankar Dhruv, Indian scholar, writer, educationist and editor (b. 1869)
- April 11 – Frederick Hobbs, New Zealand-born singer and actor (b. 1874)
- April 12 – Arnold Keppel, 8th Earl of Albemarle, British soldier and politician (b. 1858)
- April 13
  - Julia Danzas, Soviet and Russian Roman Catholic religious leader and blessed (b. 1879)
  - Sir James Fergusson, British admiral (b. 1881)
- April 14 – David Wanklyn, British naval officer, Victoria Cross recipient (b. 1911)
- April 15
  - Robert Musil, Austrian novelist (b. 1880)
  - Joshua Pim, Irish tennis player (b. 1869)
- April 16 – Princess Alexandra of Saxe-Coburg and Gotha, granddaughter of Queen Victoria (b. 1878)
- April 17
  - Renward Brandstetter, Swiss philologist and linguist (b. 1860)
  - Adolph Daniel Edward Elmer, American botanist (b. 1870)
  - Jean Baptiste Perrin, French physicist, Nobel Prize laureate (b. 1870)
- April 18
  - Grażyna Chrostowska, Polish poet and activist (b. 1921)
  - Gertrude Vanderbilt Whitney, American heiress, socialite and sculptor (b. 1875)
- April 21 – Gustav Stickley, American furniture designer and architect (b. 1858)
- April 23 – Olga Benário Prestes, German-born Brazilian militant (b. 1908)
- April 24
  - Camille du Gast, French pioneer (b. 1868)
  - Deenanath Mangeshkar, Indian singer and composer (b. 1900)
  - Lucy Maud Montgomery, Canadian writer (b. 1874)
- April 25 – Zygmunt Kisielewski, Polish writer (b. 1882)
- April 30 – Lilian Whiting, American writer and editor (b. 1847)

=== May ===
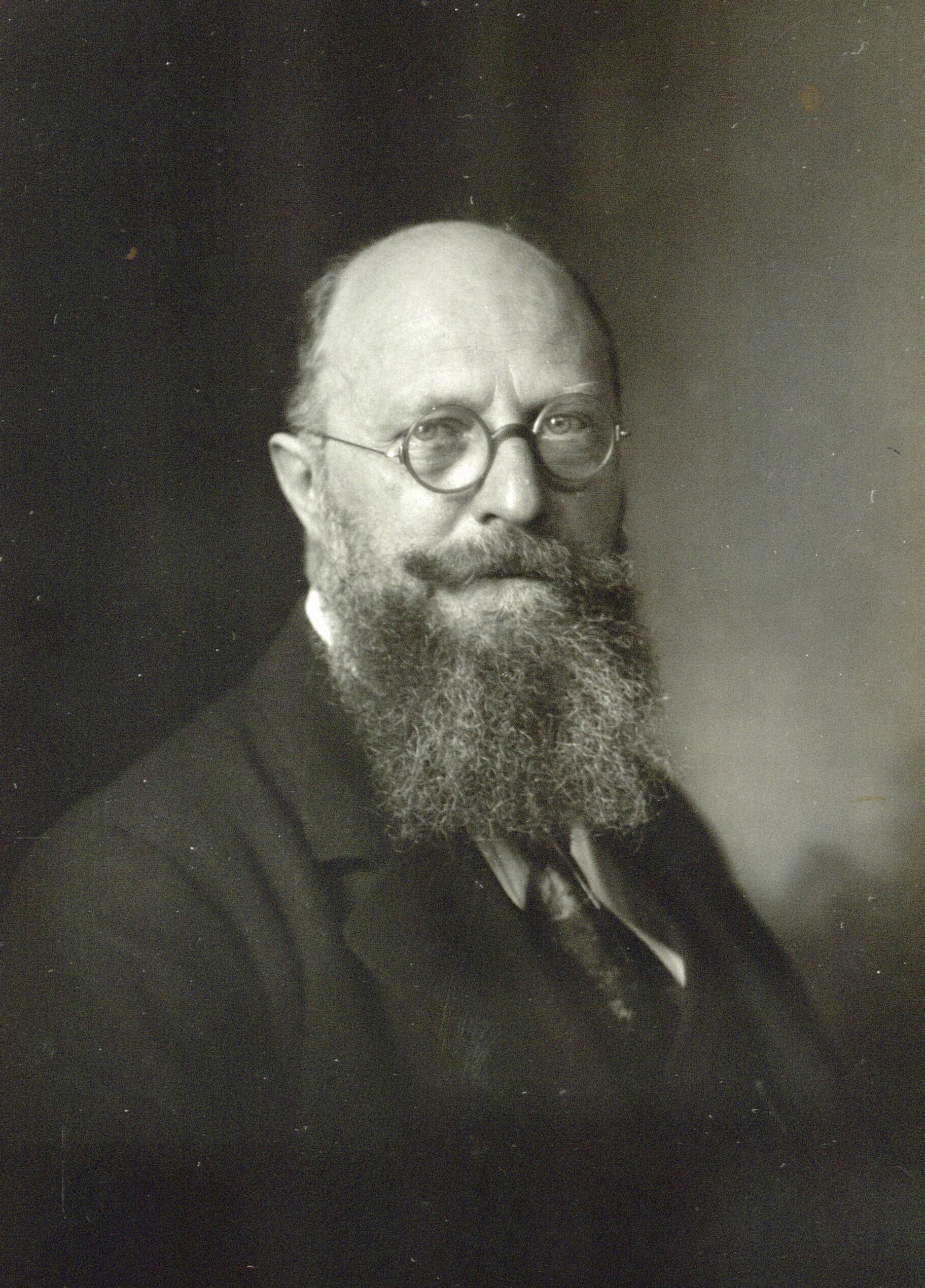
Thorvald Stauning

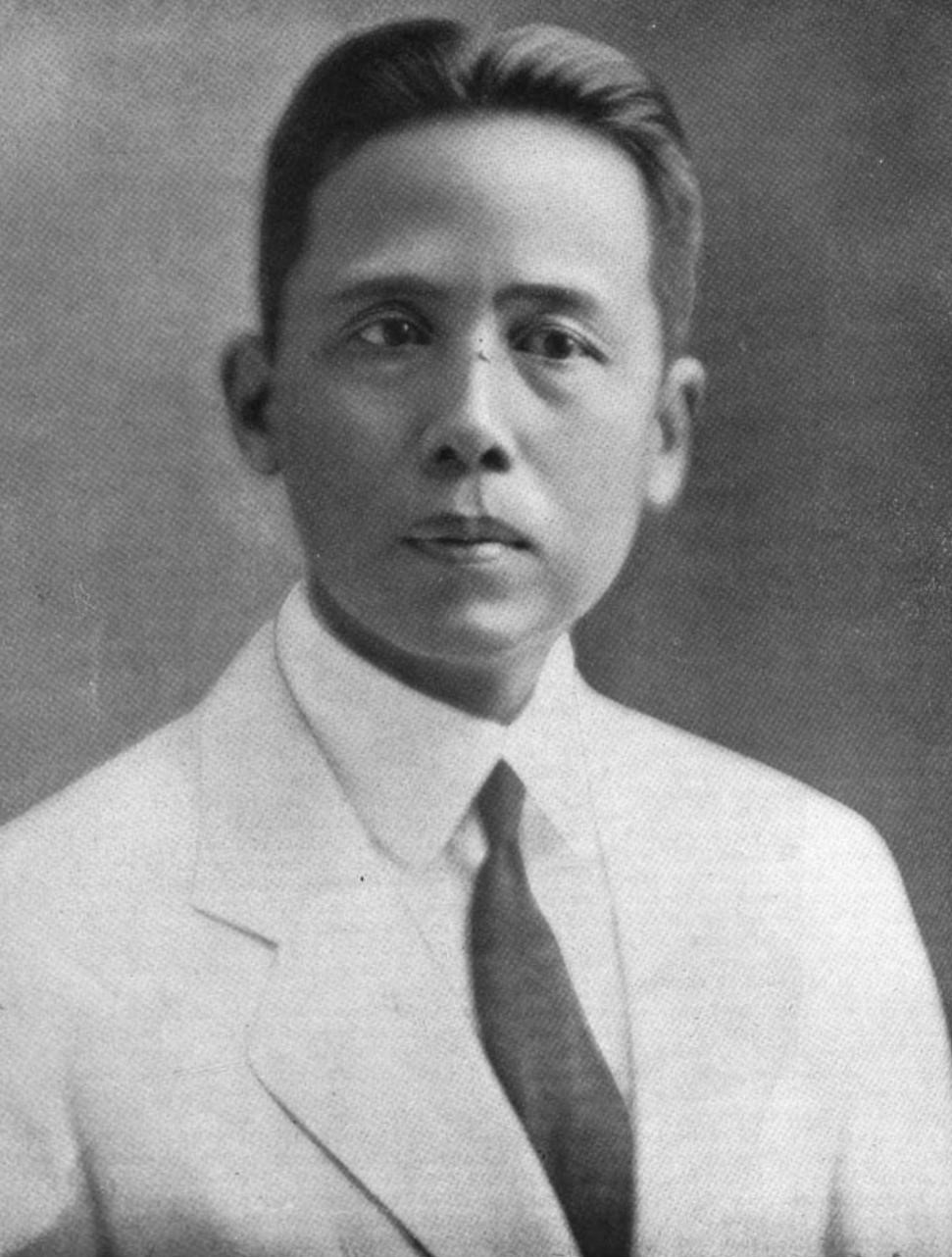
José Abad Santos

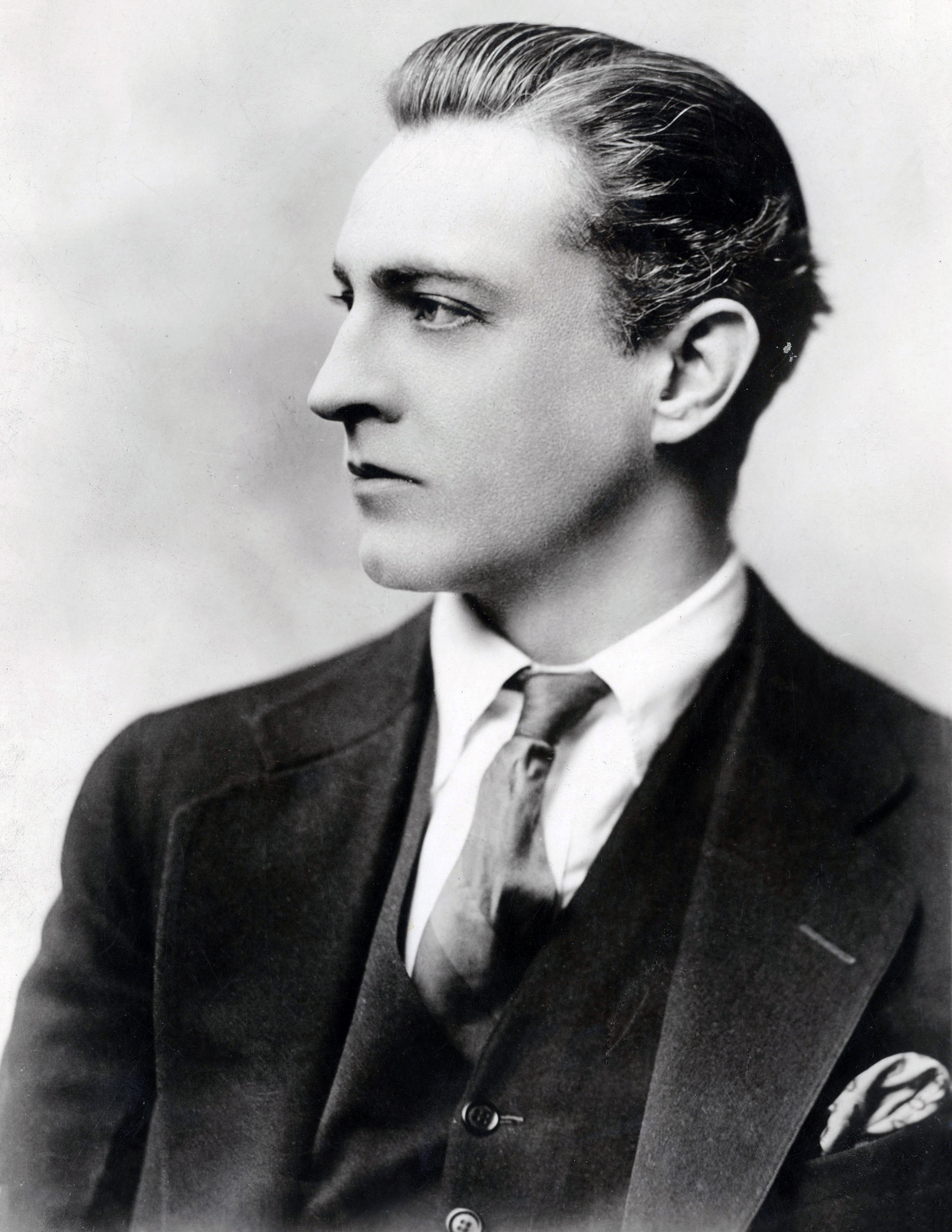
John Barrymore

- May 1 – José Abad Santos, Filipino chief justice of the Supreme Court (b. 1886)
- May 3 – Thorvald Stauning, 9th Prime Minister of Denmark (b. 1873)
- May 4 – Józef Czempiel, Polish Roman Catholic priest, martyr and blessed (b. 1883)
- May 5 – Habib Pacha Es-Saad, 3rd Prime Minister and 2nd President of Lebanon (b. 1867)
- May 7 – Felix Weingartner, Austrian conductor (b. 1863)
- May 9 – Graham McNamee, American radio announcer (b. 1888)
- May 10 – Joe Weber, American vaudevillian (b. 1867)
- May 11 – Sakutarō Hagiwara, Japanese poet and writer (b. 1886)
- May 12 – Hannu Hannuksela, Finnish general (b. 1893)
- May 14 – Frank Churchill, American composer (b. 1901)
- May 16
  - Kaneko Kentarō, Japanese diplomat and statesman (b. 1853)
  - Bronisław Malinowski, Polish anthropologist (b. 1884)
  - Maria Michał Kowalski, Polish priest and blessed (b. 1871)
- May 19 – A. E. Waite, British occultist (b. 1857)
- May 20
  - John D. Craddock, American politician (b. 1881)
  - Charles E. Dietrich, American politician (b. 1889)
  - John Goodall, English footballer (b. 1863)
- May 22 – Stjepan Filipović, Yugoslav national hero (b. 1916)
- May 24 – Ivan Horbachevsky, Austrian chemist and politician (b. 1854)
- May 25 – Emanuel Feuermann, Austrian cellist (b. 1902)
- May 27 – Chen Duxiu, General Secretary of the Chinese Communist Party (b. 1879)
- May 29
  - John Barrymore, American actor (b. 1882)
  - Akiko Yosano, Japanese author and poet (b. 1878)
- May 30 – Félix Cadras, French lace designer and militant (b. 1906)

=== June ===
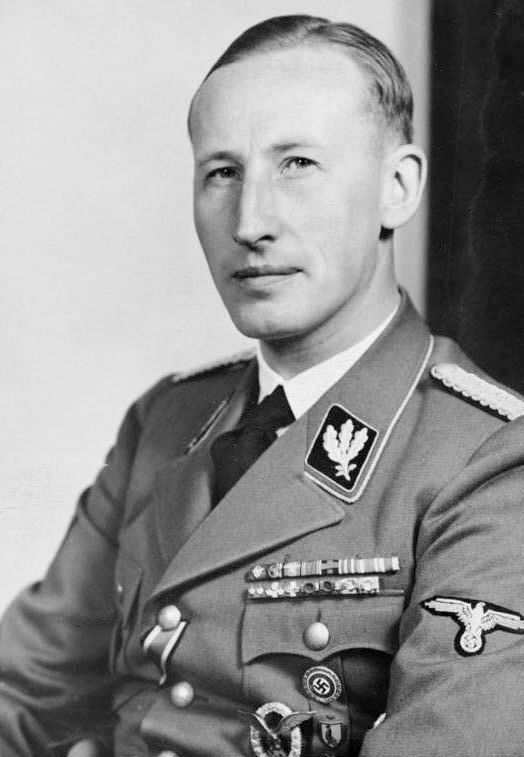
Reinhard Heydrich

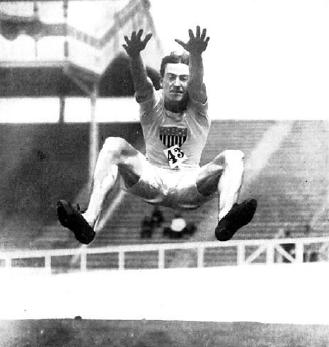
Frank Irons

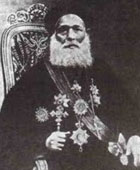
Pope John XIX of Alexandria

- June 4
  - Eusebio Ayala, 29th President of Paraguay (1921–23, 1932–36) (b. 1875)
  - Reinhard Heydrich, headed the Nazi Reich Main Security Office and was Reich governor of Bohemia and Moravia (b. 1904)
  - Eugene E. Lindsey, United States Navy officer (b. 1905)
- June 5
  - Virginia Lee Corbin, American actress (b. 1910)
  - Tamon Yamaguchi, Japanese admiral, killed in action at the Battle of Midway (b. 1892)
  - Ryusaku Yanagimoto, Japanese rear admiral, killed in action at the Battle of Midway (b. 1894)
- June 7 – Alan Blumlein, British electronics engineer (b. 1903)
- June 11
  - Charles Berthézenne, French politician (b. 1871)
  - Michael Kitzelmann, German army officer (b. 1916)
- June 14 – Fyodor Braun, Soviet-born German scholar (b. 1862)
- June 15 – Kushal Konwar, Indian freedom fighters (b. 1905)
- June 18
  - Jozef Gabčík, Slovak soldier and resistance fighter, a member of the team part of Operation Anthropoid (b. 1912)
  - David Hawthorne, British actor (b. 1888)
  - Jan Kubiš, Czech soldier and resistance fighter, a member of the team part of Operation Anthropoid (b. 1913)
  - Adolf Opálka, Czech soldier and resistance fighter, a member of the team part of Operation Anthropoid (b. 1915)
  - Josef Valčík, Czech soldier and resistance fighter, a member of the team part of Operation Anthropoid (b. 1914)
- June 19
  - Ahmad II of Tunis, Ruler of Tunisia (b. 1862)
  - Alois Eliáš, Czech general and politician (b. 1890)
  - Frank Irons, American Olympic athlete (b. 1886)
- June 21 – Pope John XIX of Alexandria (b. 1855)
- June 22 – Branko Kadia, Jordan Misja and Perlat Rexhepi, Albanian student activists
- June 23 – William Couper, American sculptor (b. 1853)
- June 25 – Arthur Anderson, Australian architect (b. 1868)
- June 26
  - John Gary Evans, American politician (b. 1863)
  - Stanisław Skarżyński, Polish army officer (b. 1899)
  - Gene Stack, 1st American major league baseball player to be drafted during World War II as well as the first to die in service (b. 1920)
- June 30
  - Billy Bennett, American actor (b. 1887)
  - William Henry Jackson, American photographer (b. 1843)

=== July ===
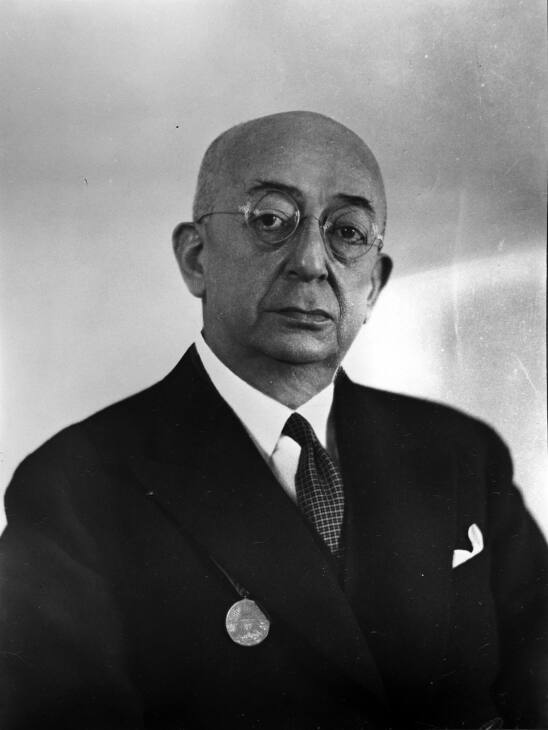
Refik Saydam

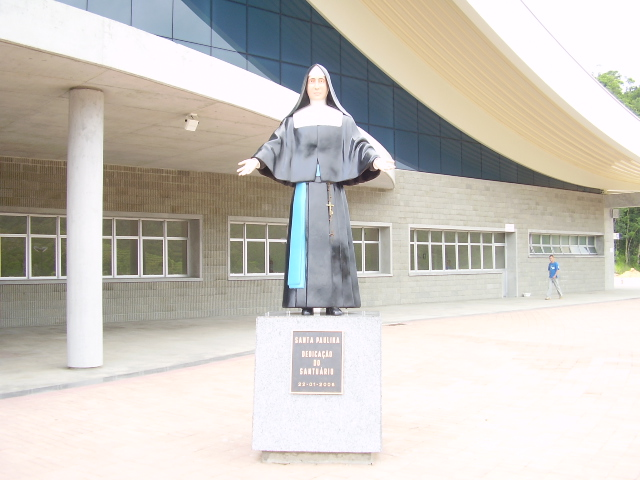
Saint Pauline of the Agonizing Heart of Jesus

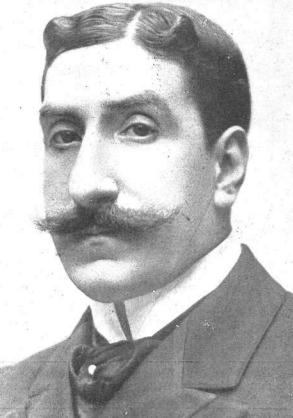
Joaquín Sánchez de Toca

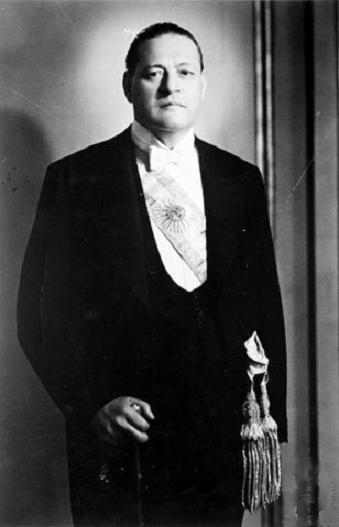
Roberto Maria Ortiz

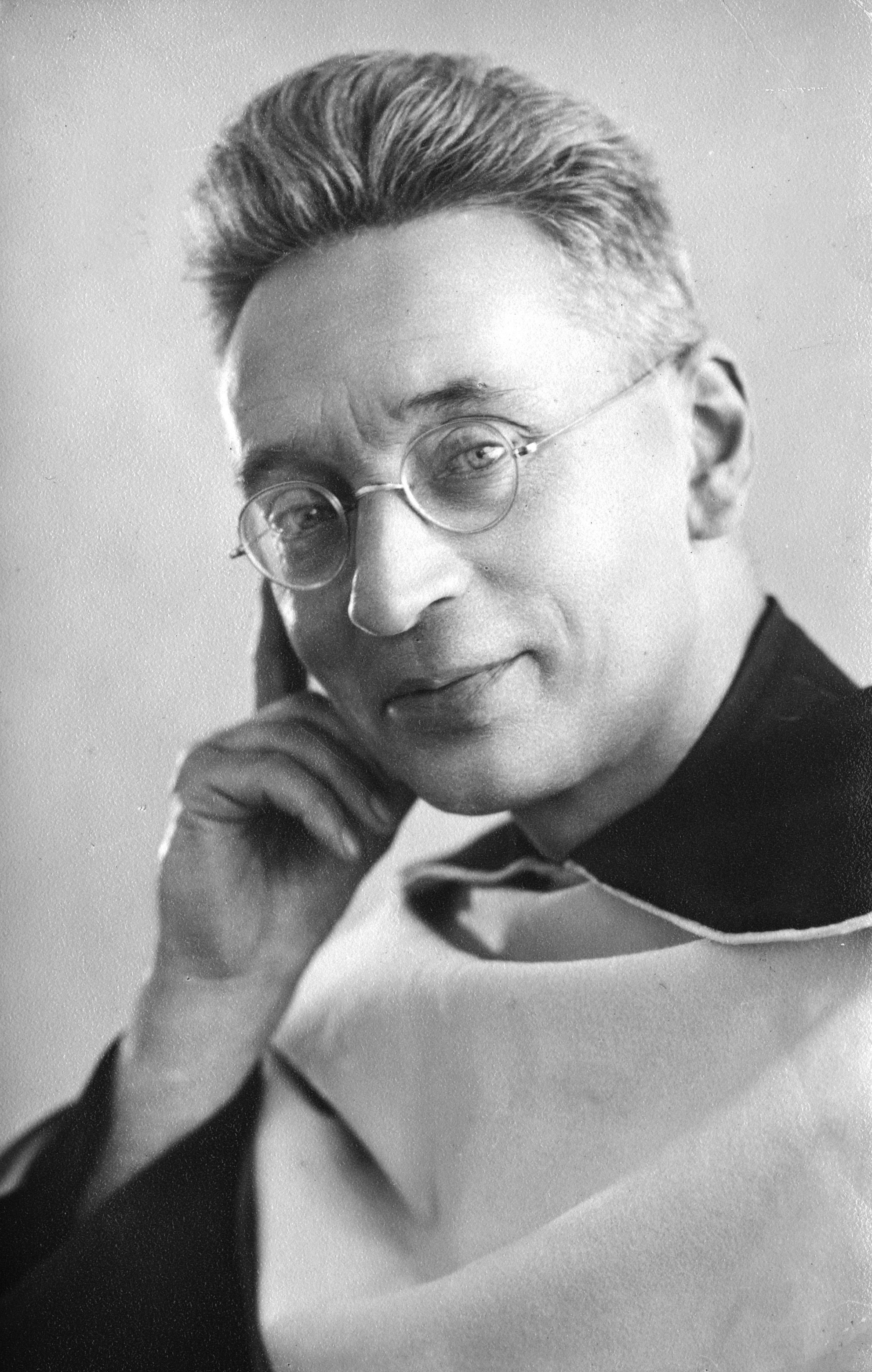
Titus Brandsma

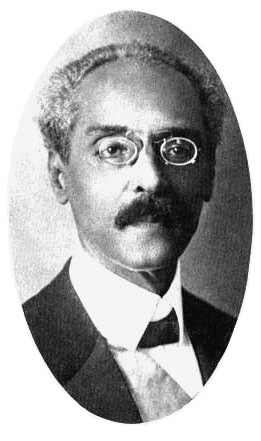
Louis Borno

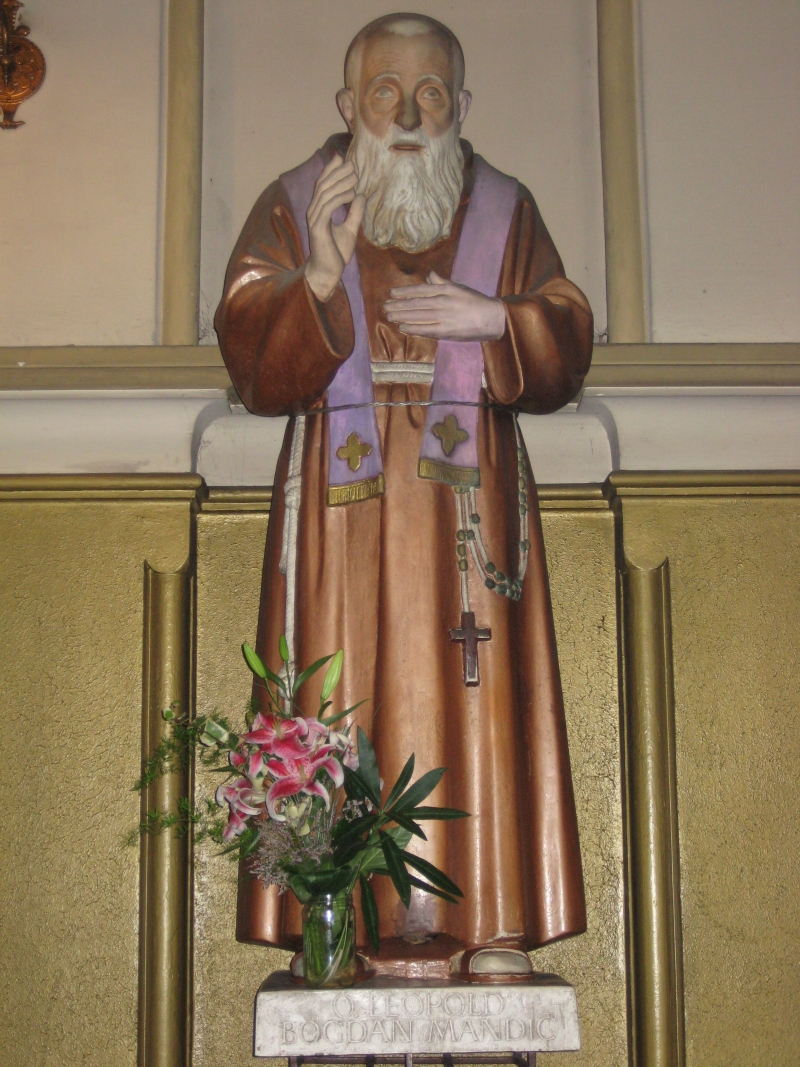
Leopold Mandić

- July 1
  - Peadar Toner Mac Fhionnlaoich, Irish-language writer (b. 1857)
  - Bolesław Wieniawa-Długoszowski, Polish general, diplomat and politician, Interim President of Poland (b. 1881)
- July 2
  - Rudi Čajavec, Yugoslav poet (b. 1911)
  - Joseph Domachowski, American politician (b. 1872)
- July 4 – Józef Kowalski, Polish Roman Catholic priest and blessed (b. 1911)
- July 8
  - Louis Franchet d'Espèrey, French general (b. 1856)
  - Refik Saydam, 4th Prime Minister of Turkey (b. 1881)
- July 9
  - Kelly Harrell, American surburbia musician (b. 1889)
  - Pauline of the Agonizing Heart of Jesus, Brazilian Roman Catholic religious sister and saint (b. 1865)
- July 12 – Mary Hayden, Irish historian and activist (b. 1862)
- July 13 – Joaquín Sánchez de Toca, Spanish conservative politician and Prime Minister of Spain (b. 1852)
- July 14 – Sébastien Faure, French anarchist and activist (b. 1858)
- July 15
  - Wenceslao Vinzons, Filipino politician and resistance leader (bayoneted to death) (b. 1910)
  - Roberto María Ortiz, 24th President of Argentina (b. 1886)
- July 16 – Sir Alfred Flux, British economist and statistician (b. 1867)
- July 17 – Tinus de Jongh, South African painter (b. 1885)
- July 18
  - George Beeby, Australian politician, judge and author (b. 1869)
  - George Sutherland, British-born American Supreme Court Justice (b. 1862)
- July 21 – Anton Mervar, Slovenian button accordion manufacturer (b. 1885)
- July 23
  - Arístides Chavier Arévalo, Puerto Rican composer and pianist (b. 1867)
  - Adam Czerniaków, Polish engineer and senator (suicide) (b. 1880)
- July 24 – Edwin Cooper, British architect (b. 1874)
- July 25 – Tom Reynolds, British actor (b. 1866)
- July 26
  - Roberto Arlt, Argentine writer (b. 1900)
  - Titus Brandsma, Dutch Discalced Carmelite friar, Roman Catholic priest and blessed (b. 1881)
- July 27
  - Karl Pärsimägi, Estonian fauvist painter (b. 1902)
  - Georgy Safarov, Bolshevik revolutionary and politician (b. 1891)
- July 28 – Sir Flinders Petrie, British Egyptologist (b. 1853)
- July 29 – Louis Borno, Haitian lawyer and politician, 28th President of Haiti (b. 1865)
- July 30
  - Jimmy Blanton, American bassist (b. 1918)
  - Leopold Mandić, Yugoslav Capuchin friar and Roman Catholic priest and saint (b. 1866)
- July 31
  - Jožka Jabůrková, Czech journalist, writer and translator (b. 1896)
  - Sir Francis Younghusband, British explorer and army officer (b.1863)

=== August ===
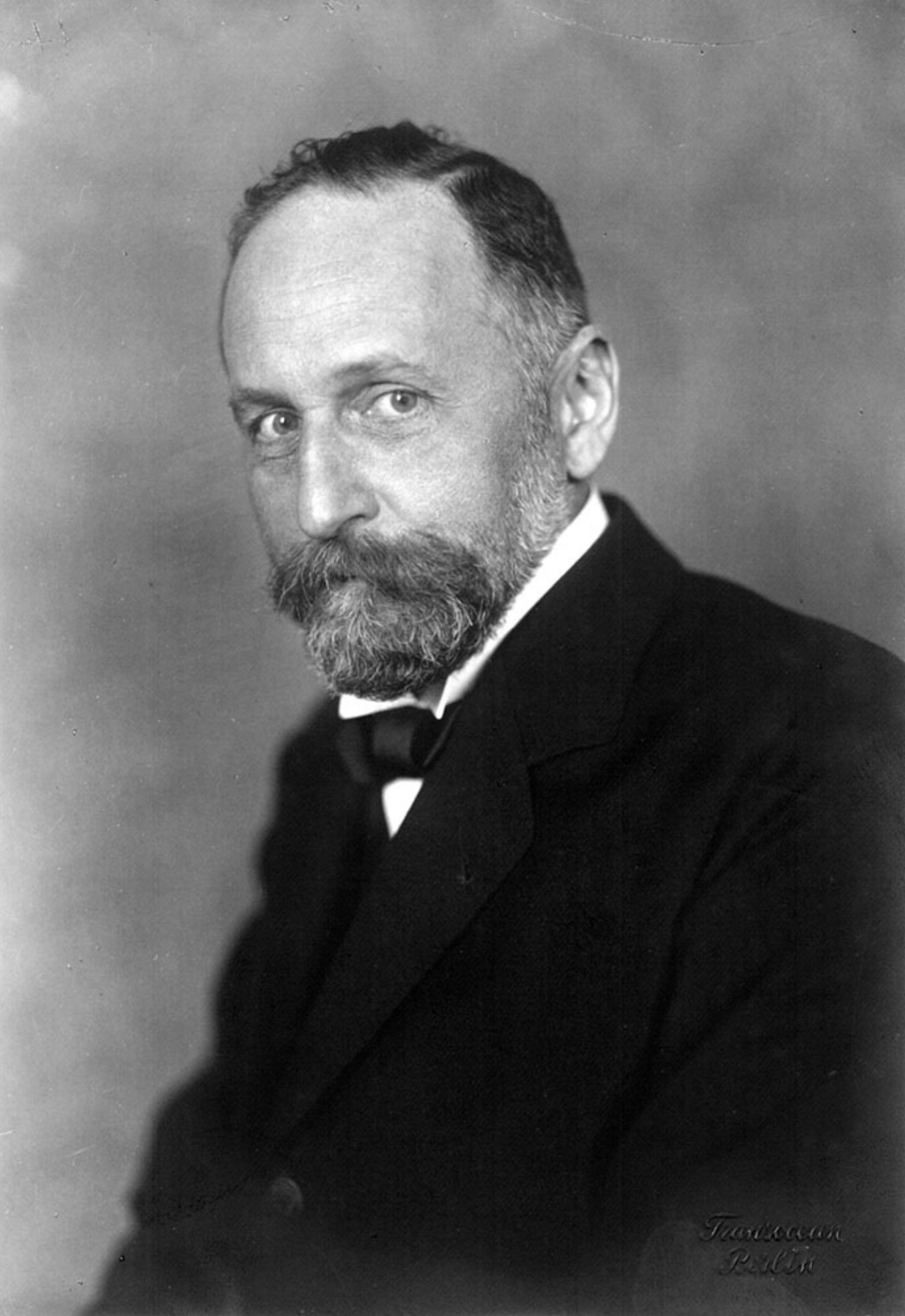
Richard Willstätter

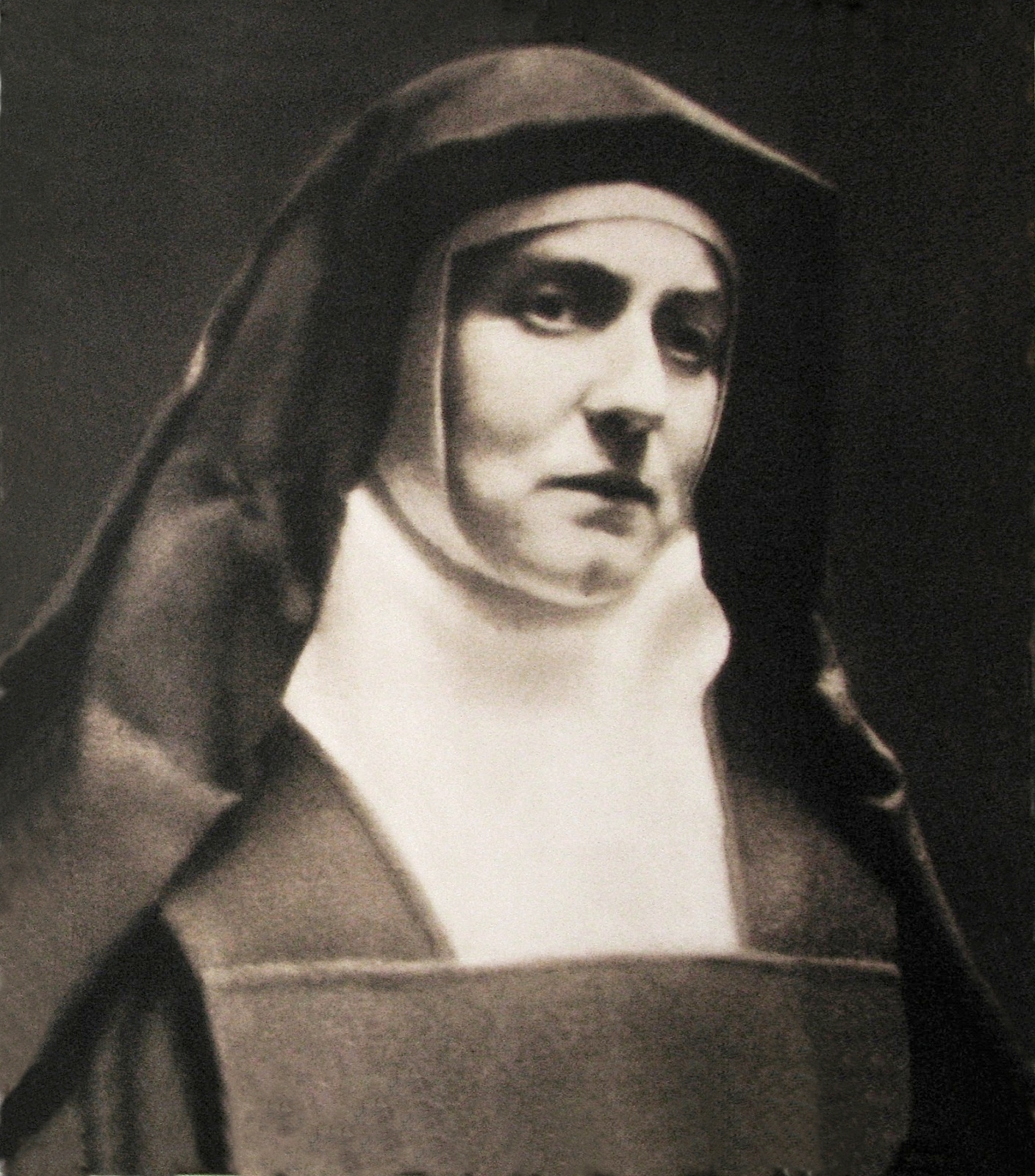
Saint Teresa Benedicta of the Cross

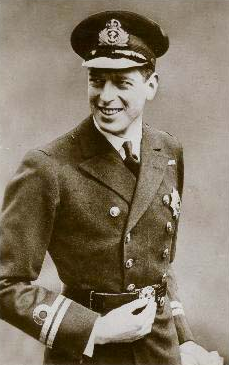
Prince George, Duke of Kent

- August 3
  - Franciszka Arnsztajnowa, Polish poet and playwright (b. 1865)
  - James Cruze, American actor and director (b. 1884)
  - Guglielmo Ferrero, Italian historian, journalist and novelist (b. 1871)
  - Gustav Indrebø, Norwegian philologist (b. 1889)
  - Richard Willstätter, German chemist, Nobel Prize laureate (b. 1872)
- August 7
  - Louis J. Carpellotti, American marine (b. 1918)
  - Charles E. Ford, American film director and producer (b. 1899)
  - Janusz Korczak, Polish educator, author and pediatrician (b. 1878)
- August 8 – Leopold Janikowski, Polish explorer and ethnographer (b. 1855)
- August 9 – Terea Benedicta of the Cross, German philosopher, Roman Catholic nun, martyr and saint (assassinated) (b. 1891)
- August 10 – Kazimierz Dembowski, Polish Roman Catholic clergyman and martyr (b. 1912)
- August 11 – Sabina Spielrein, Russian physician and psychoanalyst (b. 1885)
- August 12
  - Pasquale Amato, Italian baritone (b. 1878)
  - Mykola Burachek, Soviet painter (b. 1871)
  - Phillips Holmes, American actor (b. 1907)
- August 13
  - Jorge Cuesta, Mexican chemist, writer and editor (b. 1903)
  - Elina González Acha de Correa Morales, Argentinian educator, scientist and activist (b. 1861)
- August 15 – Mahadev Desai, Indian independence activist and writer (b. 1892)
- August 16 – André Heuzé, French director, screenwriter and playwright (b. 1880)
- August 18
  - Agathe Lasch, German philologist (b. 1879)
  - Henry DeWitt Hamilton, American general (b. 1863)
- August 19 – Heinrich Rauchinger, Polish-born Austrian painter (b. 1858)
- August 21 – Kiyonao Ichiki, Japanese army officer (killed in action) (b. 1892)
- August 22 – Michel Fokine, Soviet choreographer and dancer (b. 1880)
- August 23
  - Jorge Colaço, Portuguese painter (b. 1868)
  - Franciszek Dachtera, Polish Roman Catholic priest, martyr and blessed (b. 1910)
- August 24
  - Doyle Clayton Barnes, American naval aviator (b. 1912)
  - Edward Kaźmierski, Polish Roman Catholic priest, martyr and blessed (b. 1919)
- August 25
  - Prince George, Duke of Kent, 4th eldest son of George V (b. 1902)
  - Józef Lewartowski, Polish politician and revolutionary (b. 1895)
- August 26 – Irena Bernášková, Czech journalist and resistance member (b. 1904)
- August 27 – Lev Nussimbaum, Russian and Azerbaijani novelist (b. 1905)
- August 28 – Archduke Joseph Ferdinand of Austria (b. 1872)
- August 29
  - Charles Urban, American film producer (b. 1867)
  - Fabio Fiallo, Dominican writer, poet and politician (b. 1866)
  - Dominik Jędrzejewski, Polish Roman Catholic priest, martyr and blessed (b. 1886)
- August 30 – Martin Kirschner, German surgeon (b. 1869)

=== September ===
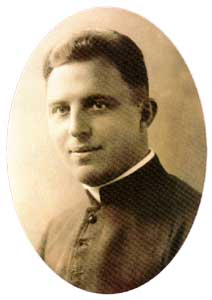
Blessed Adam Bargielski

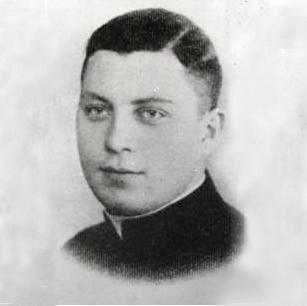
Blessed Bronisław Kostkowski

- September 1 – Clotilde Apponyi, Hungarian women's rights activist and diplomat (b. 1867)
- September 3 – Rubén Ruiz Ibárruri, Spanish communist leader (b. 1920)
- September 4 – Herbert A. Calcaterra, American navy sailor (b. 1920)
- September 5 – François de Labouchère, French pilot (b. 1917)
- September 7
  - Cecilia Beaux, American portraitist (b. 1855)
  - Huang Shaoqiang, Chinese painter (b. 1901)
- September 8 – Adam Bargielski, Polish Roman Catholic priest, martyr and blessed (b. 1903)
- September 9 – Adele Kurzweil, Austrian Holocaust victim (b. 1925)
- September 14
  - Sister Fausta Labrador, Filipino Roman Catholic nun and Servant of God (b. 1858)
  - E. S. Gosney, American philanthropist and eugenicist (b. 1855)
- September 20 – Kanaklata Barua, Indian freedom fighter (b. 1924)
- September 27
  - Fernando Díaz de Mendoza y Guerrero, Spanish actor (b. 1897)
  - Bronisław Kostkowski, Polish Roman Catholic priest, martyr and blessed (b. 1915)
- September 29 – Matangini Hazra, Indian revolutionary (shot) (b. 1870)
- September 30
  - Hans-Joachim Marseille, German World War II fighter ace (b. 1919)
  - Leonīds Breikšs, Latvian poet, journalist and patriot (b. 1908)
  - William V. Pacelli, American politician (b. 1893)

=== October ===
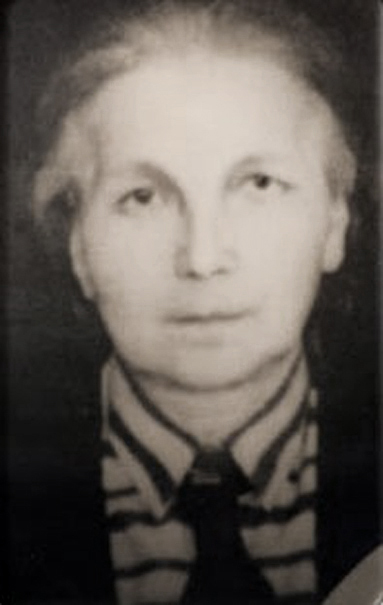
Blessed Maria Antonina Kratochwil

- October 1 – Ants Piip, 7th Prime Minister and 1st State Elder of Estonia (b. 1884)
- October 3 – Olaf Huseby, Norwegian-born American publisher (b. 1856)
- October 5
  - Giuseppe Cassioli, Italian painter and sculptor (b. 1865)
  - Dorothea Klumpke, American astronomer, Director of the Bureau of Measurements at the Paris Observatory (b. 1861)
- October 6
  - Lorenzo Aguirre, Spanish painter (b. 1884)
  - Wacław Wąsowicz, Polish painter (b. 1891)
- October 7 – Maria Antonina Kratochwil, Polish Roman Catholic nun, martyr and blessed (b. 1881)
- October 8 – Effie Ellsler, American actress (b. 1855)
- October 9 – William T. Hanna, American marine (b. 1920)
- October 10 – Arnold Majewski, Finnish military hero of Polish descent (killed in action) (b. 1892)
- October 12 – Aritomo Gotō, Japanese admiral (killed in action) (b. 1888)
- October 13 – Hong Yi, born Li Shutong, Chinese Buddhist artist, art teacher (b. 1880)
- October 15 – Dame Marie Tempest, British actress (b. 1864)
- October 16
  - Ulysses Argetsinger, American politician and lawyer, member of the Minnesota House of Representatives (b. 1866)
  - Leopold Poetsch, Austrian history teacher, high school teacher of Adolf Hitler and Adolf Eichmann (b. 1853)
- October 18 – Federico Ferrari Orsi, Italian army officer (b. 1886)
- October 19 – Paul Nikolaus Cossmann, German journalist (b. 1869)
- October 20 – May Robson, Australian actress (b. 1858)
- October 22 – Staf De Clercq, Belgian collaborator and nationalist (b. 1884)
- October 23 – Ralph Rainger, American composer and songwriter (b. 1901)
- October 24
  - Dimitri Amilakhvari, French military officer (b. 1906)
  - St John Hutchinson, British barrister and politician (b. 1884)
  - James C. Morton, American actor (b. 1884)
- October 25 – Gulbrand Lunde, Norwegian chemist and politician, Nazi collaborator (b. 1901)
- October 26 – William Finnemann, Filipino Roman Catholic priest, archbishop and servant of God (b. 1882)
- October 27 – Helmuth Hübener, German youth political activist against the Hitler regime (executed) (b. 1925)
- October 28 – Alexander von Dassel, German magistrate (b. 1854)
- October 31 – Emilio Caldara, Italian politician (b. 1868)

=== November ===
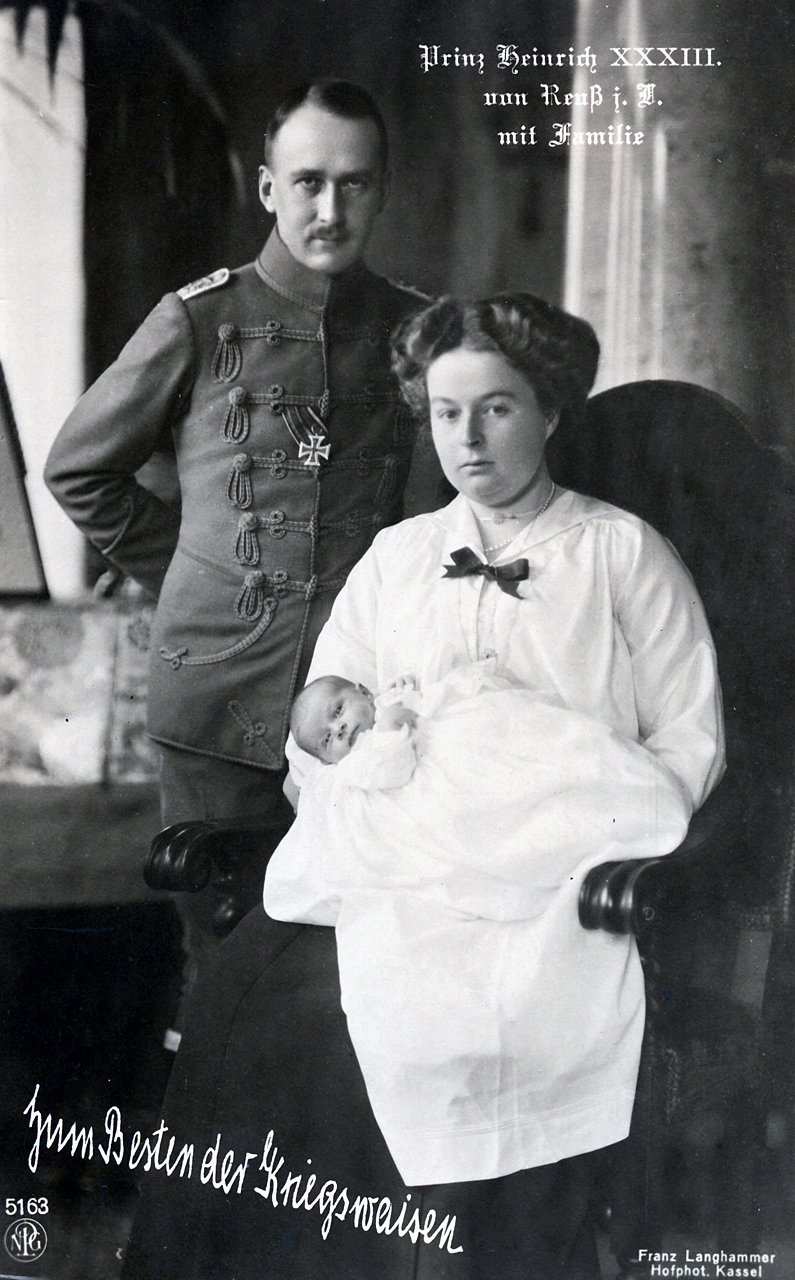
Prince Heinrich XXXIII Reuss of Köstritz

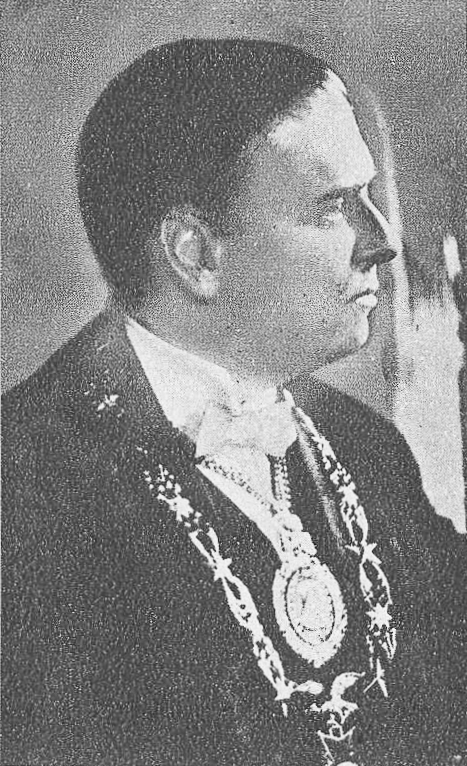
Hernando Siles Reyes

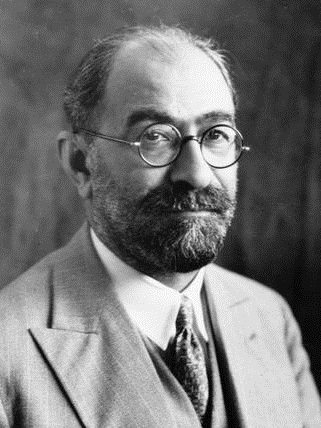
Mohammad Ali Foroughi

- November 1 – Hugo Distler, German composer (b. 1908)
- November 2 – Elihu Grant, American scholar and writer (b. 1873)
- November 3
  - Eric Abrahamsson, Swedish actor (b. 1890)
  - Amédé Ardoin, American musician (b. 1898)
- November 5
  - George M. Cohan, American songwriter and entertainer (b. 1878)
  - Kiyoura Keigo, Prime Minister of Japan (b. 1850)
- November 9 – Edna May Oliver, American actress (b. 1883)
- November 11
  - Hector Abbas, Dutch actor (b. 1884)
  - Merton Beckwith-Smith, British army officer (b. 1890)
- November 12 – Laura Hope Crews, American actress (b. 1879)
- November 13
  - Daniel J. Callaghan, American admiral and Medal of Honor recipient (b. 1890)
  - Norman Scott, American admiral and Medal of Honor recipient (b. 1889)
- November 15 – Prince Heinrich XXXIII Reuss of Köstritz (b. 1879)
- November 16 – Joseph Schmidt, Polish tenor (b. 1904)
- November 19
  - Ilya Fondaminsky, Soviet author (b. 1880)
  - Bruno Schulz, Polish writer and painter (shot) (b. 1892)
- November 21
  - Count Leopold Berchtold, Austro-Hungarian foreign minister (b. 1863)
  - J. B. M. Hertzog, Boer General and 3rd Prime Minister of South Africa (b. 1866)
- November 23
  - Tomitarō Horii, Japanese general (b. 1890)
  - Hernando Siles Reyes, Bolivian politician, 31st President of Bolivia (b. 1882)
- November 24 – Guido Masiero, Italian World War I flying ace and aviation pioneer (b. 1895)
- November 25 – Mihail Dragomirescu, Romanian aesthetician, theorist and critic (b. 1868)
- November 26
  - Mohammad Ali Foroughi, Iranian diplomat, politician, teacher and writer, 3-time Prime Minister of Iran (b. 1877)
  - Sigtryggur Jonasson, Canadian politician (b. 1852)
- November 27 – Hermann Harms, German botanist (b. 1870)
- November 28 – Marceli Nowotko, Polish activist (b. 1893)
- November 29 – William Stamps Farish II, American pioneer (b. 1881)
- November 30 – Buck Jones, American actor (b. 1891)

=== December ===
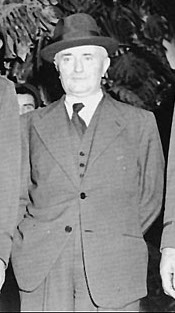
François Darlan

- December 1
  - Teddy Sheean, Royal Australian Navy sailor, killed in action at the Battle of Timor (b. 1923)
  - Leon Wachholz, Polish scientist and medical examiner (b. 1867)
- December 3 – Wilhelm Junk, Czech natural historian, bibliographer and entomologist (b. 1866)
- December 5 – Richard Tucker, American actor (b. 1884)
- December 6
  - Karl Herxheimer, German dermatologist (b. 1861)
  - Amos Rusie, American baseball player and MLB Hall of Famer (b. 1871)
- December 7 – Orland Steen Loomis, Governor of Wisconsin (b. 1893)
- December 8
  - Prince Eitel Friedrich of Prussia (b. 1883)
  - Albert Kahn, American architect (b. 1869)
- December 9 – Séraphine Louis, French painter (b. 1864)
- December 12
  - Robert Danneberg, Austrian politician (b. 1882)
  - Helen Westley, American actress (b. 1875)
- December 13
  - Hakeem Fateh Mohammad Sehwani, Indian scholar, poet, literary, journalist and politician (b. 1882)
  - Wlodimir Ledóchowski, Polish Jesuit priest and servant of God (b. 1866)
- December 17 – Edith Pretty, British landowner (b. 1883)
- December 19 – Carl Gustav Fleischer, Norwegian general (b. 1883)
- December 21 – Franz Boas, German anthropologist (b. 1858)
- December 22
  - Robert Kosch, Prussian general (b. 1856)
  - Richard-Heinrich von Reuss, German general, (killed in action) (b, 1896).
- December 23 – Konstantin Balmont, Soviet poet and translator (b. 1867)
- December 24 – François Darlan, French admiral and politician, 81st Prime Minister of France (assassinated) (b. 1881)
- December 26 – Jeanne Adnet, French anarchist and socialist (b. 1871)
- December 27 – William G. Morgan, American inventor of volleyball (b. 1870)
- December 30 – Sir Neville Henderson, British diplomat (b. 1882)
