= Giuseppe Allamano =

Italian Catholic priest (1851–1926)

Saint Giuseppe Allamano IMC
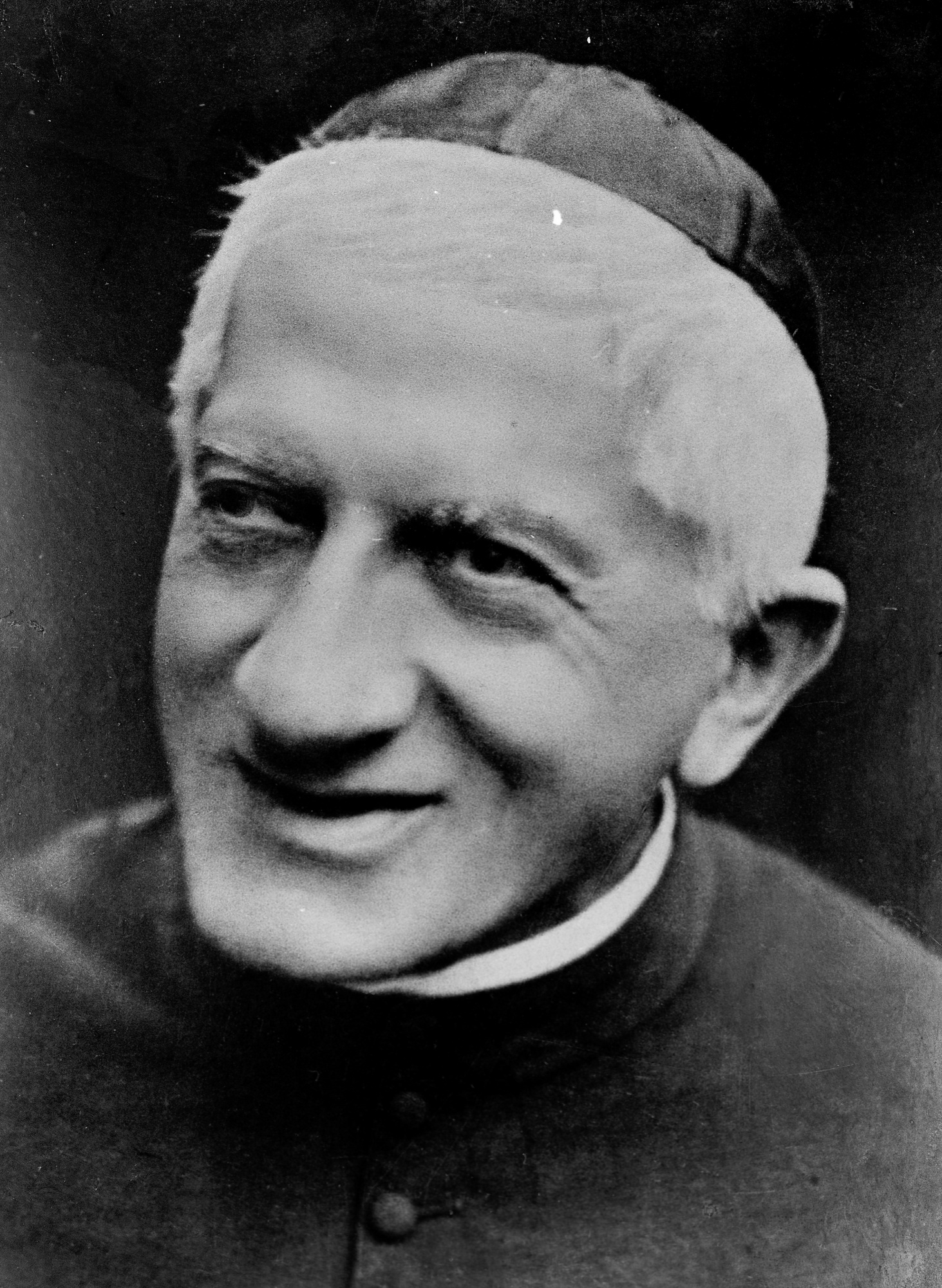
- Born: 21 January 1851; Castelnuovo, Asti, Kingdom of Sardinia
- Died: 16 February 1926 (aged 75); Turin, Kingdom of Italy
- Venerated in: Roman Catholic Church
- Beatified: 7 October 1990, Saint Peter's Square, Vatican City by Pope John Paul II
- Canonized: 20 October 2024, St. Peter's Basilica by Pope Francis
- Feast: 16 February

Giuseppe Allamano, IMC (21 January 1851 – 16 February 1926) was an Italian Catholic priest who established the Consolata Missionaries (IMC) for males and another for females, the Consolata Missionary Sisters. Allamano also served as the rector of the Santuario della Consolata and transformed the shrine into a source of spiritual renewal for the faithful. He was beatified in 1990 and canonized on 20 October 2024.

== Life ==
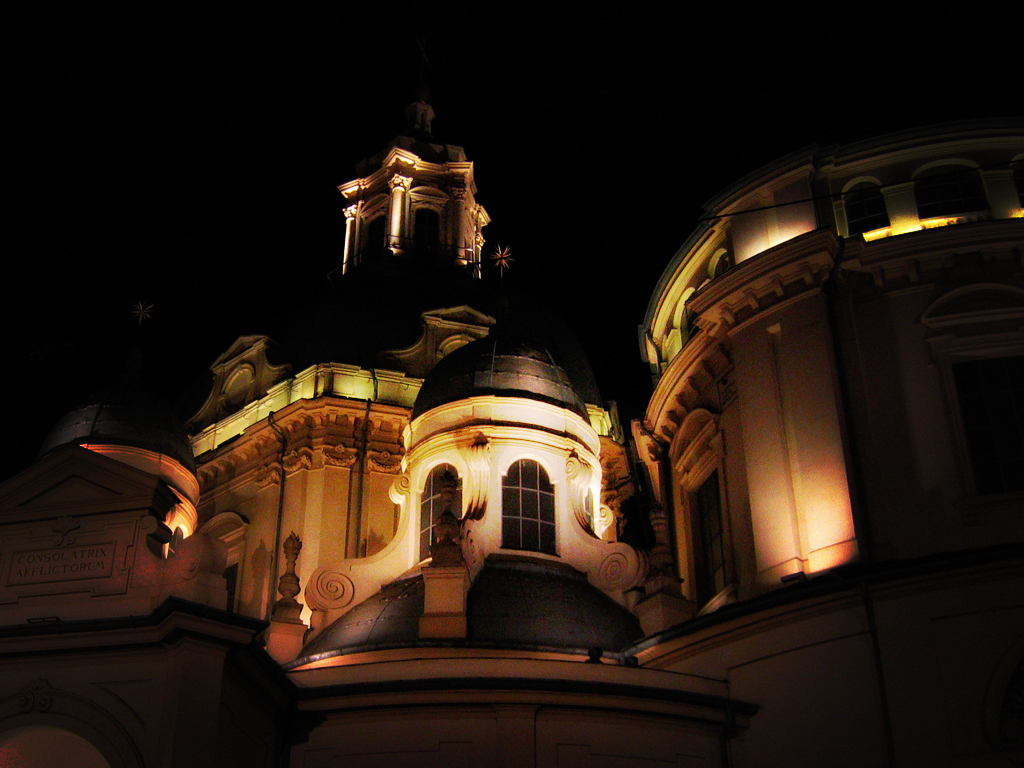
Santuario Della Consolata, Turin

Giuseppe Ottavio Allamano was born in Asti in 1851 as the fourth of five children to Joseph and Marianna Cafasso Allamano. His mother was the younger sister of Joseph Cafasso. His father died of anthrax when Giuseppe was three.

From 1861 to 1866, Allamano attended the Oratory of John Bosco in Valdocco. He commenced his studies to become a priest in Turin in November 1866, and was ordained to the priesthood on 20 September 1873. He was appointed spiritual director at the major seminary of the diocese of Turin. In 1876, he obtained a doctorate in theology. He was appointed as the rector of the Santuario della Consolata on 2 October 1880 and he maintained that position until his death. Between 1883 and 1885 he restructured the Sanctuary and repaired the roof. In 1899 he commissioned the architect Carlo Ceppi to expand the interior space for the faithful with the construction of four circular chapels. Allamano ensured that the shrine became a source of spiritual renewal.

Allamano also responded to requests for spiritual and material comfort of Turin supporting various social initiatives and promoting the Catholic newspapers. In 1899, he began publishing the monthly La Consolata.

== Consolata Missionaries ==
On recovering from a severe illness in 1891, he vowed to found a missionary society for priests and laymen. Thus the Consolata Missionaries was born on 29 January 1901. The first missionaries reached Kenya in 1902, joined in 1903 by the Sisters of Cottolengo. He also founded the Consolata Missionary Sisters for women on 29 January 1910.

Due to the increasing size of the Christian population, it became quite clear that there were not enough priests and brethren to cater to the pastoral needs of the people. Allamano expressed this deep concern to Pope Pius X during a visit to Rome in 1912. He urged the pope to do something and perhaps establish an annual mission day to awaken missionary vocations. War broke out in the Balkans, and the proposals were postponed. During World War I he worked to assist refugees and seminarians who were drafted. He also worked for the cause of his uncle, who was beatified in 1925.

Allamano died in Turin in February 1926.

=== Legacy ===
Allamano's idea for an annual day for missionaries came in 1927 when Pope Pius XI instituted World Mission Day.

== Beatification process ==
The diocesan process commenced in 1944 in Turin and concluded its work in 1951. Allamano's cause was formally opened in Rome on 19 January 1952, granting him the title of a Servant of God. It received the formal decree of ratification several decades later on 5 October 1984. In 1987 the Positio was submitted to the Roman Congregation for the Causes of Saints for further evaluation. On 13 May 1989, Pope John Paul IIdeclared Allamano venerable after he recognized that the late priest had lived a life of heroic virtue. A miracle attributed to Allamano's intercession was approved by Pope John Paul II on 10 July 1990. John Paul beatified Allamano on 7 October 1990.

On 7 February 1996, in the Amazon rainforest, Sorino Yanomami, a Cape Verde indigenous man, who was attacked by a jaguar suffered brain injury. After a Boa Vista neurosurgery coupled with his congregation's novena for the intercession of Blessed Allamano, Yanomami survived. On 23 May 2024 Pope Francis, after meeting with Prefect Marcello Semeraro of Dicastery for the Causes of Saints, recognized this as the second miracle and issued a Decree convening a Consistory of Cardinals to deliberate Allamano's canonization.

Allamano was canonised by Pope Francis on 20 October 2024.
