= Santuario della Consolata =

Sanctuary of Our Lady of Consolation
- Basilica of Saint Mary of Consolation
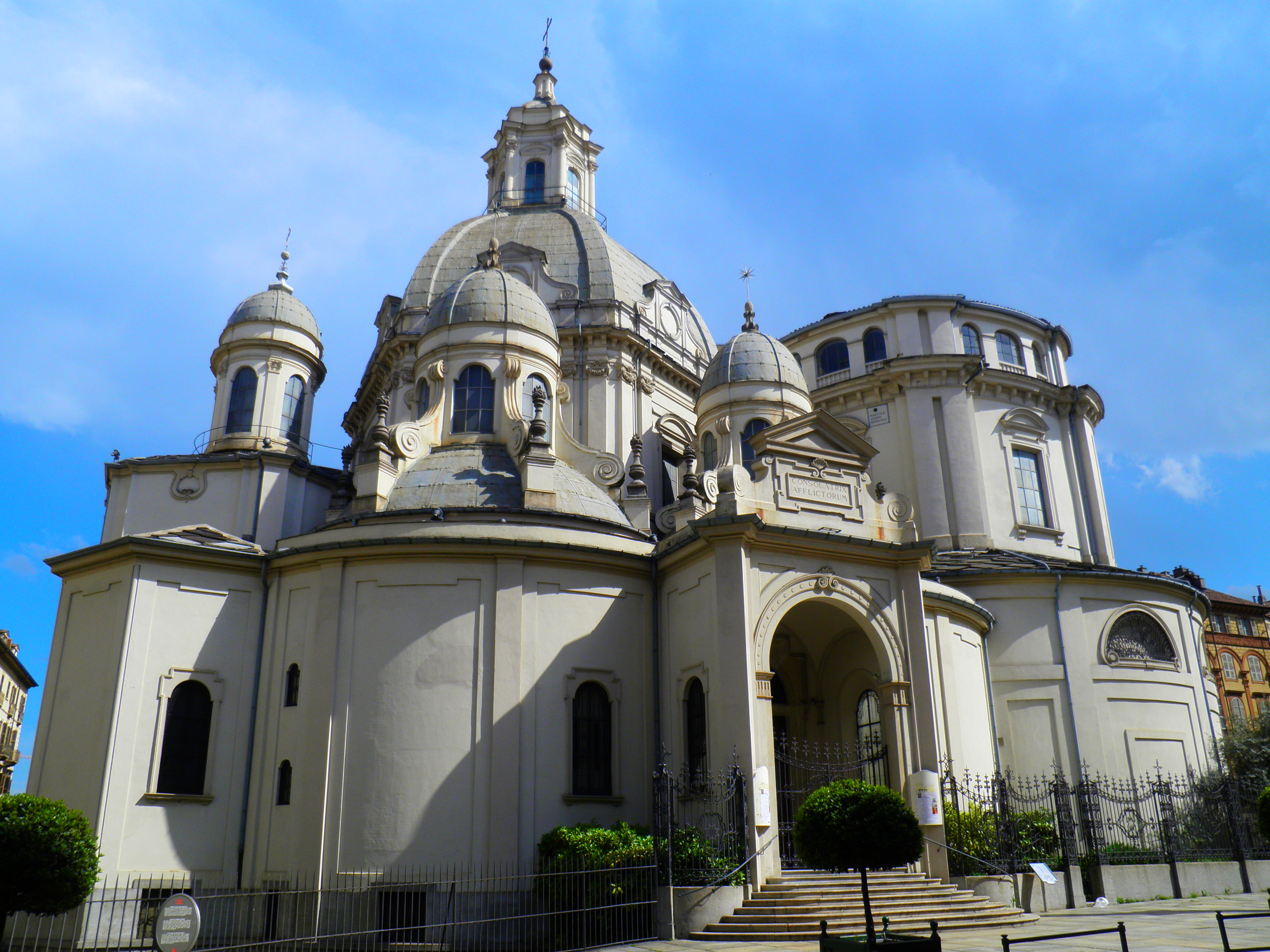

- Map of Turin
- 45°04′36″N 7°40′45″E
- Country: Italy
- Denomination: Roman Catholic Church

Architecture
- Architect: Guarino Guarini
- Style: Baroque

Administration
- Archdiocese: Turin

The Basilica of Saint Mary of Consolation (Italian: Basilica di Santa Maria della Consolazione), or the Sanctuary of Our Lady of Consolation (Italian: Santuario della Consolata), is a Roman Catholic minor basilica and Marian shrine in central Turin, Piedmont, Italy. Located on the intersection of Via Consolata and Via Carlo Ignazio Giulio, the shrine is dedicated to the Blessed Virgin Mary under the title of Our Lady of Consolation.

Pope Pius X granted a pontifical coronation towards the venerated icon of Madonna della Consolata on 18 June 1904. The same pontiff raised the shrine to the status of minor basilica by Pontifical Decree on 7 April 1906.

== History ==
The Benedictine Order were the first monastic order to settle in this location. A church at the site, probably dedicated to the Blessed Virgin Mary, stood adjacent to the ancient Roman walls of the city. It is held that in the 5th century, Bishop Maximus erected a church dedicated to Saint Andrew the Apostle with a small chapel to the Virgin with an icon. The icon, however, became the object of great veneration.

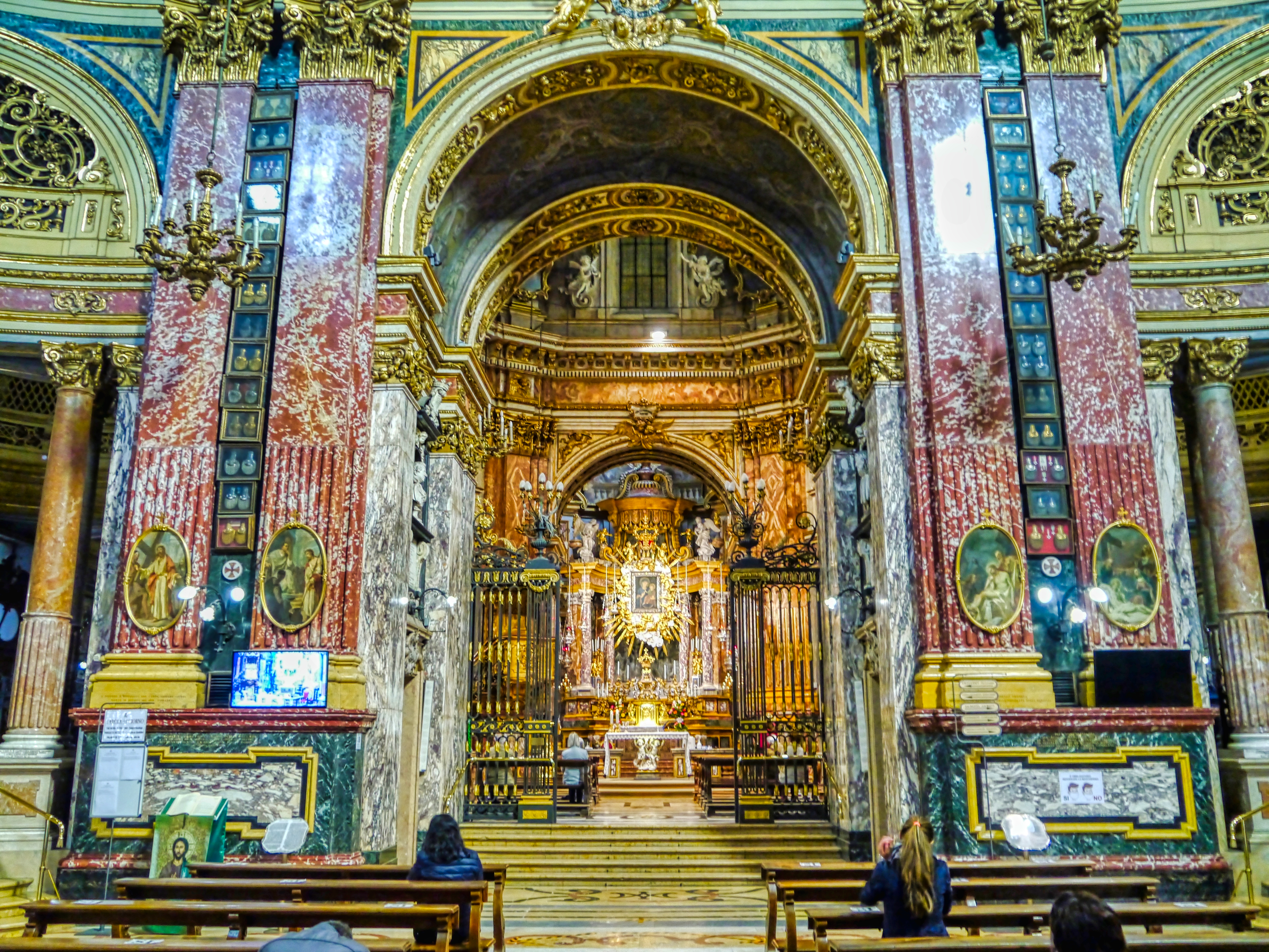
Altar with icon of the Virgin of the Consolation

According to the Chronicon Novalicense and the Chronicon of Fruttuaria, in 929 AD, Adalbert I of Ivrea ordered the construction of a monastery and endowed it with some territories. The Romanesque bell tower dates to about this time, and was built next to the foundation of one of the corner turrets of the old Roman fort which later became Turin.

Pious legends claim that on 20 June 1104, a blind Frenchman traveling pilgrim named Jean du Ravais had his vision miraculously restored by the icon during a Marian apparition of the Virgin inside the church. Inside the shrine, ex votos document centuries of miracles attributed to the Virgin.

The city of Turin named the Marian image as its local patroness and furnished a diocesan coronation for the image within the shrine on 21 May 1714.

During the reign of Duke of Savoy, Charles Felix of Sardinia, the Cistercian Oblates dedicated to the Marian icon of this title crowned the image on their own accord on 20 June 1829.

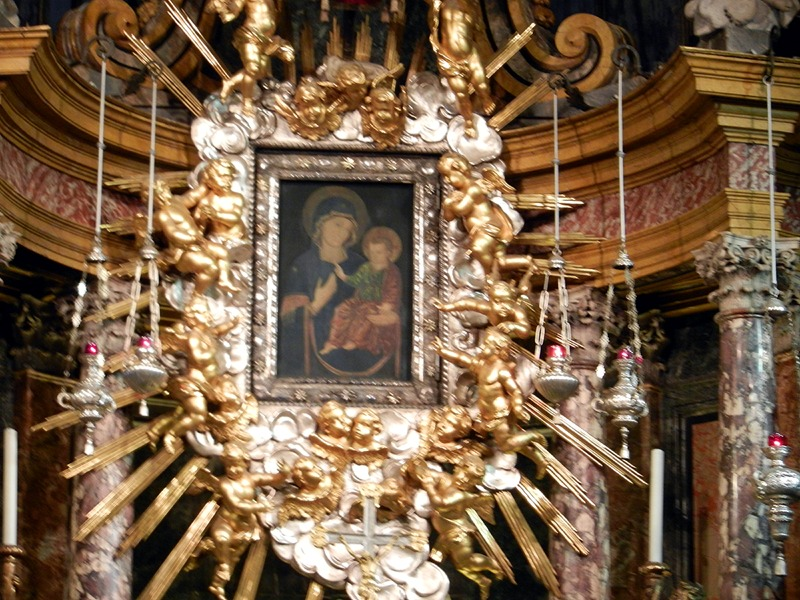
The venerated Marian icon enshrined within

The Marquise of Savona, Delfina Gavotti was a patroness of the shrine in the early turn of 20th century, having appeared in the list of patrons of the shrine literature Missioni Consolata published in August 1901. Accordingly, she procured the Bambino Gesu of Arenzano.

During the Second World War, the shrine was bombed by the Royal Air Force of Britain on 13 August 1943.

== Pontifical approbations ==
- Pope Pius X granted a decree of Pontifical coronation towards the image on 18 June 1904. Its ensemble of twenty-four stars was donated by the former Queen of Italy, Margherita of Savoy while the rest of its regalia were donated from the princes of Savoy and noble ladies of Turin. The rite of coronation was executed by the former Prefect of the Sacred Congregation of the Index, Cardinal Vincenzo Vannutelli in a public religious event on 20 June 1904. Six Cardinals attended the rite of coronation, including Cardinal Giulio Boschi (Ferrara), Giuseppe Callegari (Padua), Alfonso Capecelatro (Capua), Andrea Carlo Ferrari (Milan), and Domenico Svampa (Bologna).
  - issued a Pontifical decree which raised the shrine to the status of Minor Basilica on 7 April 1906, coinciding with the 200th anniversary of the Siege of Turin (1706).
  - issued the decree Virginis a Consolatione Templum for this shrine which approved the Archconfraternity of that devotion on 25 July 1912.
- Pope John Paul II visited the shrine on 13 April 1980.
- Pope Francis visited the shrine and on its feast day, gifted the Golden Rose on the occasion of its historical relationship with the Holy Shroud of Turin on 20 June 2015. The shrine is notable for having many devout Gay Catholics with a specialized ministry, of which Pope Francis advocated with a special campaign on Christian charity as Turin is also widely known to be an LGBT-friendly tourist city in Italy.

== Architecture ==
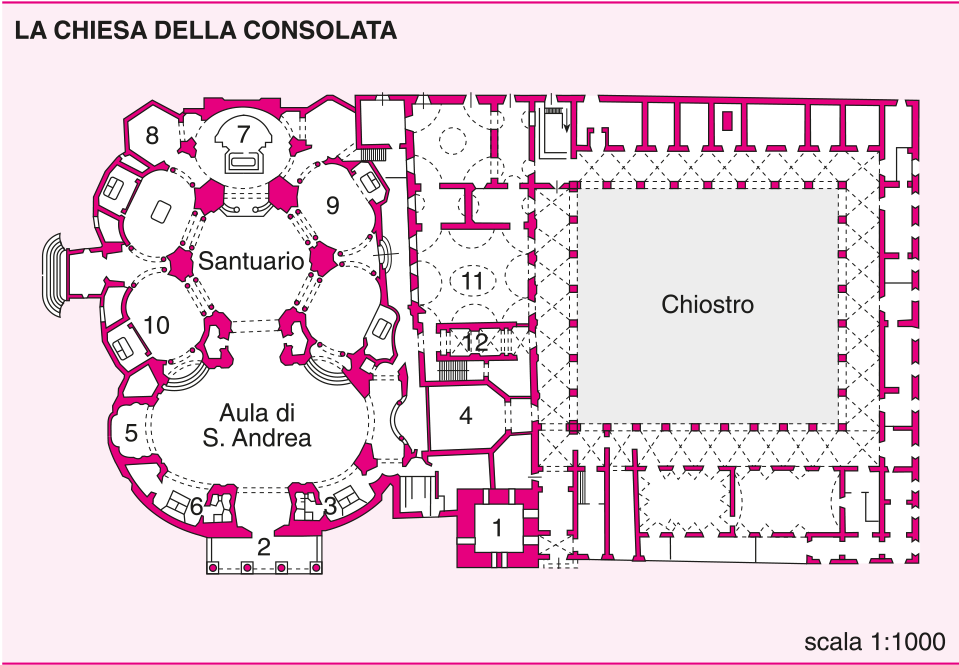
Plan

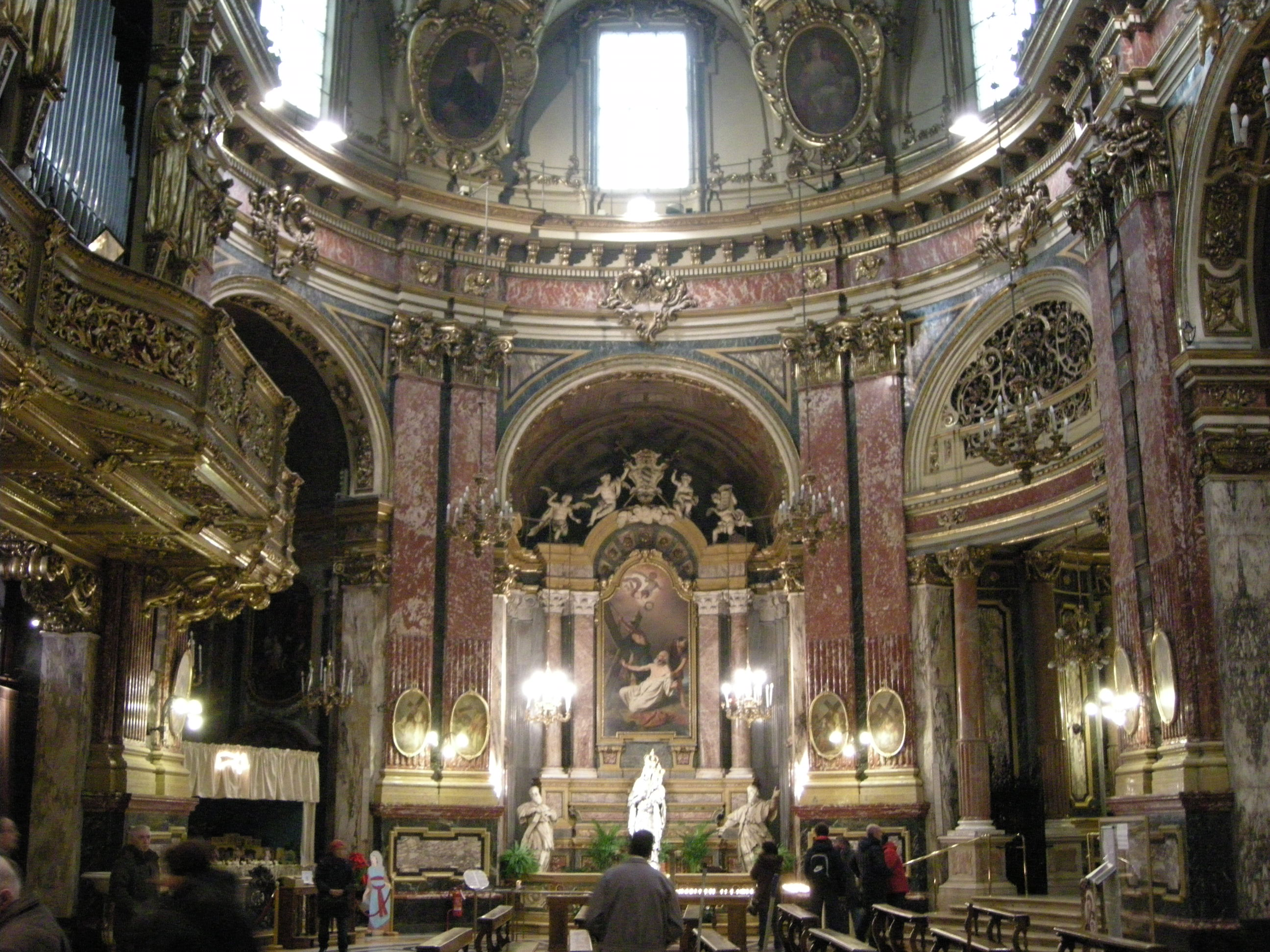
East–west axis of main altar

The church was originally built in the style of a basilica. Over the years the church and the icon of Our Lady of Consolation were rebuilt respectively restored by various religious orders. In 1448 the prior of Sant'Andrea expanded the church building one bay to the west. With the increased popularity of devotion to Our Lady of Consolation, the church changed from a parish to a shrine.

The first major reconstruction leading to the present church was commissioned in 1678 by Marie Jeanne Baptiste of Savoy-Nemours. Architect Guarino Guarini and engineer Antonio Bertola created the elliptical shape of the church nave, and added a new hexagonal chapel on the north side to accommodate the venerated icon of Mary.

The architect Filippo Juvarra in 1729—1740 added the North presbytery, thus creating a church with two apparent axis: a main altar on the east, while retaining the famed icon as a chapel to the north. This period also saw the decoration of the dome by Giovanni Battista Crosato.

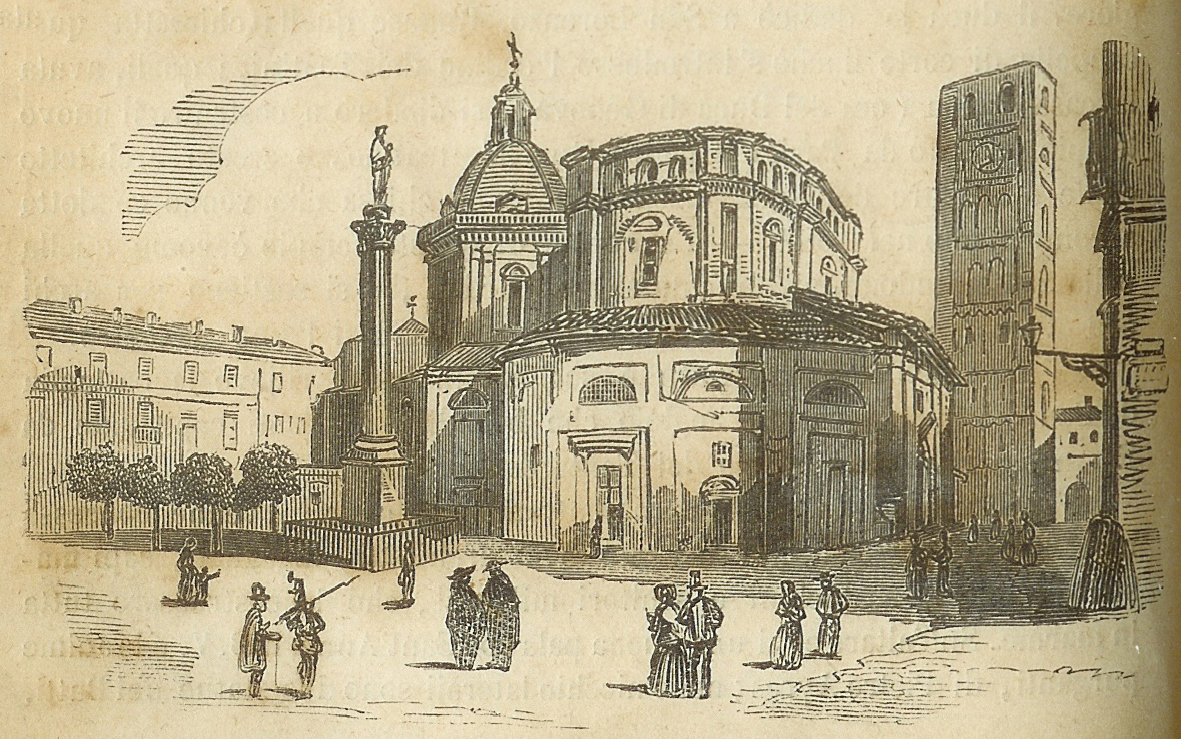
1852 engraving of La Consolata

The neoclassical facade, portico, and burial crypt on the south–north axis date from 1845 to 1860 with contributions by Pietro Anselmetti; further additions were made in 1899—1904 under the guidance of Carlo Ceppi.

The interior has a jubilantly polychrome rococo decoration with colored marbles and solomonic columns. The Juvarra altar has two marble angels in adoration by Carlo Antonio Tantardini. The interior has a sculpture of two praying queens by Vincenzo Vela. Outside the church is a statue of a virgin and child on a column.

The church serves as a burial place for a number of saints affiliated with Turin: Giuseppe Cafasso and Leonardo Murialdo, as well as the Blessed Giuseppe Allamano, rector (1880–1926) and founder of the Mission Institute of the Consolata. Every June 20, a procession of the icon of the Virgin takes place in the streets of the city.

The church is an eclectic collection of architecture, and includes portions of an ancient Roman wall, a Romanesque bell-tower, a baroque set of domes, almost Byzantine, sheltering a gothic icon, with two porticos, one of which has Neoclassic severity. The clashing of Guarini's and Juvarra's often mathematical architecture with the highly decorated interior, stubbornly magnetic to a ritualistic popular piety, leads to a modern synthesis with immanent overtones.
