= Pontifical Missionary Union =

The Pontifical Missionary Union (PMU) is a Catholic missionary society founded by blessed Paolo Manna in 1916, a missionary who served in Myanmar. Its aim is to increase awareness of the Church's worldwide mission among people engaged in pastoral ministry. It is one of the four Pontifical Mission Societies of the Roman Catholic Church. Originally known as the Missionary Union of Priests and Religious, it is a spiritual apostolate: its purpose is to educate and inform priests, religious men and women, pastoral leaders and those responsible for catechesis and religious education, so that they may better inspire others to share their faith and to be missionaries themselves.

== Background ==
In early nineteenth century France, Pauline Jaricot founded the Society for the Propagation of the Faith to provide financial support to the Churches foreign missions. Collecting a sous (about a penny) at a time, two thirds of its first collection in 1822 went to support the diocese of Louisiana, which extended from the Florida Keys to Canada. The remaining third went to China. In 2008, the Church in the United States marked the 100th anniversary of no longer being considered “mission territory” dependent on financial help from the Congregation for the Evangelization of Peoples.

In 1839 Charles de Forbin-Janson, Bishop of Nancy in France, toured the United States, visiting New Orleans, Baltimore, New York and Canada. Upon his return to France, in 1843, he established the Association of the Holy Childhood appealing to the children of France to reach out to help the children of the American Missions and China.

In 1889, Jeanne Bigard founded the Society of St. Peter the Apostle for the training of local clergy and religious in mission dioceses.

== History ==
Paolo Manna was born in 1872 in Avellino, Italy. In 1891, he entered the Theology Seminary of the Institute for Foreign Missions in Milan, and on May 19, 1894 he was ordained a priest. In 1895, he was sent to in Burma (Myanmar), where he worked until 1907, when, suffering from tuberculosis, he was forced to return home to Italy. He spent the rest of his life promoting the work of the missions, relaunching in Italy the Mission Societies for the Propagation of the Faith and Holy Childhood and promoting other initiatives for missionary cooperation.

In 1916, Father Manna established the Missionary Union of Priests and Religious to promote awareness of the missions. The Union spread rapidly after Pope Benedict XV, in his 1919 encyclical Maximum Illud, recommended its presence in every diocese.

The society was granted the title of "Pontifical" by Pope Pius XII on 28 October 1956.

== The Missionary Union today ==
The Missionary Union has an international secretariat.

In the United States the work of the various mission societies is coordinated by the Pontifical Mission Societies in the United States, headquartered in Manhattan, with representation in each diocese appointed by the bishop. Similar Pontifical Mission Societies exist in 120 countries. In many countries, the success of the three other missionary societies is linked to the vitality of the Missionary Union.

== See also ==
- Society for the Propagation of the Faith
- Association of the Holy Childhood
- Society of St. Peter the Apostle
