= Piergiuseppe =

Piergiuseppe is a masculine Italian given name. Notable people with the name include:

- Piergiuseppe Maritato (born 1989), Italian footballer
- Piergiuseppe Vacchelli (born 1937), Italian Roman Catholic titular archbishop
