= Eugenio Reffo =

Italian Catholic priest

Venerable Eugenio Reffo CSI

Priest
- Born: 2 January 1843; Turin, Kingdom of Sardinia
- Died: 9 May 1925 (aged 82); Artigianelli College, Turin, Kingdom of Italy
- Venerated in: Roman Catholic Church
- Attributes: Priest's cassock
- Patronage: Congregation of Saint Joseph

Eugenio Reffo, CSI (2 January 1843 – 9 May 1925) was an Italian Catholic priest and the co-founder for the Congregation of Saint Joseph.

Reffo taught before becoming a priest and collaborated for most of his life with religious newspapers in Turin before collaborating with Leonardo Murialdo in the founding of a religious congregation. He went blind in his last two decades but would continue to dictate his articles until his death. He also was responsible for administration and expansion for the order and during his time helped expand the order on an international level.

The process for his prospective beatification opened in the late 1970s after the Murialdines decided to launch his cause and he became titled as a Servant of God. It made its next major stride in mid-2014 after Pope Francis confirmed his heroic virtue and titled the late priest as Venerable.

== Life ==
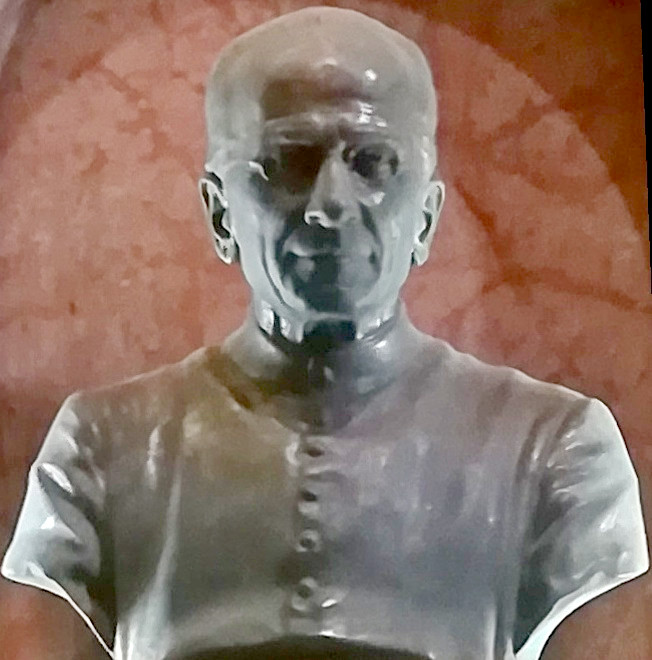

Eugenio Reffo was born in Turin on 2 January 1843 as the last of five children to Pietro Reffo and Carolina Piana. He had two brothers and two sisters who were all his seniors. His eldest brother Enrico (1831-1917) became a painter while Ermanno died aged 42 and in his life collaborated with the Vincentian Conference. His sister Ildegarde entered the Merici Sisters as a professed religious and his last sister was Adila. Reffo was baptized just hours after he was born in the metropolitan cathedral as "Eugenio Giuseppe".

He first studied under the De La Salle Brothers in Turin. From May 1855 until its closure in 1859 he studied as a student at a Jesuit-run boarding school in Massa in Modena; its closure forced him to return to Turin where he did private philosophical studies until 1861. Reffo graduated and then from 2 November 1861 began teaching students though later set his sights on entering the priesthood which forced him to stop teaching so he could commence his ecclesial studies. He did his theological studies until he was ordained to the priesthood on 26 May 1866. In 1867 he travelled to Rome and then in Naples met Ludovico da Casoria. Following his ordination in 1869 he started to collaborate and write articles for the religious newspaper L'Unità Cattolica until 1892 when it moved to Florence; he began working with another newspaper until his death. In summer 1872 he travelled to France where he stopped in Paris and met with religious brothers to understand their experiences and to learn about religious communities. Reffo later met Leonardo Murialdo at some stage and the two co-founded the Congregation of Saint Joseph - or Murialdines - on 19 March 1873. It was on that date that Reffo and four others joined the order and made their initial religious vows. He and three others would later make their solemn religious profession on 19 September 1891. In 1892 he developed a severe illness but recovered; this led his brother Enrico to paint an image of Saint Joseph in thanksgiving for his brother recovering.

Reffo began to develop retinal problems on 2 April 1895 which saw him start to lose his sight in his right eye. He had an operation in the hopes of treating it though some months after went blind in that eye. In 1900 he was elected as Superior General (following the death of Murialdo) but he did not accept the position (Giulio Costantino was elected instead) and instead was made the order's vicar general. Reffo became Superior General after Costantino later on 26 March 1912 and his term ended in 1919 after he went blind in his left eye in 1917 which saw him unable to manage his duties. He continued to dictate articles for the newspaper he collaborated with following his going blind and would do this until his death just under a decade later. In 1917 he allowed Giovanni Schiavo to be admitted into the order; Schiavo would later work in the missions for the order in Brazil. In 1903 he wrote a biographical account of Murialdo and a novena to Saint Joseph for the order. In 1903 he met Pope Pius X in a private audience and the pope encouraged his work.

He died in mid-1925 in the Artigianelli College in Turin; his remains were exhumed and relocated in 1965 to the Santuario di Nostra Signora della Salute in Turin.

== Beatification process ==
The beatification process opened in the Turin archdiocese in 1971 despite the fact that the Congregation for the Causes of Saints did not title Reffo as a Servant of God and launch the cause until 24 February 1979 when it issued the official "nihil obstat" edict (no objections to the cause). The process ended in 1981 and moved to Rome where the C.C.S. validated the process on 10 February 1995 before receiving the Positio dossier a decade later in 2006 for evaluation.

Historians assessed and approved the cause on 24 October 2006 while nine theologians also issued their approval on 12 June 2012. The C.C.S. cardinal and bishop members later met and approved the cause on 3 June 2014. Reffo became titled as Venerable on 12 June 2014 after Pope Francis signed a decree acknowledging that Reffo had lived a life of heroic virtue.

The current postulator for this cause is the Murialdine priest Orides Ballardin.
