= Hermann Heuvers =

President of Sophia University, Tokyo, and priest (1890–1977)

Fr. Hermann Heuvers SJ
- Second President of Sophia University
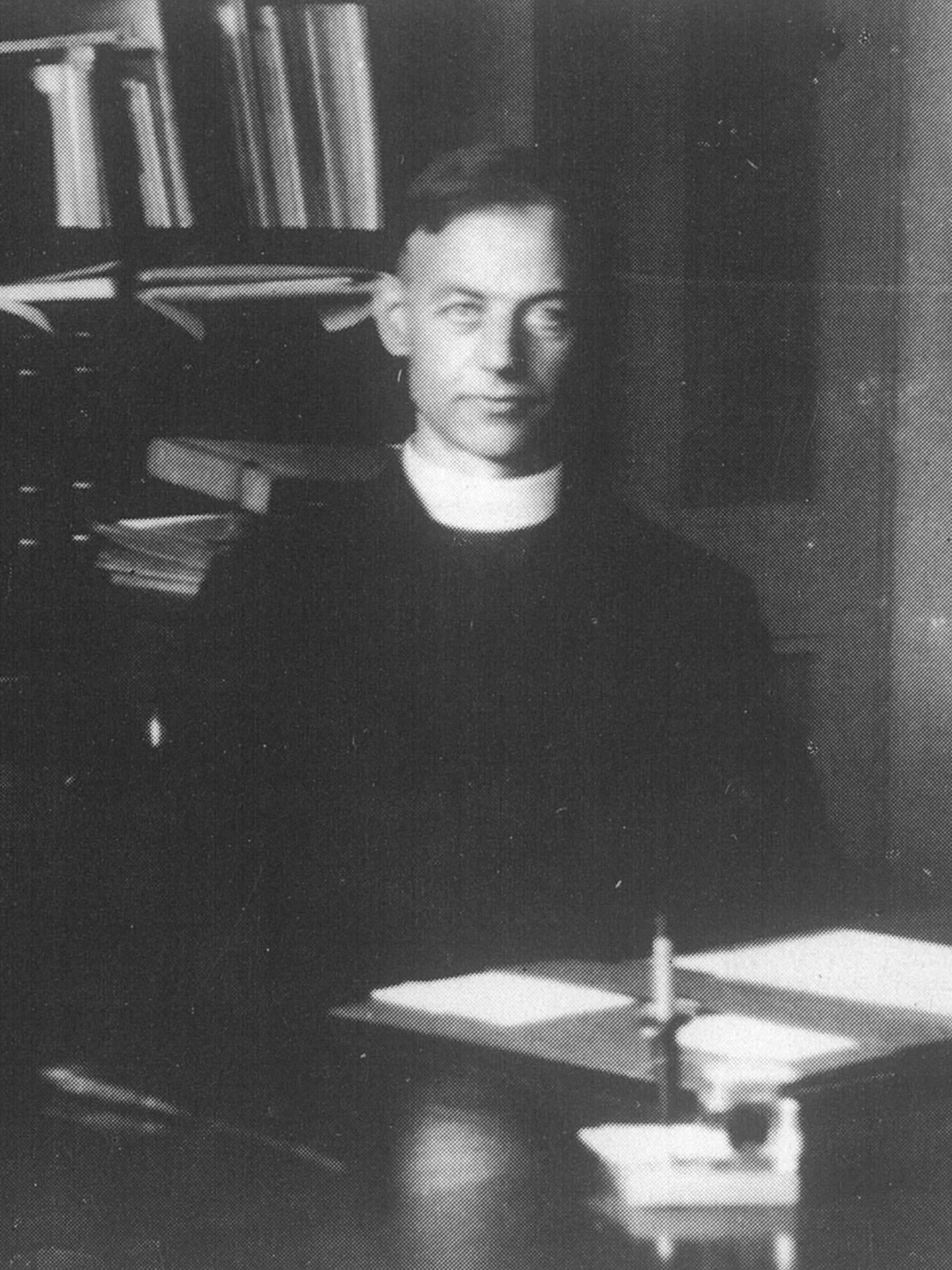
- Installed: 1937
- Term ended: 1941

Orders
- Ordination: 24 August 1920

Personal details
- Born: 31 August 1890 Dreierwalde, Germany
- Died: 9 June 1977 (aged 86) Tokyo, Japan
- Denomination: Catholic Church
- Education: Stonyhurst College

Hermann Heuvers (31 August 1890 – 9 June 1977) was a German Jesuit missionary, philosopher, educator, author, playwright, and screenwriter. He came to Japan in 1923 and served as the second president of Sophia University from 1937 to 1941.

== Biography ==
Hermann Heuvers was born in 1890.

Arriving in Japan in 1923 as a Jesuit missionary, Heuvers served as the second president of Sophia University, a Catholic university in Tokyo. Writing to Woodstock Letters in 1928 on Catholic missionary work in Japan, he said "We must first make the Catholic Church known in Japan and to bring this about it is enough to appear in public. As experience has shown this is done most advantageously with the background of a school." The Jesuit missionaries reported that many of the Japanese students at Sophia University expressed interest in the Catholic faith and the missionaries would slowly broach the topic with them by indirectly referencing religion through descriptions of past trips or by showing pictures of Rome. It was common for students to request private catechetical instruction, and in early 1931 Heuvers reported "many" such students were under his instruction. Heuvers was elected Sophia University president and chancellor in 1937 and served as president until 1941.

In October 1943, Heuvers baptized Shigeto Oshida, who would later go on to establish a hermitage called Takamori Sōan (Japanese: 高森草庵) in Fujimi Township, Nagano Prefecture.

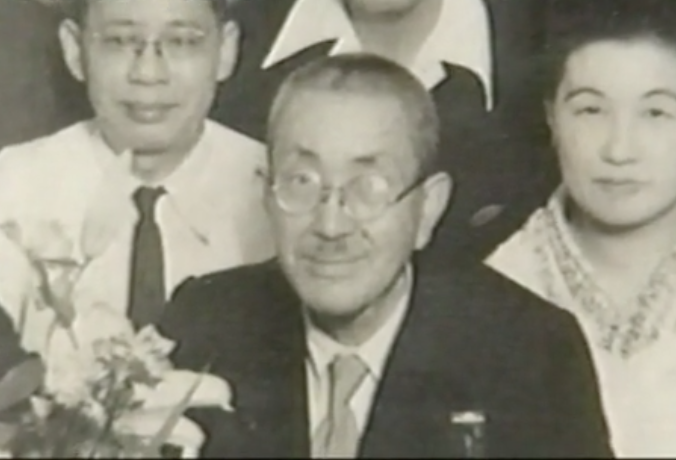
Shirō Ishii (center) pictured at a post-World War II reunion of Unit 731 members. Ishii was baptized by Heuvers.

Heuvers was a friend of surgeon general and Unit 731 war criminal Shirō Ishii, whom Heuvers would baptize on his deathbed in 1959. They became close before the war, as Ishii respected the German people and culture. Ishii had confirmed his suspicions of throat cancer by asking a former subordinate in Tokyo to examine a tissue sample without saying who the tissue had come from. After losing his voice following surgical treatment, Ishii communicated through written messages including one to a former professor that read "it's all over now". Ishii took the name Joseph upon baptism and felt relief through the rite.

Heuvers later served as the pastor of St. Ignatius Church from 1949 to 1966 and died as its honorary pastor.

Heuvers wrote poetry and several plays in Japanese. Among these were Hosokawa Gracia Fujin (English: Lady Gracia Hosokawa)–which was rewritten as a kabuki drama and performed both in Japan and in Europe–and the Noh-style Resurrection of Christ. Hosokawa Gracia Fujin, first performed in 1940, was one of two plays on Hosokawa Gracia written in mid-20th-century Japan. Heuver's depiction of Garcia represented her "as a person with a sense of self" and Christian, but also "as an obedient wife".

Heuvers died of a heart attack in Tokyo on 9 June 1977, at age 86.

== Bibliography ==
- Der Buddhismus und seine religiöse Bedeutung für unsere Zeit, Xaverius-Verlagsbuchhandlung, Aachen, 1921, pp. 53.
- The 26 Martyrs of Japan (1931)
- Hosokawa Gracia Fujin
- The Resurrection of Christ (1957)
- Gratia Hosokawa in Mitono. Monumenta Nipponica, Studies in Japanese Culture, Sophia University, 1938, Vol. I, No. 1, pp. 272–77.
- Kaiser Meiji als Dichter. Monumenta Nipponica, Studies in Japanese Culture, Sophia University, Tokyo, 1939, Vol. II, No. 2, pp. 333–48.
