= Shigeto Oshida =

Japanese Dominican priest and Zen Buddhist monk

Father Shigeto Oshida
- 押田 成人
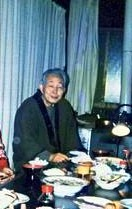
- Shigeto Oshida at his hermitage, Takamori Soan (高森草庵), in 1994
- Born: January 15, 1922; Namamugi, Yokohama
- Died: November 6, 2003 (aged 81); Fujimi, Nagano
- Other names: Shigeto Vincent Oshida; Vincent Oshida
- Education: University of Tokyo (1951)
- Occupations: Dominican priest, Zen Buddhist monk, writer, mystic
- Known for: Buddhist-Christian dialogue
- Religion: Roman Catholic Christianity, Zen Buddhism
- Church: Roman Catholic Church
- Ordained: 8 April 1961

Father Shigeto Vincent Oshida (Japanese: 押田 成人; January 15, 1922 – November 6, 2003) was a Japanese Dominican priest, Zen Buddhist monk, writer, and mystic. Noted for simultaneously being a Dominican friar and Zen Buddhist master, Oshida was known for engaging in interfaith dialogue throughout his life.

== Biography ==
Shigeto Oshida was born on January 15, 1922, in Namamugi, Yokohama. He was born as the youngest of six children and moved to Shibuya, Tokyo shortly after his birth.

In 1942, Oshida graduated from Dai-ichi Kotō Gakkō (第一高等学校), a two-year preparatory college that was dissolved after World War II. In 1943, he met German Jesuit priest Hermann Heuvers, who became his spiritual mentor. Oshida was baptized in October 1943 and was then drafted into the Japanese Imperial Army in December of that year. After World War II, he attended the University of Tokyo, where he studied philosophy and graduated in 1951. He entered the Order of Preachers (OP), becoming a Dominican friar.

He enrolled at the Dominican Theological Seminary in Ottawa, Canada in 1958 and was ordained a priest on 8 April 1961. Throughout the 1950s and 1960s, he suffered from lung disease and was frequently hospitalized; part of his right lung was removed in 1963.

In 1964, he founded a hermitage called Takamori Sōan (Japanese: 高森草庵) in Fujimi Township, Nagano Prefecture in the Japanese Alps. The hermitage consisted of a small community of Christians and Zen Buddhists. From then on, he traveled throughout the world to promote peace and interfaith dialogue. Among his travels, Oshida visited Thailand, India, Bangladesh, Vietnam, Hong Kong, Taiwan, South Korea, Philippines, Saipan, Poland, Lebanon, Israel, Canada, and the United States.

On November 6, 2003, Oshida died in Fujimi at the age of 81.

== Writings ==
The following bibliography of writings by Oshida is primarily sourced from Miller (2023).

=== Anthologies ===
- Selected Works of Shigeto Oshida, vol. 1: Encounter with the Depths / 押田成人著作選集1：深みとのめぐりあい (2020) (ISBN 9784818410534)
- Selected Works of Shigeto Oshida, vol. 2: Interacting with the Mystical Traditions of the World / 押田成人著作選集2：世界の神秘伝承との交わり (2020) (ISBN 9784818410541)
- Selected Works of Shigeto Oshida, vol. 3: The Resonance of the Current of Life – The spirituality of the Sub-Current / 押田成人著作選集3：いのちの流れのひびきあい 地下流の霊性 (2020) (ISBN 9784818410558)

=== English writings and lectures ===
- "Evangelization and Inculturation." Manuscript. 10 pages.
- "Evangelization and Inculturation" and "Zen: The Mystery of the Word and Reality." Japan Missionary Bulletin 45 (1991): 153–59. Reprint: Monastic Interreligious Dialogue Bulletin, ed. Mark Delery, OCSO. Vol. 75 (October 2005).
- "The Good News from Sinanosakai," 1965. Unpublished manuscript. (Oshida wrote in Japanese. English translation made after his death.)
- "I Shall Meet You in Galilee." In The Dominican Way, edited by Lucette Verboven, 189–200. London and New York: Continuum, 2011.
- "A Little Note for the Assembly: Word-Idea Word-Event." "September Meeting," Takamori International Conference, September 23–30, 1981. Takamori Soan, Japan.
- "Message to the Assembly of Auschwitz." Fr. Shigeto Oshida. Interfaith Pilgrimage for Peace and Life. Newsletter. Vol. 1 (1995). (accessed November 5, 2022).
- "The Mystery of the Word and the Reality." In Toward a New Age in Mission: The Good News of God’s Kingdom; To The Peoples of Asia, 208–16. International Congress on Mission (IMC). Manila, December 2–7, 1979. Vol. 2, book 3. Manila: Theological Conference Office, 1981.
- "What Is Faith?" Unpublished manuscript. No date. 10 pages.
- White Deer. Woodcuts by Joseph Domjan [József Domján]. Poems by Shigeto Oshida. Tokyo, Japan: The Board of Publications, The United Church of Christ in Japan, 2015.
- "Zenna." Manuscript article for the International Mission Congress, Manila, Philippines. December 2–6, 1979.

=== Japanese writings ===
- Ai no Mizu 「藍の水」 (Indigo Water). Kyoto: Shisōan Veritas, 1977.
- Bara no Madoi 「ばらのまどい」 (A Gathering of Roses). Kyoto: Shisōan Veritas, 1965.
- Harami to Oto 「孕みと音」 (Conception and Sound). Kyoto: Shisōan Veritas, 1976.
- Hitori no Wakamono no Miteita Koto 「一人の若者の観ていたコト」 (What One Young Man Saw—St. Mark's Gospel). Translated by Shigeto Oshida Sr. Maria Kawasumi, and Hiroshige Watanabe. Kyoto: Shisōan Veritas, 2008.
- Inori no Sugata-ni Mu no Kaze-ga Fuku 「祈りの姿に無の風が吹く」 (A Figure Praying Amidst the Wind of Nothing, "Nothingness" or "Emptiness"). Tokyo: Chiyūsha, 1985.
- Ishi no Kohogi no Sho 押田成人訳、ルカ福音 「医師のことほぎの書」 (A Book of Praise by a Medical Doctor—St. Luke's Gospel). Translated by Sr. Maria Kawasumi and Fr. Hiroshige Watanabe. Nagano: Shisōan, 2013.
- "Kugatsu Kaigi"—Sekai Seishin Shidoosha, Kinkyuu no Tsudoi ("The September Conference"—The Emergency Meeting of the Spiritual Leaders of the World). Kyoto: Shisōan Veritas, 1981.
- Michi Sugara 「道すがら」 (Along the Way). Kyoto: Shisōan Veritas, 1969.
- Ryooshi no Kokuhaku—Sei Yohane Fukuinsho, 私家版『漁師の告白聖ヨハネ福音書』 (Confession of a Fisherman—St. John's Gospel). Handwritten translation printed on silk screen. Private publication, 2000.
- Ryooshi no Kokuhaku 「漁師の告白」 (Confession of a Fisherman). Kyoto: Shisōan Veritas, 2003.
- Shiroi Shika 「白い鹿」 (The White Deer). Coauthored with József Domján. Kyoto: Shisōan Veritas, 1981.
- Tooi Manazashi 「遠いまなざし」 (A Far Away Look). Tokyo: Chiyūsha, 1983. ISBN 9784885030031.
- Zeiri no Satori to Nagame 「税吏の悟りとながめ」 (Satori—What A Tax Collector Saw—a Tax Collector's Awakening. St. Matthew's Gospel). Translated by Sr. Maria Kawasumi and Hiroshige Watanabe. Kyoto: Shisōan Veritas, 2010.
