= The 26 Martyrs of Japan (film) =

Japanese film on Catholic priests

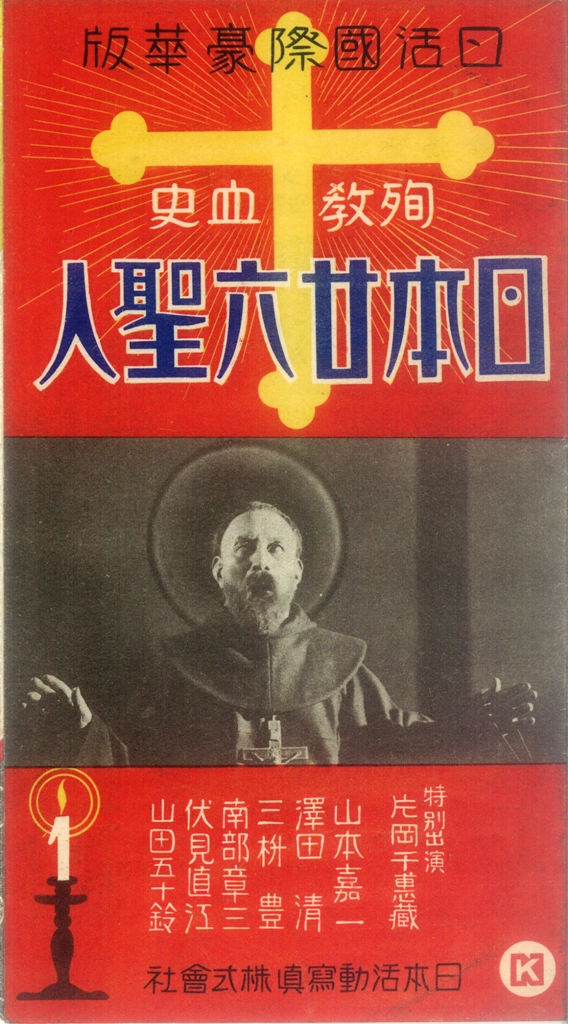
- Directed by: Tomiyasu Ikeda
- Written by: Tomiyasu Ikeda
- Screenplay by: Tomiyasu Ikeda and Hermann Heuvers
- Based on: Yamato hijiri chishio no kakioki by Aimé Villion
- Produced by: Hirayama Seiju and Hirohisa Ikenaga
- Starring: Kaichi Yamamoto, Masu Toyofushimi, Naoe Yamada, Isuzu Yamada, Chiezō Kataoka
- Production company: Nikkatsu
- Release date: 1931
- Running time: 152 minutes
- Country: Japan
- Language: Japanese
- Budget: 300,000 yen

The 26 Martyrs of Japan (Junkyō chi-shi Nihon nijūrokuseijin) is a 1931 film released in Japan based on the martyrdom of twenty-six Catholic priests and layman in 1597. This silent film was produced by Seiju Hirayama, a Catholic landowner in Japanese-occupied Korea, who invested a huge amount of his personal fortune in producing this work, which was open to the public. Although it is a commercial film, it was produced under Hirayama's initiative with the cooperation of many people involved in the Catholic Church. It was the first full-fledged narrative film produced by the Catholic Church in Japan, which was in the process of becoming independent from the leadership of foreign missionaries during this period.

== Synopsis ==
Pedro Baptista, a Spanish priest of the Franciscan order, arrives in Japan and conducts missionary work in the Kinai region, mainly in Kyoto. After the wreck of a Spanish ship, Hideyoshi Toyotomi began suppressing the church, and priests and laity are captured and executed in Nagasaki. Time passes and in 1862, about 250 years after his martyrdom, 26 of the martyrs are canonized in the Vatican.

== Reception ==
The film was generally well received by film critics and the Japanese Catholic hierarchy. Hirayama embarked on a tour of America to screen the film, despite racist opposition, stating "I performed at 117 schools in the United States, gave lectures at the same time, attended 97 churches, five Protestant churches, six times at theaters, and wrote articles in 70 newspapers and magazines. The total number of visitors was 146,740 including 2,340 priests, nuns, seminarians." It was screened in Europe as well. Hirayama considered the film to be a work of propaganda against Western misconceptions of Japan.

=== Gallery ===
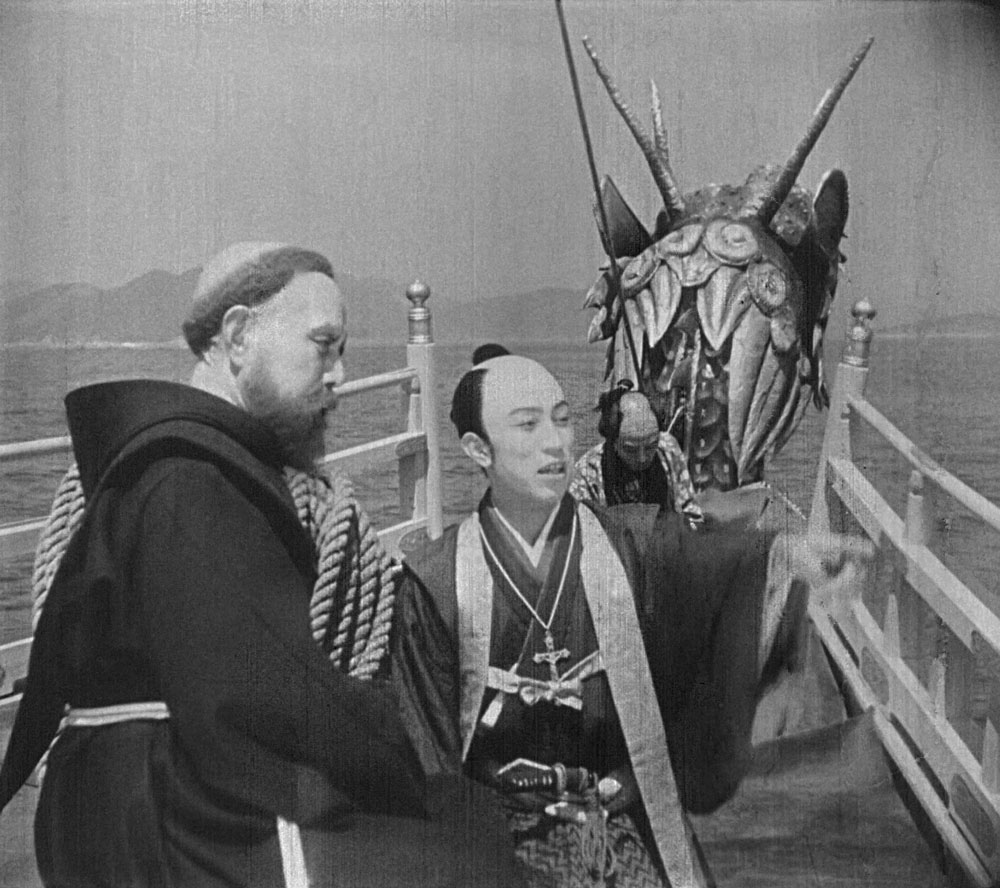

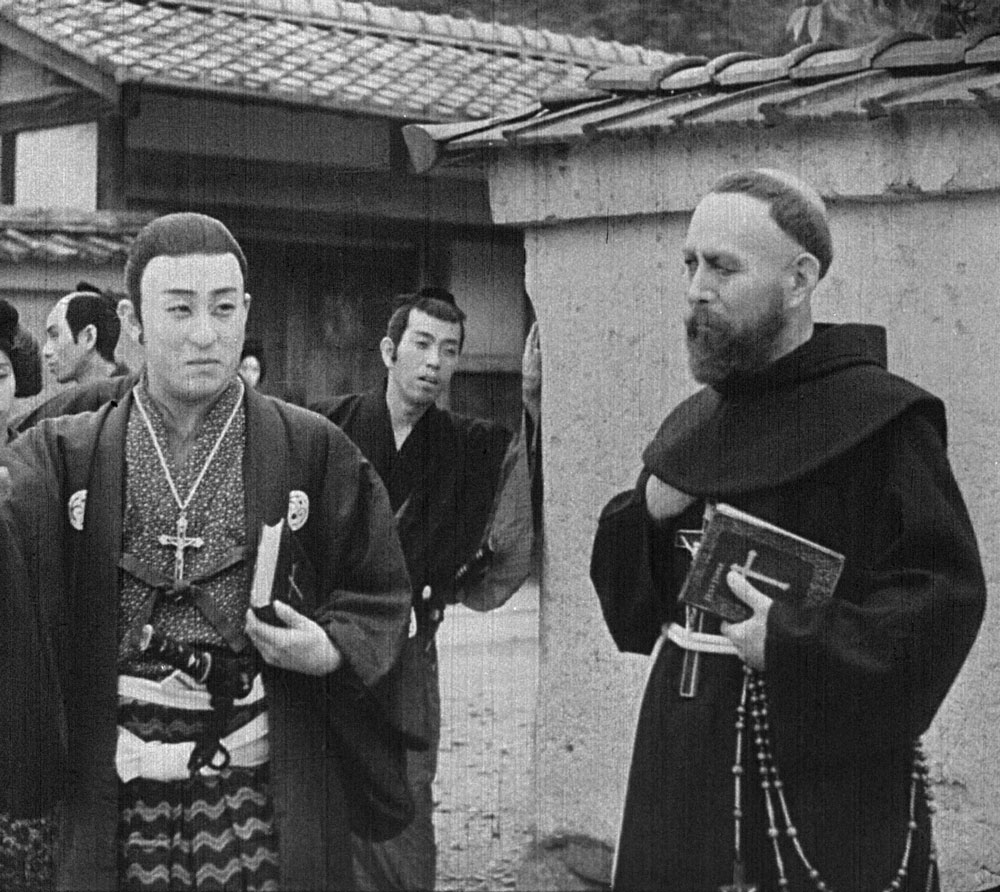

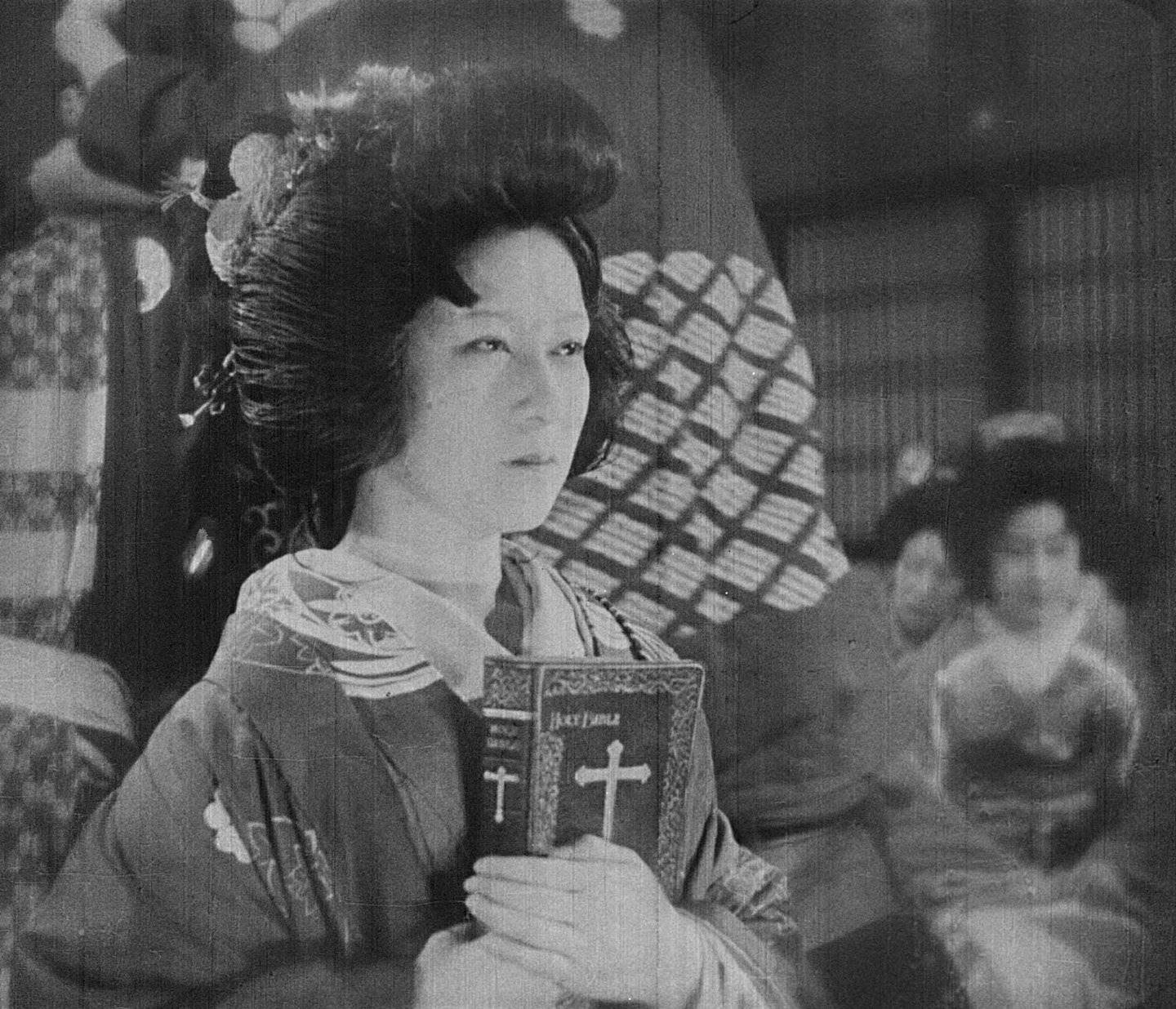
