= Paolo Manna =

Italian Catholic missionary (1872–1952)

Blessed Paolo Manna PIME
- Born: 16 January 1872; Avellino, Kingdom of Italy
- Died: 15 September 1952 (aged 80); Naples, Italy
- Venerated in: Roman Catholic Church
- Beatified: 4 November 2001 by Pope John Paul II
- Feast: 15 September
- Attributes: Priest's attire
- Patronage: Pontifical Missionary Union; Missionaries

Paolo Manna (16 January 1872 – 15 September 1952) was an Italian Roman Catholic priest and a member from the Pontifical Institute for Foreign Missions as well as the founder of the Pontifical Missionary Union. Manna worked in the missions in Burma and even served as the Superior General for PIME. Manna did much in his life to promote the missions and the evangelic and apostolic zeal that accompanied it and he established newspapers and movements to help promote this charismatic apostolate. He also held several leadership positions in PIME and used that standing in order to further engage with prospective missionaries.

Manna's beatification cause started on 23 August 1973 under Pope Paul VI in which he was titled as a Servant of God while Pope John Paul II both named him as Venerable in 1989 and beatified him in 2001.

== Life ==
Paolo Manna was born on 16 January 1872 in Avellino as the fifth of six children to Vincenzo Manna and Lorenza Ruggiero. Two uncles were priests as was an older brother; one uncle was stationed in Naples and the other was in Avellino at the church of San Stefano del Sole. His mother died in 1874. Manna was baptized in the Avellino Cathedral on 17 January and he received his Confirmation and First Communion both in 1886.

He received his initial education in Avellino and in Naples where he studied both the Latin and Greek languages. Manna underwent philosophical studies at the Gregorian college in Rome from 1889 and in 1891 entered began his theological education in Milan. Manna received his ordination to the priesthood in the Milan Duomo on 19 May 1894 from the former Archbishop of Milan Paolo Angelo Ballerini.

Manna left on 27 September 1895 for the missions at Toungoo in Burma and headed to Trieste which he left on 3 October to arrive at his destination on 26 October. He worked there until 4 July 1907 and on three separate occasions had to return to his homeland since he suffered from bouts of tuberculosis. In 1908 he became the editor of the magazine "Le Missioni Cattoliche" (the Catholic Missions) and in 1914 started publication of "Propaganda Missionaria" which became a popular broadsheet newspaper.

In 1916 he established a religious movement in order to promote and foster greater knowledge for the missions and he sought advice from Guido Maria Conforti who himself founded a similar sort of movement. This congregation spread at a rapid pace more so after Pope Benedict XV recommended its presence in all dioceses in "Maximum Illud" issued in 1919. In 1919 he founded "Italia Missionaria" for adolescents to learn and know about the missions and also founded an educational institute for seminarians in Ducenta in Caserta in an effort to foster vocations to the missions. For a decade – from 25 August 1924 until 25 October 1934 – he served as the Superior General for PIME in Milan.

In 1926 – at the instigation of Pope Pius XI – the Milanese PIME united a branch for missions in Rome to form one collective PIME movement that was more universal. From 9 November 1927 until 14 February 1929 he undertook a long trip to the missions in both Africa and the United States of America. In 1943 he established the magazine "Vegna il Tuo regno". The order he founded received the title "Pontifical" after Pope Pius XII allowed for that title to be conferred in a 1956 decree.

Manna died in Naples on 15 September 1952; his remains were interred in Ducenta after exhumation and transferral on 23 June 1961. Manna suffered ill health in 1952 and underwent an operation on 13 September but died following complications. Pope John Paul II paid a visit to the late priest's tomb on 13 December 1990.

== Beatification ==
The beatification process opened on 23 August 1973 under Pope Paul VI after the Congregation for the Causes of Saints issued the official "nihil obstat" to the cause and titled Manna as a Servant of God. Cardinal Corrado Ursi inaugurated the cognitional process in Naples on 4 May 1973 and later oversaw its successful closure in 1976; theologians approved his spiritual writings on 15 February 1980 while the C.C.S. later validated the cognitional process in 1981. The C.C.S. later received the Positio in 1985 from the postulation. Theologians approved the cause on 10 May 1988 as did the C.C.S. on 10 January 1989 while Pope John Paul II confirmed the late priest's life of heroic virtue and titled him as Venerable on 18 February 1989.

The miracle for beatification was investigated and later received C.C.S. validation on 29 September 1995. The medical board approved this on 9 March 2000 as did theologians on 27 October 2000 and the C.C.S. sometime later; John Paul II approved the healing to be a miracle and beatified Manna in Saint Peter's Square on 4 November 2001.

== Publications ==
Manna wrote a number of books and booklets. His proposals regarding work in the missions anticipated the developments at the Second Vatican Council more so the declarations "Ad Gentes" 2: 39. He spent his entire life promoting the missions while at the same time opposing all forms of cultural imperialism.

Manna published:

- Missionari autem Pauci
- The Separated Brethren (1941)
- Apostolic Virtues (1943)

== See also ==
- Pauline Jaricot
- Guido Maria Conforti
- Pontifical Missionary Union
