= Aimé Villion =

French Catholic missionary in Japan (1843–1932)

Fr. Aimé Villon MEP
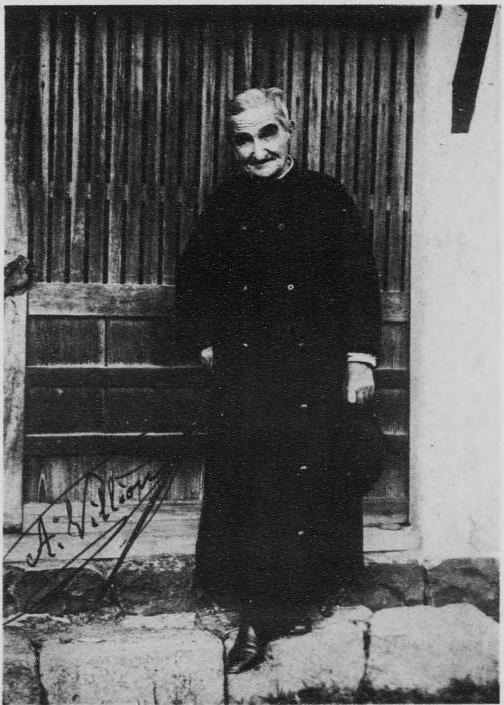
- Church: Catholic Church

Personal details
- Born: September 2, 1843 Rhône, France
- Died: April 1, 1932 (aged 88) Osaka, Osaka Prefecture, Japan

Aimé Villion (also known in Japanese as アマトス・ビリオン from Latin Amatus Villion), (September 2, 1843 – April 1, 1932) was a French missionary affiliated with the Paris Foreign Missions Society. He came to Japan in October 1868 (the first year of the Meiji era), and while conducting missionary activities in Kobe, Kyoto, Yamaguchi, Hagi, Nara, etc., he devoted himself to researching Christian historical sites and building monuments to commemorate martyrs.

== Career ==
Aimé Villion was born September 2, 1843, in Genay, a village near Rhône in southern France. His parents' house was that of a prestigious staff officer of Napoleon Bonaparte. His father served as a judge, and he had one older sister. His mother died when he was four years old and his family moved to Lyon.

After graduating from St. John Elementary School in Lyon, he studied at the seminary of Saint-Sulpice in Paris, and was ordained a priest on May 26, 1866. On June 14, 1866, he departed from the port of Marseille as an overseas missionary of the Paris Foreign Missions Society, and traveled to Hong Kong in October 1868, arriving in Nagasaki. However, due to the Meiji government's policy toward missionaries, in 1870, he was confined to Oura Catholic Church. Since then, more than 3,000 believers who had been persecuted and oppressed by the Meiji government were killed in Nagoya Kanazawa, Tsuwano.

On November 24, 1871, at the age of 34, he entered Kobe and became the second priest of Nakayamate Catholic Church. In 1875, famine occurred in the Kansai region, and children were abandoned one after another due to extreme poverty. Rumors spread that a Christian priest would take care of abandoned children, and children were abandoned in front of the church almost every day. Unable to deal with the large number of abandoned children, Villion entrusted them care of the Dames of Saint Maur (now the Sisters of the Infant Jesus) in Yokohama, and in about 10 months, 65 children died. In addition, he requested Bernard Petitjean to send nuns to Kobe, and on July 9, 1877, four sisters of the Congrégation des Soeurs de l'Enfant-Jésus de Chauffailles came to Japan.

After spending seven years in Kobe, in 1879 he was succeeded by Father August Chatron and entered Kyoto. In Kyoto, he visited Chion-in Temple to study Buddhism and opened a French language school to teach young people French. Among the students of this cram school were Eiichi Shibusawa. Around this time, he also taught at a Japanese-French school that opened next to the French legation in Tokyo, and among the students at that time were Saionji Kinmochi, and Takashi Hara. Villion made efforts to build a church in Kyoto, and on May 1, 1890, with the aid of Jeanne Bigard, founder of the Society of St. Peter the Apostle, the Saint Francis Xavier church (now Kawaramachi Church) was completed.

In February 1889, just before he purchased the construction site for the construction of the St. Francis Xavier church, and just before the construction of the church finally started, he was suddenly ordered to transfer to Yamaguchi where he was appointed pastor. During this period, he made many trips to investigate the martyrs of Hagi and Tsuwano, and six years later in November 1895, he entrusted the Yamaguchi church to another young priest and was transferred to Hagi. In Yamaguchi, Chuya Nakahara's adoptive grandfather was a believer, so he also interacted with the Nakahara family. While conducting missionary work in Hagi, he researched and researched historical sites of Christianity, and in August 1891, built a stone monument to a martyr's tomb known "Shifuku no Monument" in Tsuwano. He also discovered the ruins of Daidoji, where Francis Xavier is said to have lived.

In 1924, the Hagi Church was transferred from the Paris Foreign Missions Society to the Society of Jesus, so Villion withdrew to Kobe. In the following year, he assumed the post of pastor of the Nara Church. On October 16, 1926, a monument was erected on the site of Daido-ji Temple and an unveiling ceremony was held.

In 1932, he fell ill, hoping that he would die on the tatami mats of Kawaguchi Church He was transferred to the cathedral and died on April 1 of the same year in Osaka without ever returning to his hometown.

== See also ==
- The 26 Martyrs of Japan (1931 film) - Based on "Nihon seijin senketsu isho"

== Bibliography ==
- 『偉大なるヴィリヨン神父―ヴィリヨン神父にまねびて』 山崎忠雄 著（1965年）
- 『ビリオン神父―現代日本カトリックの柱石 慶応・明治・大正・昭和史を背景に』 中央出版社 池田敏雄 著 （1965年）
- 『今、ビリオン神父を追う―幕末から昭和まで (Siesta Books)』 アガリ総合研究所 ホセ・パラシオス 著（2003年）ISBN 978-4901151108
- 『人物による日本カトリック教会史-聖職者および信徒-75名伝』中央出版社 池田敏雄 著（1968年）
- 『来日西洋人事典〔増補改訂普及版〕』日外アソシエーツ 武内 博 著（1995年）
- 『無償の愛に生きて―130年前のシスターの挑戦』 講談社 村田初子 著（2010年）
