= Pontifical Mission Societies =

Group of Catholic missionary societies

The Pontifical Mission Societies
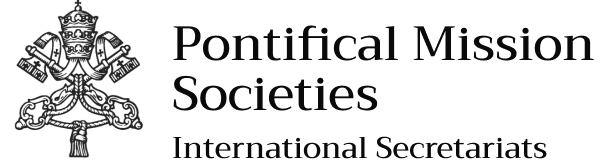

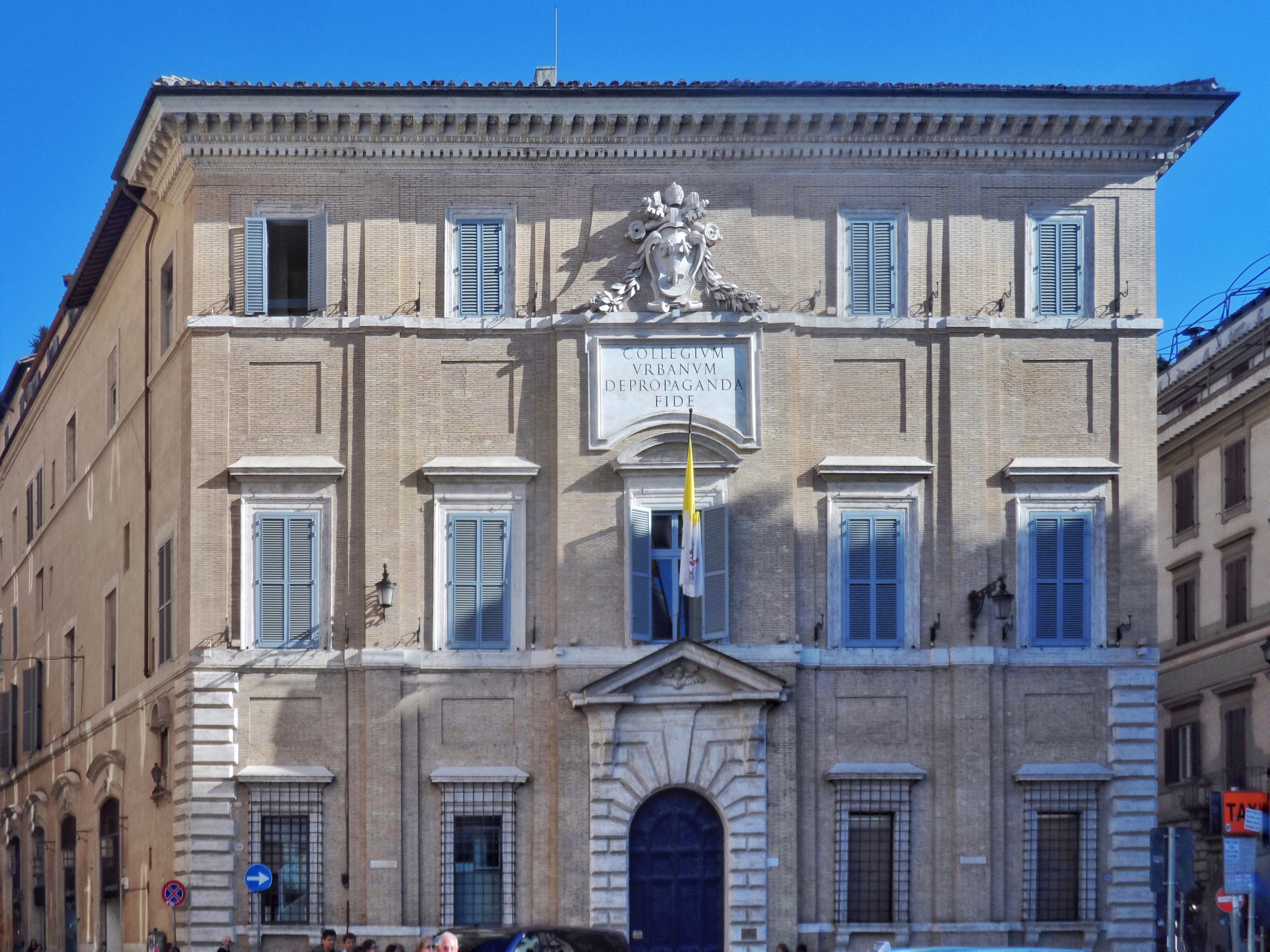
- Palazzo di Propaganda Fide, seat of the Congregation for the Evangelization of Peoples

Agency overview
- Formed: 1922; 104 years ago
- Superseding agency: Dicastery for Evangelization
- Jurisdiction: Catholic Church
- Headquarters: Palazzo di Propaganda Fide, Rome
- Agency executives: 1. Franciscus, Supreme Pontiff; 2. Archbishop-elect Emilio Nappa, President; 3. Luis Antonio Gokim Cardinal Tagle, Prefect of the Congregation for the Evangelization of Peoples
- Website: https://www.ppoomm.va/en.html

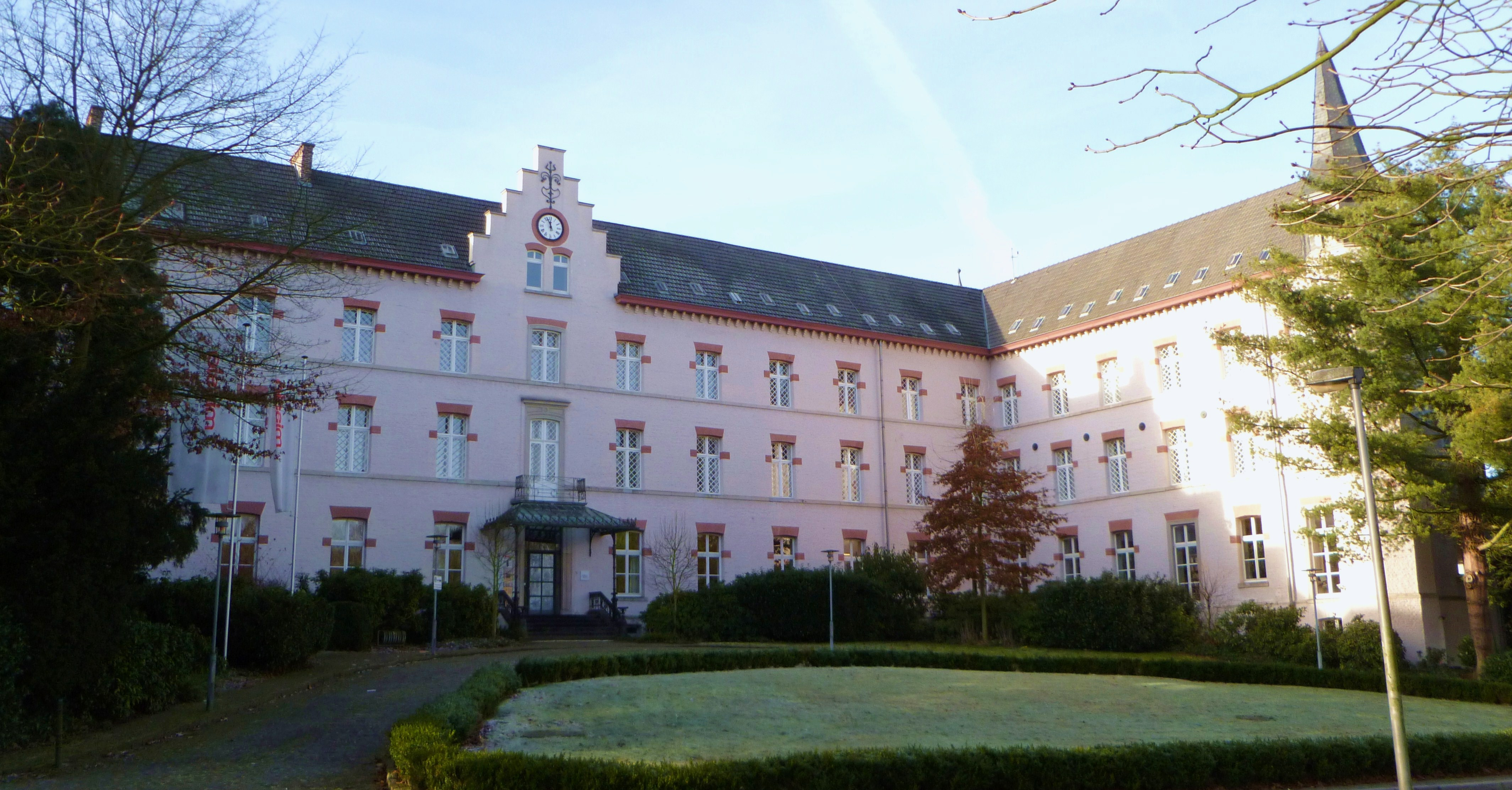
Missio building, Aachen

The Pontifical Mission Societies (TPMS), known in some countries as Missio, are a group of Catholic missionary societies which operate under the jurisdiction of the Pope. These organizations include the Society for the Propagation of the Faith, the Society of St. Peter the Apostle, the Holy Childhood Association and the Missionary Union of Priests and Religious.

These four societies each received the title "pontifical" in 1922 to indicate their status as official instruments of the pope and of the universal Catholic Church. In most countries, the national director of the Pontifical Mission Societies heads the four societies, as is the case in the United States, and oversees the World Mission Sunday Collection, which is taken up on the third Sunday of October each year in every Catholic parish around the globe.

== Functions ==
The Pope specifically asks the Pontifical Mission Societies to help bring the messages of Christ to the world, especially in countries where Christianity is new, young or poor. The societies care for and support the younger churches until they are able to be self-sufficient. The Pontifical Mission Societies have, as their primary purpose, the promotion of a universal missionary spirit - a spirit of prayer and sacrifice - among all baptized Catholics. The first three Societies, in carrying out that goal, invite baptized Catholics to express their missionary commitment by offering their prayers, personal sacrifices and financial support for the work of the Church in the Missions. The Missionary Union of Priests and Religious works to deepen mission awareness among priests, men and women Religious, catechists and educators so that they are fully prepared to take on the mission formation of the faithful.

"The Pontifical Mission Societies" raise awareness and foster prayer and cooperation in the whole Catholic Church, with 120 offices worldwide. It is the only organization which supports every one of the 1,200 mission dioceses of the world. "The Pontifical Mission Societies" exist through the generosity of Catholics and plays a crucial role in combating poverty, disease, injustice and exploitation.

The election of Pope Leo XIV in 2025 brought renewed attention to the Church’s missionary mandate and affirmed the centrality of the Pontifical Mission Societies in carrying it out. A former missionary bishop in Peru, the Holy Father spoke in his inaugural Urbi et Orbi address of the Church’s need to be “a missionary Church, a Church that builds bridges and encourages dialogue,” a vision rooted in his pastoral experience. In his first address to the General Assembly of the Pontifical Mission Societies, he described TPMS as the “primary means of awakening missionary responsibility among all the baptized,” citing their support for mission territories, education, and vocations. He emphasized the urgency of evangelization in today’s wounded world and called for a renewed spirit of “missionary discipleship” across the global Church. Highlighting the themes of communion and universality, Pope Leo encouraged TPMS to help all Catholics see beyond their local contexts and embrace the Church’s mission to “bring to all peoples… the Gospel promise of true and lasting peace.” He affirmed the Societies' role in forming “missionaries of hope among all peoples,” aligning their global presence with the Church’s commitment to peace, dialogue, and solidarity.

On 26 June 2012, Pope Benedict XVI appointed Bishop Protase Rugambwa, who until then had been serving as bishop of the Roman Catholic Diocese of Kigoma, Tanzania, as the Deputy Secretary of the Congregation for the Evangelization of Peoples and as President of the Pontifical Mission Societies, naming him an archbishop. He succeeded Archbishop Piergiuseppe Vacchelli. Rugambwa ceased to be president after becoming Secretary of the Congregation for the Evangelization of Peoples on November 9, 2017, with Giovanni Pietro Dal Toso replacing him.

On December 2, 2022, Pope Francis appointed Italian Archbishop Emilio Nappa as adjunct secretary of the new Dicastery for Evangelization with the office of president of the Pontifical Mission Societies. Until then, the Naples-born priest had been an official of the Vatican's Secretariat for the Economy.

Since Archbishop Charles Asa Schleck's concurrent appointment as Undersecretary of the Congregation for the Evangelization of Peoples and President of the Pontifical Mission Societies, the two appointments have been concurrent (though with the title Adjunct Secretary):

- Archbishop Charles Asa Schleck (1995–2001)
- Cardinal Malcolm Ranjith (2001–2004)
- Archbishop Piergiuseppe Vacchelli (2004–2012)
- Archbishop Protase Rugambwa (2012–2017)
- Archbishop Giovanni Pietro Dal Toso (2017–2022)
- Archbishop Emilio Nappa (2022–present)

== National operations ==
=== England and Wales ===
Missio - England and Wales publishes Mission Today in Spring and Autumn each year. A children's branch called "Mission Together" also provides resources to help children engage with the missionary activities of the Catholic Church.

=== The Pontifical Mission Societies USA ===
The Pontifical Mission Societies (TPMS) in the United States work through local Bishops, churches, and missionary congregations to ensure that resources are distributed equitably and justly, based on the needs of individual Churches.

The money goes directly from the United States to the Bishops in the mission territories, allowing for a direct link between the two local Churches.

TPMS-USA is guided by a National Director and Board of episcopal and lay Catholic leaders. The Board advises on strategy, vision and direction, provides oversight on the governance of the organization, and ensures our financial sustainability. Each member of the Board is an ambassador of The Pontifical Mission Societies in their dioceses and spheres of influence.

Archbishop Fulton Sheen, now “Blessed,” was director of the Pontifical Mission Societies from 1950 – 1966. In the Fall of 1951, he began his famous television series, Life is Worth Living. The rich content and dramatic presentation of his one-man television program soon attracted 30 million viewers. As SPF director, Bishop Sheen worked tirelessly to promote mission awareness and raise funds for the poor churches in mission lands. He started a pocket-sized Mission magazine and wrote his own crisp text, illustrated with graphic photos from the mission world. He also devised a mission Rosary with each of the five decades a different color to represent the missions in Asia, Africa, the Americas, Europe and the Pacific Islands.

Father Andrew Small (OMI - Missionary Oblates of Mary Immaculate) was appointed in 2011 as the National Director for the Pontifical Mission Societies in the United States. In August 2013, Father Small travelled to Lisieux to collect the writing desk (the écritoire) of St. Thérèse of Lisieux, on which she wrote the spiritual classic Story of a Soul. The Pontifical Mission Societies sponsored a tour of the desk in the United States from August to October 2013.

In April 2021, Monsignor Kieran E. Harrington of the Diocese of Brooklyn, was named the new national director of the Pontifical Mission Societies in the U.S. The appointment was made by Cardinal Luis Antonio Tagle, prefect of the Vatican Congregation for the Evangelization of Peoples. Monsignor Harrington succeeded Father Andrew Small, OMI, who had completed his second five-year term.

In February 2024, Harrington stepped down from his position and Rev. Anthony D. Andreassi was appointed as ad interim National Director of The Pontifical Mission Societies in the United States. In his capacity of National Director, he oversees the U.S. efforts to raise awareness of and gather a Universal Solidarity Fund of support for the Holy Father’s missions throughout Asia, Africa, and the Pacific Islands, as well as parts of Latin America and Europe.

He previously served as the provost of the Brooklyn Oratory and the principal of Regis High School in New York City. He holds a doctorate in history from Georgetown University with a concentration on American Catholicism. He is the author of Teach Me to Be Generous: A History of Regis High School in New York City (2014).

On September 5, The Pontifical Mission Societies in the U.S.A. announced the appointment of Monsignor Roger J. Landry as the national director, effective in January 2025. Monsignor Landry, a priest from the Diocese of Fall River, Massachusetts, previously was the chaplain at the Catholic student center at Columbia University in New York. He served for seven years as a representative of the Holy See at the United Nations, and was designated by Pope Francis in 2016 as a permanent Missionary of Mercy.

Monsignor Landry stepped down as national director in September 2026. Currently, TPMS Chief Operating Officer, Douglas Culp, serves as the interim national director.

== See also ==
- Ignaci Siluvai
