= Giovanni Schiavo =

Italian Roman Catholic priest

Blessed Giovanni Schiavo C.S.I.
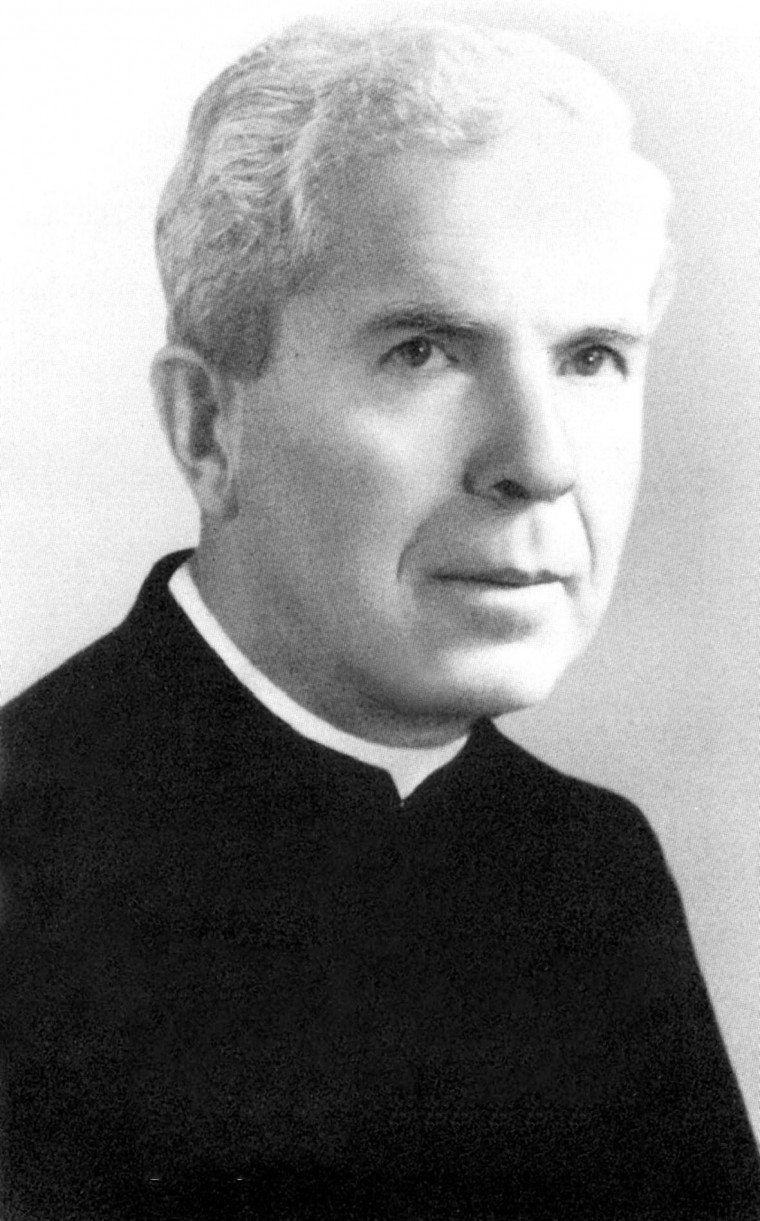

Priest
- Born: 8 July 1903; Sant'Urbano de Montecchio Maggiore, Vicenza, Kingdom of Italy
- Died: 27 January 1967 (aged 63); Caxias do Sul, Rio Grande do Sul, Brazil
- Venerated in: Roman Catholic Church
- Beatified: 28 October 2017, Caxias do Sul, Rio Grande do Sul, Brazil by Cardinal Angelo Amato
- Feast: 27 January
- Attributes: Priest's attire
- Patronage: Missionaries; Against liver cancer; Against hepatitis

Giovanni Schiavo, CSI (8 July 1903 – 27 January 1967) was an Italian Catholic priest in the Congregation of Saint Joseph, also known as the Murialdines.

Schiavo entered the Murialdines during World War I in 1917, and was admitted by Eugenio Reffo. He was ordained to the priesthood in Vicenza in 1927. His superiors allowed him to join the missions – and to spread the charism of the Murialdines – in Brazil, where he served from 1931 until his death several decades later.

His beatification process began under Pope John Paul II in Brazil on 28 April 2001, when he was given the title of Servant of God, and the confirmation of his life of heroic virtue allowed Pope Francis to declare him a Venerable on 14 December 2015. Francis approved a miracle to him on 1 December 2016. Schiavo was beatified in celebration held in Caxias do Sul, with Cardinal Angelo Amato presiding on 28 October 2017.

== Life ==
Giovanni Schiavo was born in Montecchio Maggiore – in Vicenza – as the first of nine children to the poor but pious parents, Luigi Schiavo and Rosa Fittorelli. He suffered from meningitis for four years, which almost killed him.

At age eighteen, he received an offer to work in the local council but turned this offer down; he had already decided to enter religious life. He sought the aid of the parish priest, Giuseppe Dalla Pria, who encouraged him and aided him on his path to realizing his religious vocation. Schiavo's strong call towards religious life led him to decide to become a priest.

He was educated by members of the Congregation of Saint Joseph, who had such an impact on the seminarian that he developed an intense devotion to Saint Joseph and requested to be admitted into that order. One of the founders of that order, Eugenio Reffo, welcomed him into the order in 1917.

Schiavo his novitiate in Volvera. He made his first profession on 28 August 1919 and made his final vows in 1925. He began his philosophical and theological studies for the priesthood in 1919. Schiavo dreamed of being sent to the missions in Ecuador and was ready even to die there for his faith if anti-religious forces persecuted him.

He was ordained to the priesthood on 10 July 1927 in Vicenza and served until 1931 as a pastor in Italian cities such as Modena and Oderzo. In 1931, his superiors allowed him to go to their missions in Brazil as a means of spreading the charism of their order and cementing the order's presence in that nation. Schiavo never returned to his native land. On 26 July 1930, he wrote in his journal about his desire to remain true to the Gospel and the teachings of Jesus Christ as he prepared for a new assignment. He had been put on a waiting list but believed he would soon go to Brazil. His superiors made the decision to send him to Brazil on 4 June 1931, and he recorded in his journal: "I was chosen for the missions of Brazil ... Deo Gratias!" He completed a spiritual retreat to Albano in 1931 in order to prepare for this mission and departed on 4 August 1931.

The priest arrived in Jagurão on 5 September 1931, where he began his mission. However, he was reassigned on 25 November 1931 and sent to Ana Rech. He then served as a school director at Galópolis from 1935 to 1936. When it closed in 1937, he returned to Ana Rech. In Brazil, he served as the provincial superior for his order from 1947 until his resignation in February 1956. He also served as the master of novices and as a teacher for a brief period.

Schiavo was tasked with supervising the formation and ongoing spiritual cultivation of a Brazilian group of nuns of the Murialdines. Priests and religious communities alike requested his spiritual guidance. In 1957, he founded the School Sisters of Saint Maria Goretti, where he acted as the community's director, in addition to assuming the duties of a teacher.

Padre Schiavo was hospitalized for a serious illness on 20 November 1966. He had serious liver complications, exacerbated by hepatitis. He was diagnosed on 15 December 1966 with liver cancer following a biopsy. Surgery was deemed impossible because of the risk of cardiac arrest during the procedure, and anesthesia was scarce.

He died of that illness at 9:30am on 27 January 1967. In the hours before his death he continued to repeat: "My Jesus – mercy!" and his final words were: "Father, I am Your son; I always wanted to do Your will". The Bishop of Caxias do Sul Benedito Zorzi and his auxiliary bishop Cândido Julio Bampi were present at his death. Bishop Zorzi celebrated his funeral at the cathedral, and his remains were interred on 28 January 1967 in a simple grave. On 16 March 2015, a chapel was built around his grave.

== Beatification ==
The beatification process began under Pope John Paul II on 28 April 2001, and he was given the title of a Servant of God when the Congregation for the Causes of Saints issued the official "nihil obstat" – or 'nothing against' to the cause. The process began on a diocesan level in Caxias do Sul. Bishop Nei Paulo Moretto oversaw the inauguration of the diocesan process on 9 September 2001 and also oversaw its closure on 18 October 2003. The then-Congregation of the Causes of the Saints issued the validation to the process on 20 November 2004, and it allowed for the postulation to submit the official Positio dossier to the C.C.S. in 2012.

Theologians – all nine of them – voted in favor of the merits of Schiavo's cause on 5 March 2015, while the cardinal and bishop members of the C.C.S. approved this verdict on 27 October 2015. Schiavo was named as Venerable on 14 December 2015 after Pope Francis confirmed that the late priest had indeed lived a model Christian life of heroic virtue.

The miracle required for his beatification was investigated in Brazil in a diocesan process from 19 March 2009 until 12 September 2009, when the process concluded, and all documentation was shipped in boxes to Rome to the C.C.S. on 24 September 2009. The process was made valid on 4 June 2010. The medical board voiced their approval to the miracle on 18 February 2016 while theologians also voted likewise on 21 June 2016. The C.C.S. met to discuss the miracle on 18 October 2016. Pope Francis approved this on 1 December 2016.

It was reported that the beatification would have taken place in January 2017 if the miracle received papal approval sometime in either November or December 2016, however this was debunked when the official date was scheduled some months later. The beatification was celebrated in Caxias do Sul on 28 October 2017, and Cardinal Angelo Amato presided over the celebration on the pope's behalf.

The current postulator assigned to the cause is Orides Ballardin.

=== Miracle ===
The miracle in question for his beatification involves the cure of Juvelino Cara, who was rushed to hospital on 9 September 1997. He suffered severe abdominal pains and was later diagnosed with incurable acute peritonitis. Cara's wife invoked the intercession of the late Schiavo, and Cara recuperated at a rapid pace over the next week.
