= Leonardo Murialdo =

Italian Roman Catholic saint (1828–1900)

Saint Leonardo Murialdo CSI
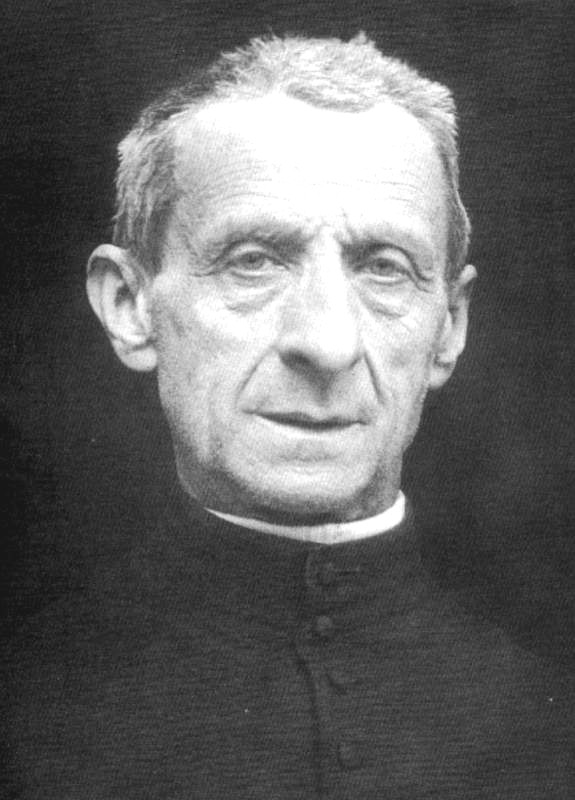

Priest
- Born: 26 October 1828; Turin, Kingdom of Sardinia
- Died: 30 March 1900 (aged 71); Turin, Kingdom of Italy
- Resting place: Parish Sanctuary "Nostra Signora della Salute", Turin, Italy
- Venerated in: Roman Catholic Church
- Beatified: 3 November 1963, Saint Peter's Basilica, Vatican City by Pope Paul VI
- Canonized: 3 May 1970, Saint Peter's Square, Vatican City by Pope Paul VI
- Feast: 30 March; 18 May (Salesians)
- Attributes: Priest's attire; Book
- Patronage: Congregation of Saint Joseph; Apprentices

Leonardo Murialdo, CSI (26 October 1828 – 30 March 1900) was an Italian Catholic priest and the co-founder of the Congregation of Saint Joseph - also known as the Murialdines (which he founded alongside Eugenio Reffo).

Murialdo's call to the priesthood did not manifest until late in his education in Savona; he pursued his ecclesial studies and was ordained as such in 1851 before dedicating himself to social work alongside the poor and with adolescent men. This put him into contact with other priests of the era such as Giovanni Bosco and Giuseppe Cafasso who held Murialdo in great esteem. His zeal for social concern saw his frequent calls for an end to worker exploitation and the granting of further rights to workers in factories.

Murialdo died in the odour of holiness in 1900 and had a reputation for deep personal holiness. This became more prevalent in northern Italian cities where Murialdo and his religious order worked. The cause for his canonization opened under Pope Benedict XV in 1921 with Pope John XXIII later confirming his heroic virtue and naming Murialdo as Venerable in 1961. Pope Paul VI beatified Murialdo in late 1963 and later canonized him just under a decade later in 1970.

== Life ==
=== Education ===
Leonardo Murialdo was born on 26 October 1828 in Turin as the seventh of nine children to the upper middle-class Leonardo Franchino Murialdo (1776 or 1777-15.06.1833) and Teresa Rho (c. 1795-9.07.1849). His father - a stockbroker - died in 1833 during his childhood. His nickname as a child was "Nadino". Before him, six sisters were born and after him, his brother and sister; his siblings were (in order):

Elder -

- Olimpia
- Aurelia
- Dionisia
- Emilia
- Clementine (died in her childhood)
- Domitillia

Younger -

- Ernesto
- Delfina (1830-???)

Murialdo received his baptism on 27 October in the San Dalmazzo parish church.

In 1836, both he and his brother Ernesto were sent to the Piarist boarding school (Scolopian College) in Savona which he attended until 1843; the pair arrived via coach on 27 October in the evening after having departed Turin on 25 October. His initial education there lasted until 1838 while he began his high school education there from 1838 until 1843. He studied the humanities and grammar and two of his educators were the priests Atanasio Canata and Giovanni Solari. But he felt a deep personal crisis from 1842 to 1843 due to his fellow pupils' poor behaviour and tendencies. He and his brother returned to Turin in September 1843 where he made his first Confession to the abbot Pullini. On 3 November 1843, he returned to Savona to begin a philosophical course but also chose ancient historical sciences to avoid bad companions that had forced his earlier departure from the school. In spring 1844 he listened to the Capuchin friar Vincenzo Oliva give a Lenten sermon about Hell which had a profound impact on Murialdo to the point where he decided to consecrate himself to God. He decided he wanted to become a Capuchin in the spirit of detachment though the canon Lorenzo Renaldi - a close friend - dissuaded Murialdo and suggested he just become a diocesan priest instead.

Murialdo's confessor during his time in Savona was Marcantonio Durando; Durando would be the one leading him in a spiritual retreat in preparation for his ordination. He completed his philosophical course (which he commenced in 1843) on 6 November 1845 and was then vested in the cassock for the first time after the abbot Pullini blessed the cassock in the Santa Chiara church once Murialdo began his ecclesial studies. Murialdo later wrote that "he never had a thought" about becoming a priest. Upon his return to Turin he began his ecclesial studies in 1845 at the college (as an external cleric student) there.

He never believed he would become a priest and it was believed that his brother Ernesto would do so. In his childhood, he wanted to pursue a career in the armed forces while in Savona entertaining notions of learning civil law. During his philosophical course, he set himself on becoming an engineer. He began a theological course in Turin from 1845 to 1850 as an external clerical student and his two tutors during this time were the theologians Augusto Berta and Pietro Baricco. His academic course ended on 8 May 1850 and he received excellent results.

=== Priesthood ===
He received his ordination to the priesthood on 20 September 1851 in the Church of the Visitation from Monsignor Giovanni Domenico Ceretti; the latter also made Murialdo a subdeacon (21 September 1850) and a deacon (5 April 1851). He celebrated his first Mass at San Dalmazzo church with abbot Maximo Pullini and canon Lorenzo Renaldi co-celebrating alongside him. Murialdo's first focus after his ordination was to work in the poor Vanchiglia neighbourhood close to the Oratorio dell'Angelo Custode which his cousin Roberto Murialdo managed. It was one of the first oratories in Turin to minister to poor and abandoned children on the fringes of living. From 1857 until 1865 he was - at the request of John Bosco, the director for the Oratorio di San Luigi. Murialdo conferred and collaborated with Don Bosco as well as Joseph Cafasso.

On 28 September 1865, he left Turin and went to the Saint-Sulpice church in Paris to further his theological studies in moral matters and to further himself in canon law. It was during this time that he attended a conference of the Vincentians and later visited London. In Paris, he wanted to become a Sulpician but the superior Henri Icard dissuaded him from this. Murialdo returned to Turin in October 1866 and was put in charge of the Artigianelli Boarding School where adolescent men were educated and taught a trade. In 1870 he became the director of the Oratorio di San Martino. In 1871 he organized the Union of Catholic Workers on behalf of the women and other people who worked in factories. In 1871 he also was among the promoters of the popular Catholic libraries. In 1858 he met Pope Pius IX in a private audience after Bosco wanted Murialdo to go with him to meet the pontiff.

In 1873 he established the Congregation of Saint Joseph in honour of Saint Joseph as a model for labourers and did this with Eugenio Reffo as his collaborator in this venture. He conferred with Father Icard and the theologian William Blengio to discuss his dream while also conferring with the Bishop of Alba Eugenio Roberto Galletti and the Archbishop of Turin Alessandro Riccardi di Netro as well as his successor Lorenzo Gastaldi. The aim was to support apprentices and people in trades. He further founded an agricultural school in addition to a centre for delinquents. In 1876 he founded the Association of the Good Press to improve Italian journalism while - alongside Pio Paolo Perazzo - founded the newspaper The Voice of the Worker which became the diocesan paper known as The Voice of the People.

Murialdo contracted a grave illness in 1877 but his friend Don Bosco said that he would live for much longer and would not die from his illness. In 1878 he founded an agricultural centre in Rivoli and later in 1892 - in the spirit of Pope Leo XIII's Rerum Novarum - wrote to the local council to denounce the exploitation of workers. He also presented a reform project including schooling until age fourteen and the abolition of night work. His last surviving siblings Aurelia and Ernesto both died in 1890 causing Murialdo great grief since all his friends and relatives were deceased at this stage.

=== Declining health and death ===
In 1885 he suffered serious bronchitis that lasted from 1 January until 17 February; Murialdo believed he would die during this time due to the seriousness of his illness. Don Bosco visited him and blessed him.

Murialdo died on 30 March 1900 in Turin due to pneumonia; his final words were: "I'm waiting". His remains were interred after his funeral but later transferred to the Santa Barbara church in Turin.

== Sainthood ==
The formal cause of canonization started under Pope Benedict XV on 23 November 1921 and conferred on him the title of Servant of God. The diocesan process for investigating Murialdo's life and reputation for holiness took place in Turin from 1910 until 1913. His writings received theological approval on 13 December 1916; the Congregation for Rites validated the diocesan investigation on 2 March 1932. The work culminated in the declaration of his life of heroic virtue on 26 April 1961 when Pope John XXIII proclaimed him to be Venerable. Pope Paul VI beatified him on 3 November 1963 and later canonized him less than a decade later in 1970.

=== General Audience ===
On 28 April 2010 - during his General Audience - Pope Benedict XVI spoke about Murialdo on the occasion of the Year of Priests that the pontiff had convoked. He referred to Murialdo's "loving response to God" in doing His will as well as "his conviction of the merciful love of God". The pope continued that Murialdo possessed a keen and "serene awareness of his own limitations" from his own education to his priesthood and during his social apostolate which the pope referred to as "the tireless zeal of action".

Benedict XVI concluded that Murialdo "abandoned himself with trust to Providence" which motivated his life and had a profound influence on his social apostolate in Turin.

== Namesakes ==
Murialdo has become the focus for several locations and organizations such as:

- The San Leonardo Murialdo parish located in Milan.
- The Instituto Leonardo Murialdo is located in Albano Lazio; the Murialdines manage it to provide an education to children.
- The Oratorio di San Leonardo Murialdo in Popesti Leordeni for adolescents.
- The San Leonardo Murialdo church on Via Salvatore Pincerle 144 in Rome was built in 1978 and consecrated a decade later in 1988.
