= Charles Asa Schleck =

American Catholic prelate

Charles Asa Schleck, CSC (July 5, 1925 – July 12, 2011) was a Catholic prelate, who served as undersecretary of the Congregation for the Evangelization of Peoples and President of the Pontifical Mission Societies (from 1995 to 2001).

== Biography ==
Schleck was born in Milwaukee, Wisconsin. In 1950 he completed a Bachelor of Theology at the Pontifical University of St. Thomas Aquinas, Angelicum in Rome. He was ordained a Roman Catholic priest for the Congregation of Holy Cross on 22 December 1951, aged 26. Schleck continued his studies at the Angelicum completing a licentiate in 1952 and doctorate in theology 1953 with a dissertation entitled A Study of Sacramental Grace in General.

On February 10, 1995, he was appointed undersecretary of the Congregation for the Evangelization of Peoples and titular Archbishop of Africa by Pope John Paul II. He was ordained a bishop on April 1, 1995, aged 69, and retired in 2000.

He died on July 12, 2011, shortly after his 86th birthday, holding the positions of Official Emeritus of the Congregation for the Evangelization of Peoples and titular Archbishop of Africa.

Catholic Church titles
Preceded by –	Undersecretary of the Congregation for the Evangelization of Peoples; 1995–2000	Succeeded by –
