= Piergiuseppe Vacchelli =

Styles of Piergiuseppe Vacchelli
- Reference style: The Most Reverend
- Spoken style: Your Excellency
- Religious style: Monsignor
- Posthumous style: none

Piergiuseppe Vacchelli (born 4 February 1937) is the current adjunct secretary emeritus of the Congregation for the Evangelization of Peoples and president of the Pontifical Mission Societies since his retirement was accepted by Pope Benedict XVI on 26 June 2012. He previously served as under-secretary of the Italian Episcopal Conference and chairman of its Charitable Assistance for the Third World.

== Early life ==
Vacchelli was born in Longardore di Sospiro in 1937. From 1948 to 1961 he attended the minor and then the major seminary of the Diocese of Cremona, into which he was incardinated as a cleric. His priestly ordination was on 27 May 1961.

From late 1961 to autumn 1963, he exercised his priestly ministry in the Parish of St. John Cross. He was sent to Rome in 1963 for studies in Canon Law at the Pontifical Gregorian University. He was awarded the JCL and returned to his diocese in 1967. In that year he was appointed to the pastoral service of the Parish of St. Peter in Cremona. In 1973 he was appointed secretary of the Bishop and, from 1975, also chancellor, a post he held until 1986. In 1986 he was appointed Pro-Vicar General of the diocese. From 1990 to 1993 he acted as Secretary General of the Diocesan Synod. In 1993 he was appointed parish priest and canon of the Cathedral of Cremona.

== Adjunct Secretary ==
Over the years he taught canon law and religion in the diocesan seminary at the School of Science and Letters Institute. From October 1996 he held the office of undersecretary of the Italian Episcopal Conference and chairman of its committee for charitable aid for developing countries. He was appointed adjunct secretary of the Congregation for the Evangelization of Peoples in 2008 and at the same time Titular Archbishop of Minturnae, receiving episcopal ordination on 3 July from Cardinal Secretary of State Tarcisio Bertone, S.D.B.

He knows French, Spanish and English.
