= World Mission Sunday =

Day in the Catholic Church

- Significance: Christian mission
- Date: Penultimate Sunday of October
- 2025 date: October 19
- 2026 date: October 18
- 2027 date: October 17
- 2028 date: October 15
- Frequency: Annual
- Started by: Pontifical Mission Societies

World Mission Sunday is a day set aside by the Catholic Church throughout the world to publicly renew its commitment to the missionary movements through prayer and donations. It is celebrated by the Church around the world every year on the second-to-last Sunday of October (October 18, 2026; October 24, 2027).

The funds raised are managed through the Pontifical Mission Societies, also known in many places as Missio, and allocated to mission territories to support the Catholic Church's evangelizing, educational, and social work in those countries. Pope Leo XIV has established the theme for 2026 is "One in Christ, United in Mission".

The origins of World Mission Sunday trace back to 1822, when Pauline Jaricot founded the Society for the Propagation of the Faith to support missionaries through prayer, sacrifice, and financial aid. Donations were sent from other countries to territories where the Catholic Church was carrying out its mission. In 1922, Pope Pius XI elevated the initiative to a pontifical society, and in 1926 the Church celebrated the first World Mission Sunday.

== Historical background ==
The work of the Catholic Missions is considered an ongoing task for the whole Church. For this reason, the World Mission Sunday efforts are also a time to remember the last words of Jesus to his faithful. Matthew's Gospel records the final directive of Jesus to his disciples as follows:

Go therefore and make disciples of all nations, baptizing them in the name of the Father and of the Son and of the Holy Spirit, and teaching them to obey everything that I have commanded you. And remember, I am with you always, to the end of the age. - Matthew 28:19-20

World Mission Sunday traces its roots to Blessed Pauline Jaricot, a 19th-century French laywoman who mobilized prayer and support for the Church's missionary efforts. In 1822, in Lyon, France, she founded the Society for the Propagation of the Faith to support and promote the Church's missionary activity throughout the world. Her first fundraising circles helped support the Church in the United States — then a mission territory itself — until 1908. Her initiative was formally recognized and praised by Pope Gregory XVI in 1840, laying the foundation for what would become one of the Church's principal missionary organizations.

A century later, on May 3, 1922, Pope Pius XI elevated the Society to the status of a Pontifical Mission Society through the motu proprio Romanorum Pontificum. In doing so, he approved its General Statutes and established an organizational structure that closely resembles that of the Pontifical Mission Societies today. The Society's primary mission is to foster among all the faithful a sense of responsibility for the Church's missionary work through prayer—including reflection on Sacred Scripture, Eucharistic adoration, and the recitation of the Rosary—as well as material support for the missions, most visibly expressed through the annual celebration of World Mission Sunday.

Pope Pius XI further emphasized the centrality of missionary activity in his 1926 encyclical Rerum Ecclesiae, which addressed the Church's role in evangelizing the world, particularly in non-Christian territories. Reaffirming the missionary priorities that had marked the beginning of his pontificate, he declared: "The Church herself has no other reason for existing than to make all people sharers in saving Redemption through the spread of the Kingdom of Christ throughout the world." This vision helped shape the missionary outlook of the twentieth century and reinforced the importance of structures capable of coordinating and supporting the Church's global missionary efforts.

For much of their history, The Pontifical Mission Societies carried out this mission under the direction of the Congregation for the Evangelization of Peoples (Propaganda Fide). Established by Pope Gregory XV on June 22, 1622, through the papal bull Inscrutabili Divinae Providentiae, the Congregation served as the Holy See's principal body for directing and coordinating missionary activity worldwide. Its responsibilities included promoting local clergy, supporting missionary formation, and providing material assistance to mission territories. Within this framework, The Pontifical Mission Societies functioned as the Church's primary instrument for missionary animation and fundraising, including the organization and administration of World Mission Sunday collections.

This relationship continued until 2022, when Pope Francis' reform of the Roman Curia transferred the responsibilities of the Congregation to the newly established Dicastery for Evangelization. Today, The Pontifical Mission Societies—and consequently World Mission Sunday—continue their work under the authority of the Dicastery, maintaining their essential role in supporting the Church's universal missionary mission.

== Key dates ==
- 1822: Foundation of the Society for the Propagation of the Faith by Blessed Pauline Jaricot in Lyon, France. This was the direct precursor of the Pontifical Mission Societies.
- 1922: On May 3, 1922, through the motu proprio Romanorum Pontificium, Pope Pius XI recognized the Society for the Propagation of the Faith as a Pontifical Mission Society and approved its General Statutes.
- 1926: Pius XI instituted an "annual mission day" for the whole universal Church.
- 1927: First worldwide collection for World Mission Sunday in October.
- Mid-20th century: The Pontifical Mission Societies and World Mission Sunday spread to virtually every diocese in the world, with growing national and international coordination, including offices in more than 120 countries.
- October 2019: Extraordinary Missionary Month proclaimed by Pope Francis for the whole month in the universal Church, under the theme “Baptized and Sent: The Church of Christ on Mission in the World.”
- March 2022: Pope Francis' reform of the Roman Curia transferred the responsibilities of The Pontifical Mission Societies, including World Mission Sunday, to the newly established Dicastery for Evangelization.
- October 2025: Pope Leo XIV, elected on May 8, 2025, presided over his first World Mission Sunday as the Church’s first modern-era missionary pope.

== Purpose and objectives ==
The Pontifical Mission Societies understand World Mission Sunday as a pastoral instrument to renew the universal call to mission and to promote solidarity among Catholics from all particular Churches. According to their own statutes, the main purpose of the four Societies is to foster in all the baptized a universal missionary spirit, especially through prayer and sacrifice, and to encourage collaboration with the Church's evangelizing activity in the so-called "mission territories".

Within this framework, World Mission Sunday highlights the complementary role of prayer, sacrifice, and financial support. The Pontifical Mission Societies define themselves as a "worldwide network at the service of the Pope to support the mission and the young Churches with prayer and charity". inviting the Catholic faithful to offer constant prayers for missionaries, to unite their personal sacrifices and hardships with the mission of the Church, and to make donations according to their means. These contributions support pastoral and catechetical programs, the construction and maintenance of churches and chapels, the formation of seminarians and pastoral agents, as well as educational, health care, and social projects in young churches.

Through World Mission Sunday collections and other forms of collaboration, the Pontifical Mission Societies today support more than 1,130 mission territories across Africa, Asia, Oceania, Latin America, and some areas of Europe. These territories include dioceses and apostolic vicariates that, because of their limited resources, depend largely on this universal solidarity fund.

In 2025, funds collected on World Mission Sunday were used to support:

- 26 million children
- 82,498 seminarians
- 8,750 shelters
- 12,000 health centers
- 844,000 catechists
- 258,540 religious sisters

== Global organization and administration ==
World Mission Day is a global effort led by the Holy See and carried out through a network of missionary organizations and local Churches. The following entities coordinate and promote its worldwide celebration and collection:

- The Dicastery for Evangelization, Section for the First Evangelization and New Particular Churches manages the collection and disbursement of funds.
- The Pontifical Mission Societies, with national offices worldwide, such as TPMS USA oversee the local collections in each country.
- The Dicastery for Communication produces the Pope's video message, which is then released through Vatican News.
- Episcopal conferences and parishes around the world encourage the faithful to participate in prayer and donations to this initiative, just as Pope Pius XI envisioned it.

The distribution of funds follows a hierarchical and centralized structure designed to guarantee ecclesial communion and an equitable allocation of resources. Contributions from the faithful are ordinarily collected in parishes and dioceses, which send them to the national offices of the Pontifical Mission Societies in each country. From these national offices, the funds are sent to the central headquarters in Rome, under the authority of the Dicastery for Evangelization, where projects are reviewed and aid is allocated to the different mission territories according to established criteria, such as pastoral need, number of faithful, and presence of local clergy. The funds are then transferred to the recipient missionary dioceses, which administer them according to the approved projects.

== Pope Leo XIV's support ==
In 2025, the election of Pope Leo XIV marked a renewed focus on missionary activity in the Catholic Church. Formerly the Bishop of Chiclayo, Peru, Pope Leo brought firsthand experience as a missionary to his papacy. In his first Urbi et Orbi blessing, he emphasized the need to be “a missionary Church,” one that “builds bridges and encourages dialogue” and remains “ever open to welcoming” those in need.

This vision was deepened in his address to the General Assembly of the Pontifical Mission Societies, where he affirmed their role as the Church’s "primary means of awakening missionary responsibility among all the baptized" and praised their global efforts to support pastoral work, education, and vocations in young churches.

His pastoral background in Latin America and emphasis on communion and universality reflect an approach to evangelization centered on accompaniment, unity, and synodality. This perspective aligns with the stated mission of the Pontifical Mission Societies, which support emerging and underserved Catholic communities globally.

The theme, chosen by Pope Leo XIV for 2026, is "One in Christ, united in mission". This theme centers on unity in faith and a shared missionary calling, marking the 100th anniversary of the first World Mission Sunday. Pope Leo XIV, on June 1, 2026, said: "Thanks to the funds raised on World Mission Sunday, the Pontifical Society of the Propagation of the Faith is able to provide necessary help to the over 1,130 ecclesiastical circumscriptions that depend on the Dicastery for Evangelization, Section for First Evangelization and New Particular Churches, to help them establish necessary ecclesiastical infrastructures and support diverse missionary initiatives."

He is the first pontiff to ever record a personal video message for World Mission Sunday.

== Themes by year ==
Year	Theme and focus	Official Link
2026	"One in Christ United in Mission"	2026 Message
2025	"Missionaries of Hope Among all Peoples"	2025 Message
2024	"Go and invite everyone to the banquet" (cf. Matthew 22:9)	2024 Message
2023	"Hearts on fire, feet on the move" (cf. Luke 24:13-35). Focussed on missionary and educational work in Kibera, Nairobi.	2023 Message
2022	"You shall be my witnesses" (Acts 1:8). Focussed on families in Ethiopia.	2022 Message
2021	"We cannot but speak about what we have seen and heard" (Acts 4:20); Focussed on work to build peace in Nigeria.	2021 Message
2020	"Here am I, send me" (Isaiah 6:8); Focussed on work with communities in Malawi.	2020 Message
2019	"Baptized and Sent: The Church of Christ on Mission in the World"	2019 Message
2018	"Together with young people, let us bring the Gospel to all"	2018 Message
2017	"Mission at the heart of the Christian faith"	2017 Message
2016	"Missionary Church, Witness of Mercy"	2016 Message

== Liturgical and pastoral observance ==
Rooted in Scripture and Canon Law

On World Mission Sunday, parishes are invited to support the missionary work of the Church through prayer and donations. The observance of World Mission Sunday is supported by provisions in the Code of Canon Law, which require dioceses to promote missionary activity and celebrate an annual day dedicated to the missions. Canon Law 791 states:

Can. 791 To foster missionary cooperation in individual dioceses:

1. missionary vocations are to be promoted;
2. a priest is to be designated to promote effectively endeavors for the missions, especially the Pontifical Missionary Works;
3. an annual day for the missions is to be celebrated;
4. a suitable offering for the missions is to be contributed each year and sent to the Holy See.

This makes the annual collection for the missionary work of the Church the only canonically mandated collection.

Biblical Roots

The work of the Catholic Missions is still an ongoing task for the whole Church. For this reason, the World Mission Sunday efforts are also a time to remember the last words of Jesus to his faithful. Matthew's Gospel records the last words of Jesus as follows:

Go, therefore, and make disciples of all nations, baptizing them in the name of the Father, and of the Son, and of the Holy Spirit, teaching them to observe all that I have commanded you. And behold, I am with you always, until the end of the age. Matthew 28:19-20.

How It Is Celebrated

On World Mission Sunday, parishes are encouraged to say a special Mass for the missions, such as the Mass for the Evangelization of Peoples or the standard Sunday Liturgy. Other elements of the liturgy are directed toward the missions, such as specific prayers of the faithful for the missions and missionary vocations. During the second collection, the funds collected will be sent back to the Holy See through each Diocese, and then to the Pontifical Mission Societies.

Parishes and schools are also encouraged to provide catechetical and educational materials to inform the faithful of the importance of this annual collection and the work being done by The Pontifical Mission Societies across the globe.

== Recent developments ==
100th Anniversary Celebration

2026 marks 100 years since Pope Pius XI instituted an "annual mission day" for the whole universal Church, which is now known as World Mission Sunday. Celebration activities were planned for October 2026.

2025 Jubilee Year of Hope

2025 was designated a Jubilee Year of Hope. The Jubilee of the Missionary World and the Jubilee of Migrants were celebrated together on 4-5 October, highlighting the close relationship between evangelization and human mobility. The celebration began with a Jubilee Audience in St. Peter's Square, where Pope Leo XIV welcomed pilgrims from around the world. Following the audience and the opportunity to pass through the Holy Door, the Dicastery for Evangelization, Section for First Evangelization and New Particular Churches, together with the Pontifical Mission Societies, convened at the Pontifical Urbaniana University for a conference entitled The Missio ad Gentes Today: Towards New Horizons. The following day, Pope Leo XIV presided over the Jubilee Mass. The celebration concluded with Migrants and Missionaries of Hope Among All Peoples, an artistic festival featuring testimonies, cultural performances, and music from migrants, missionaries, and artists representing communities from across the globe.

Papal Video Messages

Beginning in 2025, Pope Leo XIV spoke via video about World Mission Sunday. He shared his experience as a missionary in Peru and how the prayers and monetary support provided by the Pontifical Mission Societies greatly aided the local mission efforts.

Global Collaboration with the Dicastery for Evangelization

Pope Francis outlined the global collaboration with the Pontifical Mission Societies and the Discastery for Evangelization in his 2022 Praedicate Evangelium.

“The Section for the First Evangelization and New Particular Churches is entrusted with the Pontifical Mission Societies: the Society for the Propagation of the Faith, the Society of Saint Peter the Apostle, the Holy Childhood Association and the Pontifical Missionary Union of Priests and Religious, as instruments for promoting responsibility for the missions on the part of all the baptized and for the support of new particular Churches.” (Praedicate Evangelium, Art. 67 § 1-2)

This also includes the work exercised as part of World Mission Sunday.

== See also ==
- The Pontifical Mission Societies
- Society for the Propagation of the Faith
- Dicastery for Evangelization
- Pope Pius XI
- Rerum Ecclesiae
- Extraordinary Missionary Month (2019)
