= Society of St. Peter the Apostle =

Catholic pontifical mission society

The Society of St. Peter the Apostle (SPA) is one of the four Pontifical Mission Societies. It is the Catholic Church's official fundraising body for the training of clergy and religious in mission countries.

== History ==
Stephanie Bigard and her daughter Jeanne, of Caen, France, belonged to a society that sent personal equipment for missionaries. This led to a correspondence with the missionaries, most of whom were affiliated with the Paris Foreign Missions Society. They assisted Father Aimé Villion, and contributed to the construction of the church of St. Francis Xavier in Kyoto.

Jules-Alphonse Cousin, then bishop of Nagasaki, asked for financial assistance to keep his seminary open. In 1889 they established a society to raise funds for the training of local clergy, and named it after Saint Peter. The Bigards traveled throughout France promoting the work of the society. In 1922, the Society obtained papal patronage from Pope Pius XI. Its focus is primarily mostly in Africa and Asia.

== Present day ==
The Society of St. Peter Apostle encourages prayer and financial assistance for vocations to the priesthood and religious life in mission dioceses. Today the SPA is established in 157 countries. It supports 1,069 mission dioceses and funds the training of around 20,000 seminarians in about 500 seminaries as well as about 10,000 novices. When a Mass offering is made to The Society of St. Peter Apostle, the stipend is sent to the missions, along with the name of the person or intention for whom the Mass is to be celebrated.

In 2018, the Society contributed to the renovation of St. Augustine's Major Seminary in Zambia. The seminary serves all the diocese in the country.
