= Joseph Cafasso =

Italian priest and social reformer

Saint Joseph Cafasso OFS
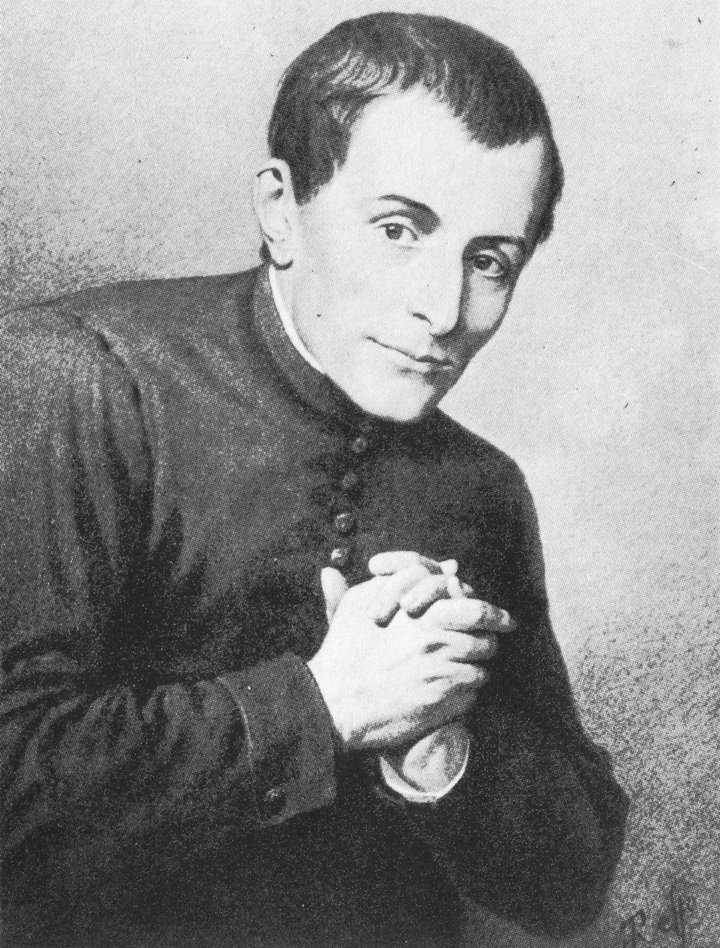
- Print circa 1895.

Franciscan Priest
- Born: 15 January 1811; Castelnuovo d'Asti, Asti, Kingdom of Sardinia
- Died: 23 June 1860 (aged 49); Turin, Kingdom of Sardinia
- Venerated in: Roman Catholic Church
- Beatified: 3 May 1925, Saint Peter's Basilica, Kingdom of Italy by Pope Pius XI
- Canonized: 22 June 1947, Saint Peter's Basilica, Vatican City by Pope Pius XII
- Major shrine: Santuario della Consolata, Turin, Italy
- Feast: 23 June
- Attributes: Priest's attire
- Patronage: Italian prisons; Prison chaplains; Prisoners; Those condemned to death

Joseph Cafasso (Italian: Giuseppe Cafasso; 15 January 1811 – 23 June 1860) was an Italian Catholic priest who was a significant social reformer in Turin. He was one of the so-called "Social Saints" who emerged during that particular era. He is known as the "Priest of the Gallows" due to his extensive work with those prisoners who were condemned to death. But he was also known for his excessive mortifications despite his frail constitution. He neglected certain foods and conditions to remain as frugal and basic as possible unless a doctor ordered otherwise.

The cause for his canonization commenced after his death and led to his beatification in mid-1925 and his canonization two decades later on 22 June 1947; he is a patron for Italian prisoners and prisoners amongst other things.

== Life ==
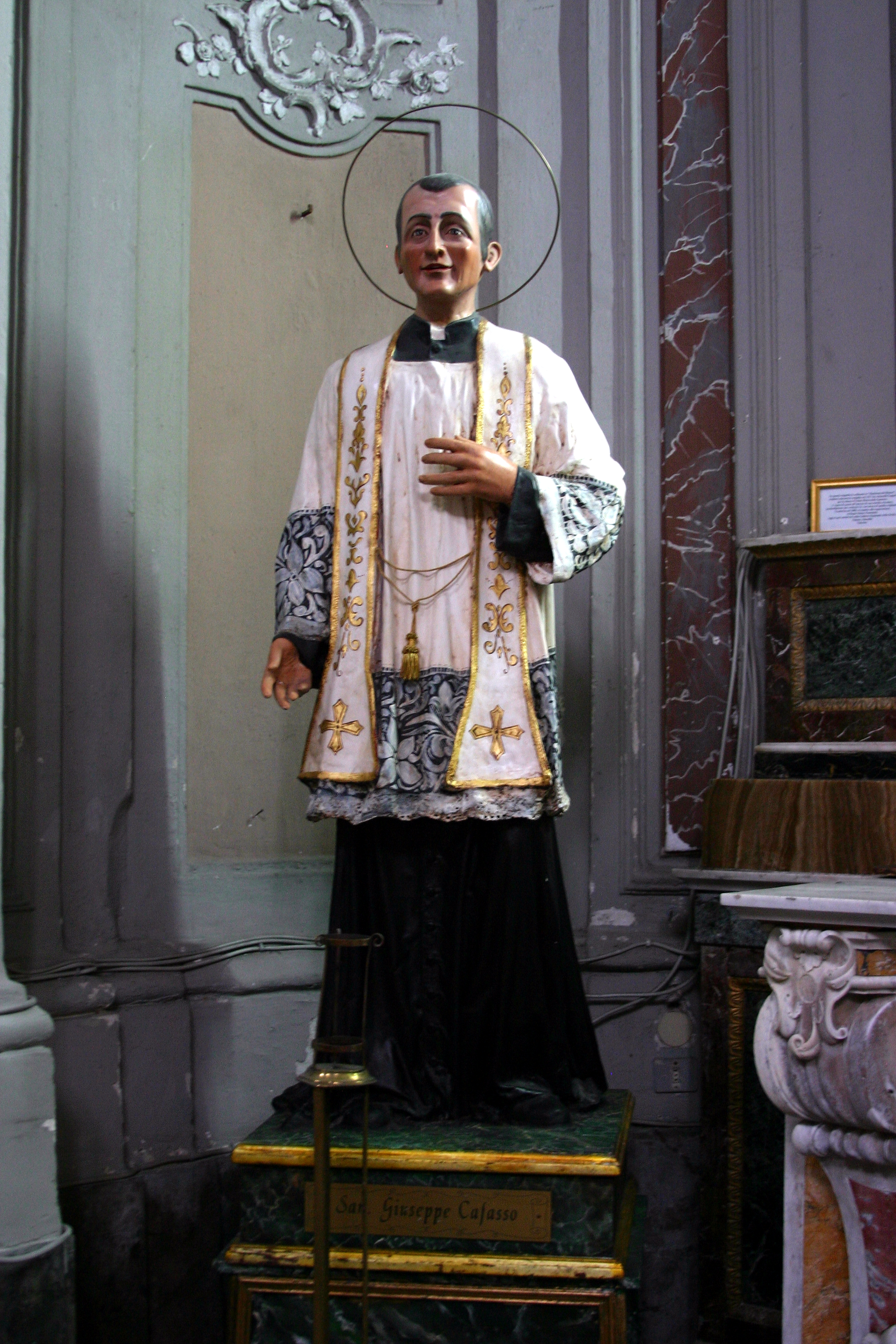
Statue in Palermo.

Giuseppe Cafasso was born to peasants in Castelnuovo d'Asti as the third of four children. His sister Marianna (the fourth and last child) was later to become the mother of Giuseppe Allamano. Cafasso had been born with a deformed spine which contributed to his short stature and frail constitution.

It was often said that no one who knew Cafasso as a child ever could recall him having sinned, seeing him as a model individual. In his childhood Cafasso felt called to become a priest and so commenced his ecclesial studies in Turin and Chieri in order to achieve his dream. During this period he came to know another native of the town - Giovanni Bosco - whom he would later encourage and support in the work of caring for the street urchins in Turin giving them training in various trades. The two first met when Bosco was 14 but both soon became lifelong friends. Cafasso received his ordination to the priesthood in the archdiocesan cathedral on 21 September 1833.

He underwent some further theological studies at the Turin college four months after his ordination and it was at that time that in 1834 that he came to know Luigi Guala (1775-1848) - the co-founder of the Institute of Saint Francis of Assisi. This college was dedicated to the higher education of the diocesan priests who were still recovering from the destruction of the church's institutions under the Napoleonic invasion a generation earlier. He would be connected to this institution for the rest of his life advancing from student to lecturer to chaplain and then at last being named Guala's successor as the college's rector in 1848.

He - at some point - became a professed member of the Third Order of Saint Francis. In his role as a teacher he never neglected his duties as a priest and often aided those students in poor circumstances when he would provide them with books and other things needed for them to complete their studies.

Cafasso became a noted lecturer in moral theological subjects since 1836 and drew on the teachings of the French school in spiritual studies with its leading figures such as Pierre de Bérulle and Vincent de Paul. But a major common element among these figures was the emphasis on the proper formation of priests and indeed ongoing formation it was to be. He worked against the spirit of Jansenism with its strong focus on sin and damnation which he had found to be influential amongst the students. He used the teachings of Alphonsus Liguori and Francis de Sales to moderate the rigorism of the education there while striving to offer simple values and morals as a greater substitute. He likewise fought against state intrusion in the affairs of the church.

The priest was known for his practice of mortifications with the aim of becoming as frugal as possible. He never smoked nor did he drink things other than water alone. He never indulged in coffee nor things between his meals. He never complained about toothaches or headaches but bore his pain with remarkable resilience as a sign of his own personal cross. He was once asked whether or not his constant work ever wore him out and he said: "Our rest will be in Heaven". He celebrated Mass each 4:30 am and was known for spending long hours in the confessional and chapel.

He was also a noted confessor and spiritual director who guided people who would go on to found new religious institutions or congregations which would help the church to meet the needs of the whole world. Bosco was just one (Cafasso was his spiritual director from 1841 to 1860); another was Giulia Falletti di Barolo who became a noted advocate of women prisoners. Francesco Faà di Bruno was but another that he guided as well as Clemente Marchisio. He was also known for his extensive work in the local prisons and served as the comforter of those condemned to death so much so that he was called "The Priest of the Gallows". There was even one occasion when this small and weak priest seized an enormous inmate's beard and told him he would not let go until the man confessed. The inmate did so and wept as he confessed (not from Cafasso tugging at his beard) while giving praise to God as he left the confessional. There was also another occasion in which he escorted 60 converted inmates who had been condemned to the gallows. Most of them were hanged straight after confessing and receiving absolution and so Cafasso referred to them as "hanged saints".

He died on 23 June 1860 and his friend Bosco (who wrote a biographical account of his old friend) preached though was not the celebrant for the Mass. Cafasso had died from pneumonia coupled with a stomach haemorrhage and complications from congenital medical issues. He bequeathed all he had in his will to the Little House of Divine Providence which was the religious order that Giuseppe Benedetto Cottolengo had founded some decades before. The college he had headed until his death moved to the Santuario della Consolata in 1870 and this prompted his remains to be re-interred there.

== Sainthood ==
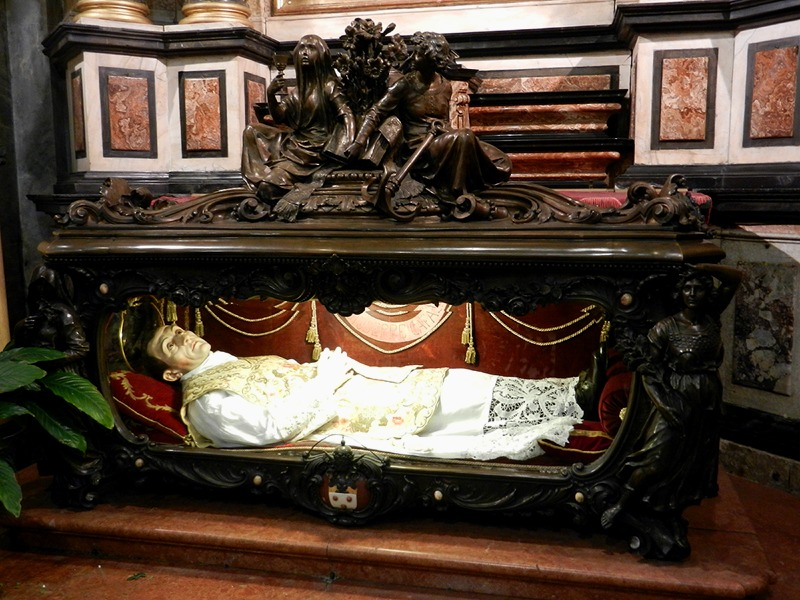
Tomb in the Santuario della Consolata

The process for canonization opened in Turin in a local process that would assess his saintliness and evaluate his spiritual writings; the formal introduction to the cause came in an official decree that Pope Pius X signed on 23 May 1906 while the confirmation of his heroic virtue allowed Pope Benedict XV to title Cafasso as Venerable. Pope Pius XI confirmed two miracles attributed to Cafasso's intercession on 1 November 1924 while - in the official decree - labelling Cafasso as "the educator and formation teacher of priests". Pius XI presided over the beatification on 3 May 1925. Pope Pius XII confirmed two more miracles and canonized Cafasso in Saint Peter's Basilica on 22 June 1947.

Pius XII - on 9 April 1948 - declared him to be the patron saint of all Italian prisons and prisoners. In his apostolic exhortation Menti Nostrae - on 23 September 1950 - the pontiff further offered him as an example to all priests involved as confessors and spiritual directors.

== Monuments and buildings ==
There is a monument that has been erected in his honour in Turin at the road crossing of Corso Regina Margherita and Corso Principe Eugenio and Corso Valdocco (called the Rondò della Forca - or the Gallows Roundabout). In 1968 a church in the Tuscolano district in Rome was dedicated to him.

== See also ==
- Giovanni Bosco
- Giuseppe Allamano (his nephew)
