= Carlo Ceppi =

Italian architect, active mainly in Piedmont

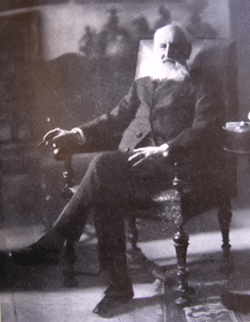

Count Carlo Ceppi (11 October 1829 – 19 November 1921) was an Italian engineer and architect, active mainly in Piedmont.

In 1870, he designed the facade of the church for the nuns of the order of Adoratrice Perpetua delle Santissime Sacramento in Turin. With Stefano Molli, he designed the church of the SS Cuore di Maria in Borgo San Salvatore of Turin and San Gioachino in Turin. He worked with the engineers Constantino Gilodi and Giacomo Salvadori in designing some of the pavilions (labour, architecture, and war) for the 1898 exposition in Turin.
