= Parochial mission =

Church outreach targeting own members

A parochial mission or parish mission is a special pastoral effort in the Catholic Church aimed at preaching to and instructing Catholic followers. These are "home missions" geared toward Catholics, distinguished from apostolic missions to make conversions among non-believers. Such missions may consist of systematic preaching and instruction, extending over a stated number of days, performed by authorized missionaries.

== History ==
Until the beginning of the seventeenth century there existed no organized form of Catholic popular missionary work, as it is now understood. The preaching, for example, of the mendicant orders, was not reduced to a system until the foundation of the Congregation of Priests of the Mission by Vincent de Paul. That was in France; in Italy, a century later (1732), Alphonsus Liguori founded his congregation of Redemptorists. About one hundred years later Gaspar Bufalo (died 1837) founded in Rome the Congregation of the Most Precious Blood to devote itself exclusively to parochial mission work.

The work was taken up by other orders whose primary end was different: the Jesuits, who were the foremost, the Dominicans, Franciscans, Capuchins. After the Bourbon Restoration in 1815, a new impetus was given to missionary work by the Abbé Forbin-Janson, who, with his friend the Abbé de Rauzan, founded the Missionaires de France, and by Charles de Mazenod, who founded the Oblates of Mary Immaculate, at Marseille, in 1815. In Germany parochial missions had been given sporadically, chiefly by the Jesuits and the Redemptorists, before 1848; after that date they became more general. The bishops everywhere encouraged and urged them. The Cardinal Archbishop of Mechlin, in 1843, maintained that the people of every parish are entitled to have the benefit of a mission. During this period the German Church had missionaries who devoted themselves entirely to popular mission work: Peter Roh, Klinkhofström, Pottgieser. On the expulsion of the Jesuits, Redemptorists and other orders from the German Empire, in 1872, there was an interruption.

In Italy systematic mission work was introduced by the Lazarists during the lifetime of their founder. With the rise of the Redemptorists, the Passionists, the Fathers of the Precious Blood, and several other congregations, the work spread over the entire peninsula. In Austria they developed during the reign of Maria Theresa, but under her successor, Emperor Joseph II, missions were to a great extent prohibited, and missionaries banished. The Redemptorists were recalled, but could labour only on condition of submitting to official scrutiny. After the Revolution of 1848 had spent itself that the Redemptorists, Jesuits, Capuchins, and Franciscans carried on the work of missions, especially in Bohemia and the Tyrol, in Westphalia, Bavaria, and Württemberg. On the expulsion of the Jesuits and Redemptorists, missions were again prohibited. Later, however, Capuchins and Franciscans took up the work, and diocesan priests also entered the field as missionaries and directors of retreats. In 1786, Clement Mary Hofbauer, second founder of the Redemptorists, with his friend Thadäus Hübl, founded a house of the congregation in Warsaw, where King Stanislaus Poniatowski placed the German national church of St. Benno at their disposal.

After the death of Alphonsus Liguori, his missionaries evangelized the Catholics in the Russian Provinces of Courland and Livonia, on the invitation of Ferdinando Maria Saluzzo, Apostolic Nuncio in Poland. In Belgium and in the Netherlands the missionary spirit has, with one or two slight interruptions, always been active. The Lazaristsin Great Britain as early as 1640, but penal laws made organized mission work impossible; it resumed about 1850.

In Ireland, missions were recommended by national and provincial synods—e. g., by the Plenary Synod of Thurles, in 1850; by the Synods of Cashel, 1853, and of Tuam, 1854, and the Plenary Synod of Maynooth, 1875. In England they were recommended by the Provincial Council of Westminster, in 1852, and again in 1859; in Scotland by the Plenary Council of 1886. The Plenary Council of Australia, held at Sydney in 1885, and, in Canada, the Provincial Council of Quebec, in 1863, strongly urged parochial missions.

In the United States there was no systematic popular missionary work until about 1860, though missions had been given earlier. The Lazarist Fathers arrived in 1816, the Redemptorists in 1832, and the Passionists in 1852; but the scarcity of priests meant that at first the ordinary spiritual wants of a scattered population took priority. In 1839 Pope Gregory XVI sent the Abbé Forbin-Janson on a missionary tour through the United States, where, for two years, he gave missions to the people and retreats to the clergy. In the Second Provincial Council of Cincinnati (1858), the Second Plenary Council of Baltimore (1866), and the Tenth Provincial Council of Baltimore (1869), parochial missions were strongly recommended. Among the more active missionaries of this period were Fathers Smarius, Weninger, Damen, D. Young, O.P., and Hewit.

"Diocesan apostolates" are groups of priests, selected from the secular clergy, trained for mission work with special reference to the conversion of non-Catholics. They are exempted from ordinary pastoral work, and held in readiness to give missions whenever needed. Under various names—as "Apostolic Missionary Band", "Diocesan Mission Band", etc. -- the system became established in the Archdioceses of New York, St. Louis, St. Paul, and San Francisco, and the Dioceses of Alton, Burlington, Oklahoma, Peoria, Pittsburg, Providence, Richmond, San Antonio, Scranton, and Wheeling.
