= Association of the Living Rosary =

The Living Rosary Association was founded on 8 December 1826 by Pauline Marie Jaricot in Lyon, France. The Catholic Church formally approved the association through a canonical letter in February, 1827. The aims of the association were two; to bring the people of France to a prayerful way of life and distribute Catholic literature and devotional articles. The original Living Rosary Association slowly declined; however, the tradition has been revived in various forms.

== History ==
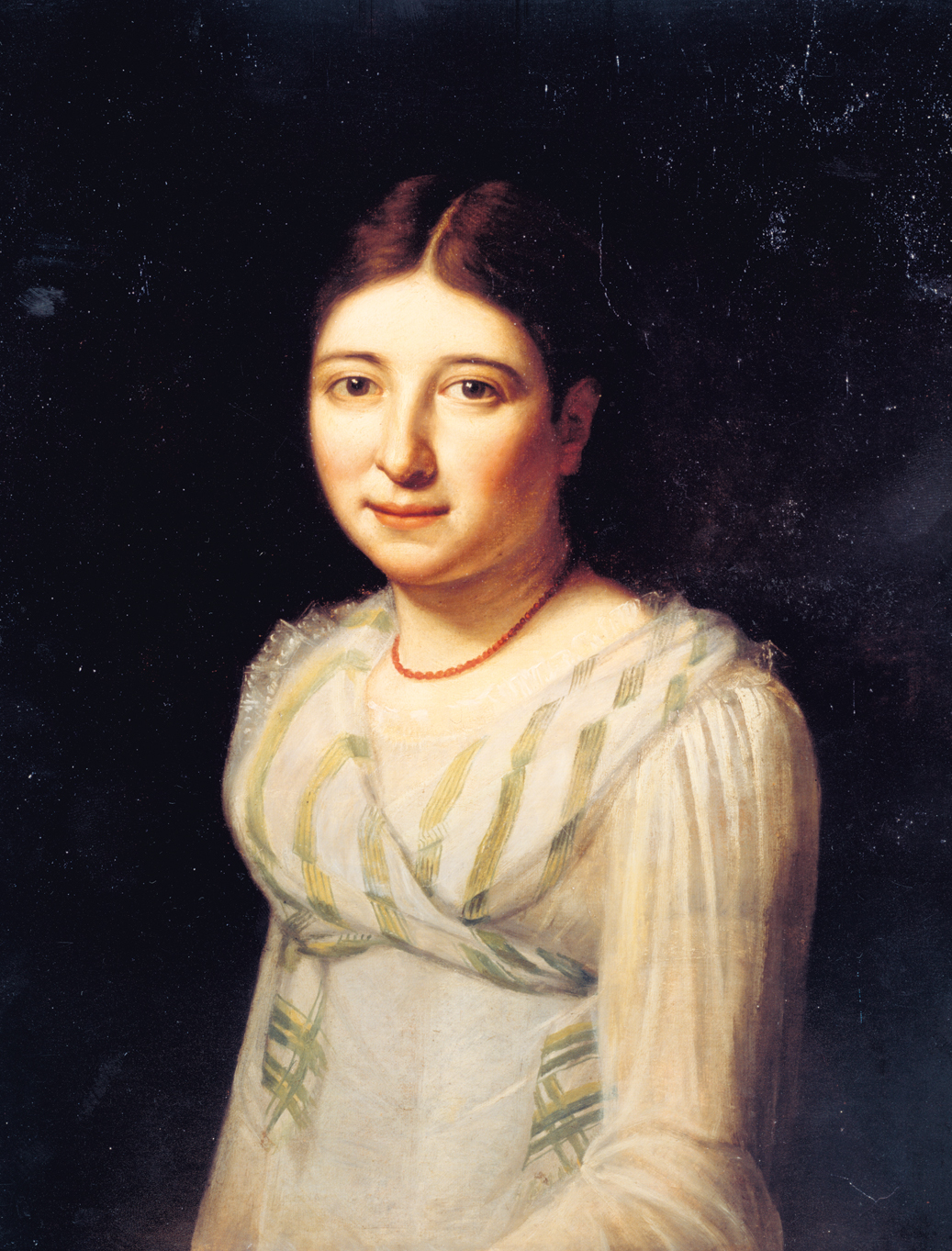
Pauline Jaricot, foundress of the Association of the Living Rosary.

Pauline Marie Jaricot was born to a very pious Catholic family in Lyon, France, on July 22, 1799. Through her brother, she developed a real concern for the Asian missions. In May 1822, Pauline founded the Society for the Propagation of the Faith. She united the poor factory workers in prayer and collected from each one monthly, a modest sum of one sous to support the work of Catholic missionaries. She founded the Living Rosary Association in 1826, which grew rapidly in France and spread to other countries during her lifetime and for years thereafter. In 1832, Pope Gregory XVI gave canonical status to the Living Rosary Association.

== Related organizations today ==
- In 1986, the Universal Living Rosary Association was created by Patti and Richard Melvin of Dickinson, Texas, who based the Association on Jaricot's Petit Manual of the Living Rosary Association. The Association revived the practice of organizing 15 persons to each pray one of the 15 Decades of the Rosary.
- An additional interpretation of the Living Rosary involves several people praying the together with each individual representing a bead. This approach is sometimes used in parishes. In schools separate classes may lead each decade.
- The Guild of the Living Rosary of Our Lady and St. Dominic is a guild of intercession using the traditional rosary. It was founded in England in October 1905 by the Anglo-Catholic priest S.E. Serle. In the early years the guild suffered persecution for its practices, and was forbidden the use of churches. The guild is Anglican-based, but membership is open to any Christian. It is a ministry within the larger Society of Mary, an Anglican devotional society. Members are asked to pray just one decade of the rosary each day with a special intention. Intercession sheets with the intentions are distributed three times a year.
- The Living Rosary of Our Lady of Walsingham was established in 1962 by the Guardians of the Holy House of the Shrine of Our Lady of Walsingham (Anglican) as part of The Order of Our Lady of Walsingham. Each day the Rosary is said in the Shrine at 6 pm. The Shrine Church has fifteen altars, each dedicated to a Mystery of the rosary under the patronage of a particular saint.
