= Church of Notre Dame (New York City) =

Catholic church in Manhattan, New York

- Church of Notre Dame and Rectory
- U.S. National Register of Historic Places
- New York State Register of Historic Places
- New York City Landmark
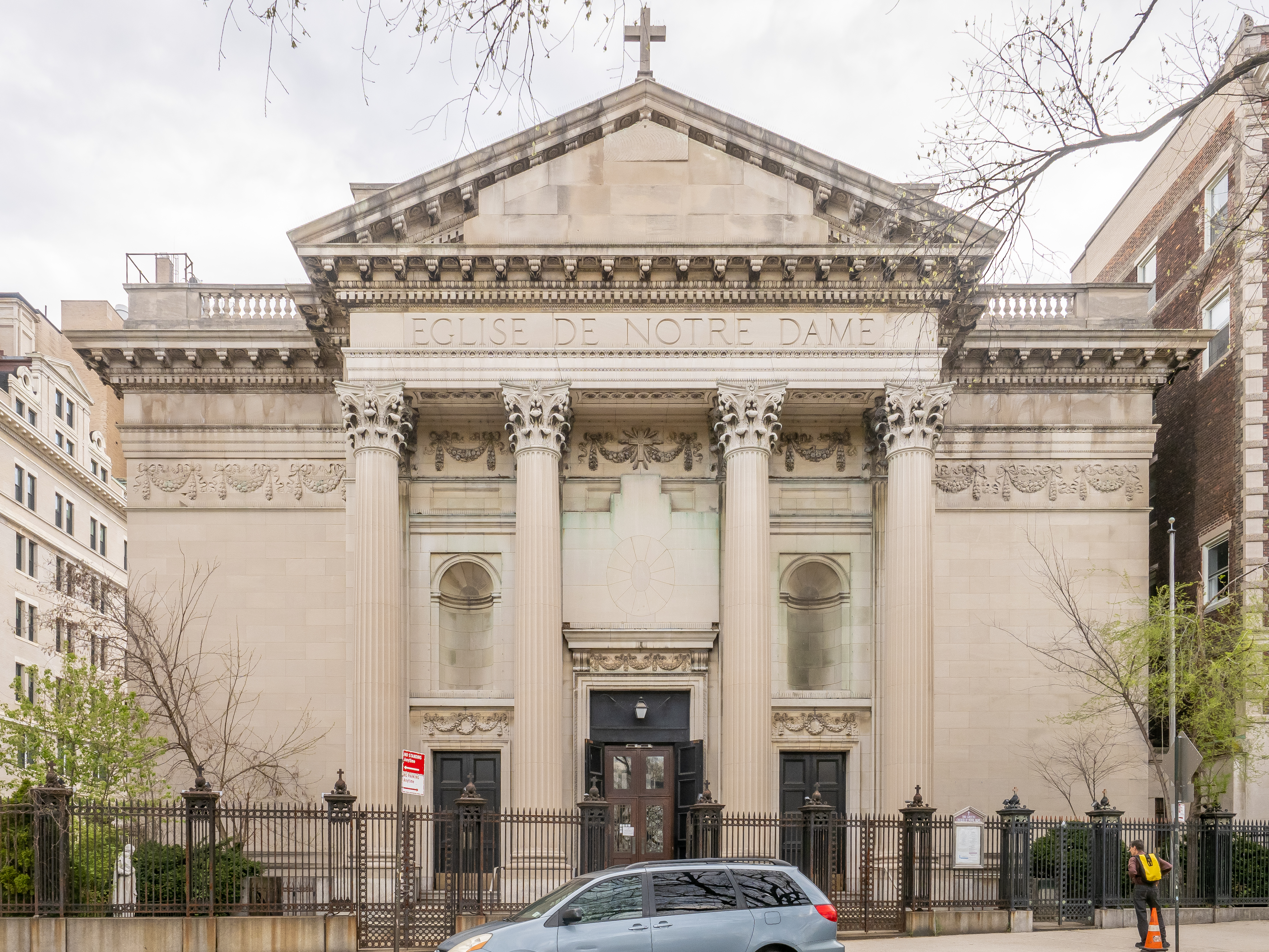
- Facade of the Church of Notre Dame

- Location within New York City Location within New York Location within the United States
- Location: 405 W. 114th St. and 40 Morningside Drive, New York, New York
- Coordinates: 40°48′18″N 73°57′38″W
- Built: 1909
- Architect: Daus & Otto; Cross & Cross
- Architectural style: French Neo-classical
- Website: Parish of Corpus Christi and Notre Dame
- NRHP reference No.: 80002678
- NYSRHP No.: 06101.000092
- NYCL No.: 0300 (main structure), 0301 (rectory)

Significant dates
- Added to NRHP: May 6, 1980
- Designated NYSRHP: June 23, 1980
- Designated NYCL: January 24, 1967

The Church of Notre Dame is a parish of the Roman Catholic Archdiocese of New York. The church is located at 40 Morningside Drive and the rectory at 405 West 114th Street in Morningside Heights, Manhattan, New York City. In 2022, the parish merged with nearby Corpus Christi Church.

== History ==
Fathers of Mercy, a French community of priests, established the Church of Notre Dame in 1910 as a mission of the St. Vincent de Paul Parish on West 23rd Street. The church had been established after Geraldyn Redmond donated funds to the Fathers of Mercy, requesting they build a chapel to propagate devotion to Our Lady of Lourdes. The first administrator of the parish was the Rev. Maurice Reynauld, S.P.M., who died in France during World War I. While in France in 1913, he affiliated Notre Dame Church with the Sanctuary of Our Lady in Lourdes, thus enabling worshipers at the Church of Notre Dame in New York City to obtain the spiritual benefits of worshipers at Lourdes. From the beginning of the parish, a special arrangement was made with the ecclesiastical authorities in Lourdes that water from the miraculous spring there would be sent directly to the Church of Notre Dame. Since that time Lourdes water has been continuously available at the church.

The sanctuary completed in 1910 was the work of Daus and Otto. Cross & Cross designed the nave, facade, and rectory completed in 1914. A planned dome was never completed. The expansion continued intermittently until completed 50 years later.

The chapel was officially dedicated on October 2, 1910, by Archbishop John Farley. Cardinal Farley dedicated the enlarged structure on February 11, 1915, the Feast of Our Lady of Lourdes.

Notre Dame became an independent parish in 1919 and grew from a small chapel to the present church in the late 1920s and early 1930s. It was still a center for New York's French community when Cardinal Charost of Rennes visited the church in June 1926 and when Bishop Alfred Baudrillart of the Institut Catholique de Paris presided at a ceremony in April 1927.

In 1936, an organization of lay parishioners, the Notre Dame Study Club, was the first group of its type to call upon every Catholic parish to support the Catholic Church in efforts to provide for social justice for black people.

In 1960, charge of Notre Dame was transferred from the Fathers of Mercy to the Archdiocese of New York.

In January 1967, the New York City Landmarks Preservation Commission designated the Church and the Rectory of Notre Dame as official city landmarks. The buildings were listed on the National Register of Historic Places on May 6, 1980.

In 1988, some parishioners sued under canon law to prevent the remodeling of the sanctuary, specifically relocating the altar in accordance with liturgical reforms established by Second Vatican Council.

== Notre Dame today ==
Over the years, the French community was integrated with other ethnic groups. Calling Notre Dame home are many people of Irish, German, Italian, Black, Hispanic and Filipino descent. Today Notre Dame is still just as ethnically diverse as its neighborhood.

In 2003, the Archdiocese of New York entrusted the Polish Province of the Dominican Order with the responsibility of taking care of Notre Dame Parish and all its ministries. Control returned to the archdiocese in the fall of 2011.

Catholic Campus Ministry at Columbia University became a part of the parish mission of Notre Dame in 1988. Notre Dame's community includes ministry at St. Luke's Hospital and the nearby Amsterdam Nursing Home, part of NewYork-Presbyterian Healthcare System.

The Church is also home to Columbia's Thomas Merton Institute for Catholic Life, which opened in 2023.
