= Raymond Jordan =

Raymond Jordan may refer to:

- Raymundus Jordanus (fl. c. 1381), medieval Catholic writer
- Raymond A. Jordan (1943–2022), American politician from Massachusetts
- Raymond E. Jordan (1895–1967), American politician, lieutenant governor of Rhode Island
- Rip Jordan (Raymond Willis Jordan, 1889–1960), pitcher in Major League Baseball
- Ray Jordan (born 1994), West Indies cricketer

== See also ==
- Ray Jordon (1937–2012), Australian cricketer
- Raimon Jordan (fl. c. 1178–1195), Toulousain troubadour
