= Pierre Toussaint =

Haitian-American philanthropist (1766–1853)

Venerable Pierre Toussaint
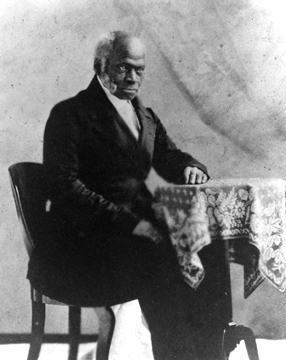
- Toussaint in the early 1850s
- Born: 27 June 1766; Saint-Marc, Artibonite, Saint-Domingue (now Haiti)
- Died: 30 June 1853 (aged 87); New York City, U.S.
- Spouse: Juliette Noel (m. 1811; died 1851)

Pierre Toussaint (French pronunciation: [pjɛʁ tusɛ̃]; June 27, 1766 – June 30, 1853) was a Haitian slave, hairdresser and philanthropist, brought to New York City by his masters in 1787. He was declared Venerable by Pope John Paul II in 1996.

Freed in 1807 after the death of his mistress, Pierre took the surname of "Toussaint" in honor of Toussaint Louverture, a leader of the Haitian Revolution. Toussaint also became a successful barber and used his wealth for various philanthropic causes. He also helped finance the construction of St. Patrick's Old Cathedral.

Credited as the de facto founder of Catholic Charities of New York, Toussaint is the first and only layman to be buried in the crypt below the main altar of the current St. Patrick's Cathedral on Fifth Avenue, generally reserved for bishops of the Roman Catholic Archdiocese of New York.

== Biography ==
=== Early life ===
Pierre was born into slavery on June 27, 1766 in the French colony of Saint-Domingue, present-day Haiti. He was the son of Ursule, also enslaved. His father's name is unknown. Pierre had a sister, Rosalie. His maternal grandmother, Zenobe Julien, was later emancipated. His maternal great-grandmother, Tonette, had been born in Africa and transported to Saint-Domingue.

The Toussaint family resided on the Artibonite plantation on the Artibonite River near the commune of Saint-Marc . The plantation was owned by the Pierre Bérard family; Ursule worked as a maid for Mrs. Bérard.

Raised as a Catholic, Pierre Toussaint was educated by the Bérard family's tutors and trained to work as a house slave. His responsibilities included greeting house guests and serving at meals. Pierre Bérard allowed Toussaint to read books in the family library; the boy improved his French by reading sermons and texts by Catholic authors.

Eventually Pierre Bérard and his wife retired to France, leaving their Haitian properties to their son, Jean Jacques Bérard and his wife, Marie Elizabeth Bérard. During the 1780s, political tensions increased in France, leading up to the French Revolution in 1789. At the same time, the mulatto and enslaved people of Saint-Domingue were becoming more restive and rebellious.

In 1787, Jean Jacques moved his family from Saint-Domingue New York City. Toussaint and his sister Rosalie were among the five enslave people who accompanied the Bérards. He would never see his mother or grandmother again.

=== Success as hair dresser ===
Upon the arrival of the Bérard family in New York City, Jean Jacques spent $50 to apprentice Toussaint to Marie Elizabeth's hairdresser. Jean Jacques allowed Toussaint to keep much of his earnings. In 1788, Jean Jacques returned to Saint-Domingue, only to discover that he had lost control of the Artibonite plantation. He died there of pleurisy.

After Jean Jacques' death, Marie Elizabeth Bérard learned that she was destitute. Having finished his apprenticeship, Toussaint had become a successful hairdresser among the elite White families of New York. His clients included female members of the Alexander Hamilton and Philip Jeremiah Schuyler. He provided his clients with the powdered and augmented coiffures of the French court as well as the newly popular chignons and face-framing curls favored by Americans.

Toussaint avoided unnecessary expenditures, accumulating wealth. He became the sole support for Marie Elizabeth during this time. Mary Schuyler, the wife of Philip Jeremiah Schuyler's, wrote about Toussaint's kindness towards Marie Elizabeth. She addressed him in letters as “my Saint Pierre”.

Catherine ("Kitty") Church Cruger would become one of Toussaints' key clients and friends. She was the daughter of John Barker Church and Angelica Schuyler. These mostly Protestant women admired Toussaint’s Catholic piety and kindness, and many corresponded with him. One of his clients described him as a having,

"...a good-tempered face, small earings and white teeth, a snowy apron attached to his shoulders and enveloping his tall figure."

New York in 1798 was hit with a yellow fever epidemic. Toussaint crossed barricades to nurse quarantined patients, working alongside the physician Richard Bayley

Marie Elizabeth in 1802 married Gabriel Nicholas, another French refugee from Saint-Domingue. This marriage released her from Toussaint's financial support. In 1807, a few weeks before her death, Marie Elizabeth emancipated Toussaint.

=== Emancipation and marriage ===
After becoming a free man, Toussaint named himself after Toussaint L’Ouverture, a rebellion leader in Saint-Domingue. Toussaint spent the next few years living in an apartment in the Nicolas home. He purchased Rosalie's freedom from Nicolas in May 1811, allowing her to marry the next week. The 45-year-old Toussaint in August 1811 married 25-year-old Mary Rose Juliette. She was also a former enslaved person from Saint-Domingue.

Due to connections among the French emigree community in New York, Toussaint met people who knew the Bérards in Paris. He began a correspondence with them that lasted several decades, particularly with Aurora Bérard, his godmother. Toussaint also corresponded with friends in what was now Haiti; his collected correspondence eventually filled 15 bound volumes.

When Rosalie died of tuberculosis, Toussaint and Juliette adopted her daughter Euphemia, providing for her education and music classes. In 1815, Nicolas and his wife moved to the American South. Two years later, Toussaint purchased a house on Reade Street in what is today the Tribeca section of Manhattan. As evidence of his wealth, he later bought a second house on Franklin Street in Tribeca. In 1819, Toussaint flirted with the idea of moving to Paris, France, but was dissuaded by his friends.

Toussaint was a member of St. Peter's Church in Lower Manhattan, the first Catholic church in the city. He attended daily mass there for 66 years in his own pew. This was at a time when African-American Catholics were forced to worship in the unfinished basements of Catholic churches.

=== Philanthropist ===
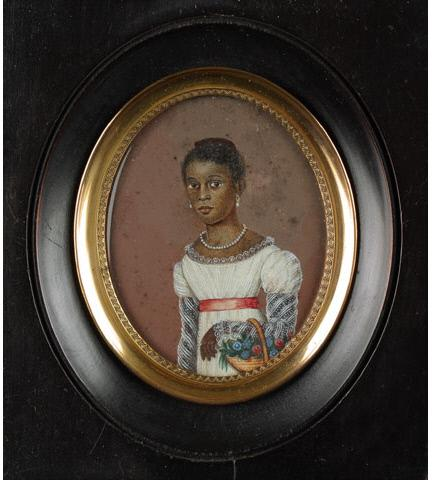
Euphemia Toussaint

Juliette Toussaint

The beginning of the Haitian Revolution in 1791 had plunged the French colony over the next 13 years into successive waves of slave insurgencies and foreign interventions by the Spanish and British. Many refugees, both white and black, fled the colony to New York City. Because Toussaint was fluent in French and English, he frequently helped the new immigrants. He often arranged charity sales of goods to help support these people.

The Diocese of New York in 1809 started construction of what is now called Old St. Patrick's Cathedral in present-day Nolita in Lower Manhattan. Toussaint helped raise funds for its construction.

In 1817, Mother Elizabeth Seton sent three members of the Sisters of Charity to New York to open St. Patrick’s Asylum, the first Catholic orphanage in that city. Toussaint raised funds for the orphanage, which was restricted to White children . Nineteen years later, the couple provided financial support and baked goods to the Colored Orphan Asylum in Midtown Manhattan, founded by the Quakers in 1836. The couple sheltered orphans at their Franklin Street house and fostered numerous boys in succession. Toussaint paid for them to become educated or learn a trade; he sometimes used his connection to help the orphans get their first jobs. He and Juliette organized a credit bureau, an employment agency, and a refuge for priests and needy travelers.

St. Vincent de Paul Church was opened in 1841 in Lower Manhattan by the Fathers of Mercy for French-speaking Catholics. The pastor was Annet Lafont, a French priest. Lafont insisted that both the church and its parish school be racially integrated, despite opposition from white parishioners. Toussaint was a strong supporter of Lafont and provided financial back to St. Vincent de Paul.

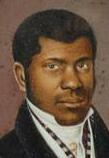
Pierre Toussaint (1825)

Despite his active support for schools and orphanages for African-Americans, Toussaint refused to participate in any political activism. The advent of abolitionism in the early 19th century only raised his concerns for political unrest.

=== Later years ===
The Toussaint's daughter Euphemia died of tuberculosis at a young. Juliette died on May 14, 1851. Two years later, Pierre Toussaint died on June 30, 1853, at age 87. William Quinn, the pastor of St. Peter's Church, eulogized Toussaint, called him “one who always had wise counsel for the rich and words of encouragement for the poor.” Eliza Hamilton Schuyler described Toussaint’s funeral:

“The body of the church was well filled with men, women, children, nuns, and charity sisters; likewise … people of his own color, all in mourning. Around stood many of the white race, with their eyes glistening with emotion.”

Toussaint was buried alongside Juliette and Euphemia in the cemetery of St. Patrick's Old Cathedral. In 1968, Toussaint's body was exhumed and examined as part of his canonization process. He was re-interred in the crypt of the new St Patrick's Cathedral in Midtown Manhattan. Toussaint is the only layman to be interred in that crypt.

== Veneration ==
In the 1950s, the John Boyle O'Reilly Committee for Interracial Justice, an Irish-American group devoted to social justice and equality, began researching and publicizing Toussaint's life story.

Cardinal Terence Cooke, then Archbishop of New York, authorized the formation of a committee to study the possible canonization of Toussaint. Based on their findings, in 1968 Cardinal John O'Connor strongly supported the opening of a beatification process for Toussaint, giving him the title of a Servant of God. In 1997, Toussaint was declared venerable by Pope John Paul II.

== Legacy ==
Established in 1983, the Pierre Toussaint Scholarship Fund of the Archdiocese of New York provides college scholarships to graduating high school seniors of diverse backgrounds from archdiocesan schools.

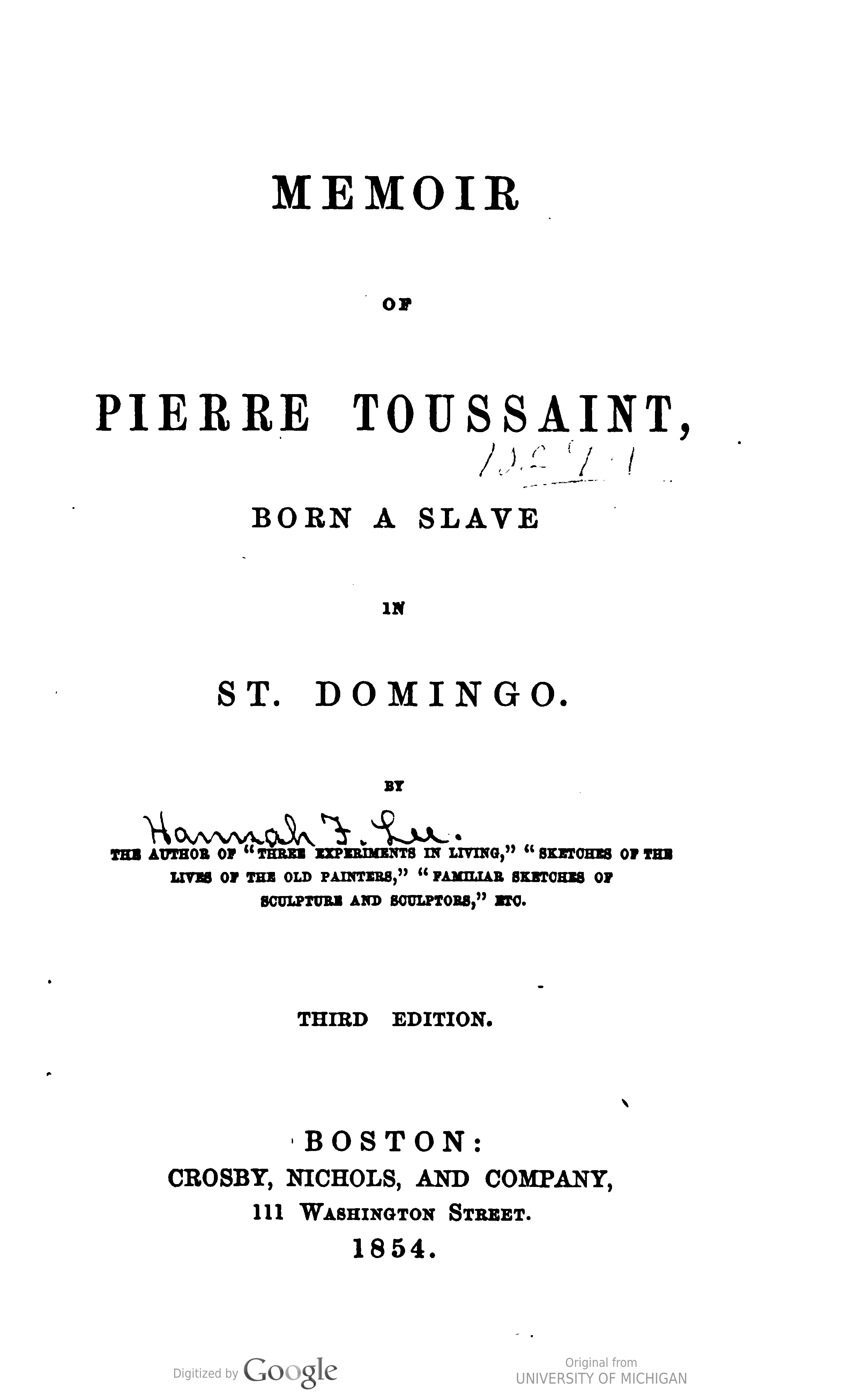
Title page of Toussaint's life story

In 2015, a collection of Toussaint portraits from the New York Historical Society was exhibited at Gracie Mansion, the mayoral residence in the Yorkville section of Manhattan.

=== Streets ===
- The intersection next to St. Peter's Church in Manhattan (1998)
- Pierre Toussaint Boulevard, a section of Church Avenue in Brooklyn, New York (2021)

=== Facilities ===
- Pierre Toussaint Leadership & Learning Center, Miami, Florida
- Toussaint Academy, San Diego, California (closed in 2011)
- Toussaint Hall, Sacred Heart University, Fairfield, Connecticut
- Toussaint Louverture Cultural Center of Massachusetts, Boston

== See also ==
- List of venerated Americans
