= Armand-Benjamin Caillau =

French Catholic priest, missionary and writer

Armand-Benjamin Caillau (22 October 1794 – 1850) was a French Catholic priest, a missionary and writer.

== Life ==
Caillau was born in Paris. Ordained in 1818, he was successively a member of the Missions de France, rector of Sainte-Geneviève (rue d'Enfer) and chaplain of the Infirmerie Marie-Thérèse (92 avenue Denfert-Rochereau). He joined, in 1834, the Fathers of Mercy, newly re-organized by Rauzan. His love of missionary life made him decline episcopal honours and a chair at the Sorbonne, but was no obstacle to his literary pursuits. He died in Paris in 1850.

== Works ==
Besides many contributions to the Bibliographie Catholique, Caillau wrote Instructions sur l'oraison mentale (Paris, 1833), a French translation of Tertullian's De Spectaculis (Paris, 1835), several monographs on Our Lady's Sanctuaries: Roc-Amadour (1834), Loretto (1843), N.D. de Puy (1846), Litanies du St. Nom de Jesus (Paris, 1845), Les nouveaux illuminés (Michel Vintras) (Orléans, 1849), etc.

He is best known, however, by the following works:

- Thesaurus Patrum (Paris, 1823-5), a patristic digest modelled on Merz's Thesaurus biblicus, with an introduction to patrology
- Collectio selecta Patrum (Paris 1829-1842), 133 octavo volumes, undertaken in collaboration with Marie Nicolas Sylvestre Guillon and suspended at the announcement of Jacques-Paul Migne's "Patrology". The insertion of new sermons under the name of Augustine of Hippo (P.L., XLVII) brought about a controversy between the two editors.
- Histoire de la Vie des Saints (Paris 1835-1840), four octavo volumes, and also (Paris 1863) five octavo volumes, written in collaboration with Louis Juste
- S. Gregorii Nazianzeni opera (Paris, 1842), two folio volumes (also P.G., XXVII and XXVIII), an edition, partly from the manuscript notes of D. Clémencet, reviewed by Abel-François Villemain in the Journal des Savants (1845 and 1847) Rhetorica Patrum (Paris, 1838), three volumes never completed.

A similar project of a Bibliotheca Mariana resulted only in the publication of a few opuscula of Ephrem the Syrian, Bonaventure, Idiota (Jordan), and the Marial monographs noticed above. Caillau also re-edited Merz's Thesaurus biblicus (1822), L'Année sainte (1826), vols. III and IV of D. Ceillier's Histoire des auteurs sacrés (1838-9); and Lettres de Scheffmacher (1839).

== Sources ==
- Delaporte, Vie du P. Rauzan (Paris, 1857); Bibliographie catholique, X;
