= Jean-Baptiste Rauzan =

French Catholic priest

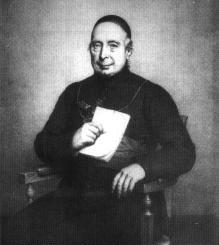
- Title: French Catholic Priest

Personal life
- Born: December 5, 1757 Bordeaux, France
- Died: September 5, 1847 (aged 89) Paris, France
- Education: University of Bordeaux (Doctor of Theology)

Religious life
- Religion: Roman Catholic

Jean-Baptiste Rauzan (December 5, 1757 - September 5, 1847) was a French Catholic priest known for founding the Fathers of Mercy.

== Life ==
=== Early life ===
Jean-Baptiste Rauzan was born at Bordeaux the eldest of seven children born to a well-to-do family. His father practiced law.

Rauzan began to study law, but soon entered the seminary run by the Vincentians. He was ordained a priest May 25, 1782. Two years later, he obtained the degree of Doctor of Theology from the University of Bordeaux. He then taught philosophy at the College of Guienne. He was assigned to the parish of Saint Projet, and taught for a time at the seminary of St. Raphael before returning to parish work.

During the French Revolution, he escaped to England, where he tended to the French Catholic refugees in London. In 1793, he went to Belgium. He had by now acquired a reputation as an effective preacher. With the arrival of the Revolutionary Army, he moved to Germany, eventually settling in Berlin. Much of his time was devoted to spiritual direction.

After the Revolution, he returned to France and took up residence in Paris, where he often preached at Notre-Dame-des-Champs and taught catechism. In 1802, Charles-François d'Aviau Du Bois de Sanzay, the newly installed Archbishop of Bordeaux, appointed Rauzan to a supervisory position. Among his duties was to survey parishes in and around the city and report on their condition, most of had suffered greatly. In 1804, he preached the Lenten services in Paris.

=== Missions in France ===
On the recommendation of d'Aviau, Cardinal Fesch, Archbishop of Lyons, asked Rauzan to form an association of priests to preach parish missions. Among those who joined him was Armand-Benjamin Caillau. the Missionaries of France were so successful they won the support of Napoleon who gave them funds to defray expenses in conducting the missions. However, as the Emperor's relations with the Papacy cooled, the association of missionaries was suppressed.

In 1814, at the suggestion of Fesch, Rauzan revived the group. He was joined by Charles Auguste Marie Joseph, Count of Forbin-Janson, Vicar-General of the Diocese of Chambéry and others. The organization was based at Mont-Valérien, in the Parisian suburb of Suresnes. Rauzan founded the Congregation of the Sisters of St. Clotilde for the education of young ladies.

In 1830, during the second Revolution, the Missionaries of France were dispersed and exiled and their house in Paris sacked. Rauzan went to Rome, where he was received by Pope Gregory XVI, who authorized him to found a new society, to be known as the Fathers of Mercy. The papal brief of approbation, which also contains the constitutions, was given 18 February 1834.

In 1839, at the suggestion of Archbishop John Hughes of New York, Forbin-Janson introduced the Fathers of Mercy into the United States. Ferdinand Bach, the first superior in America, became the rector of the St. Louis Cathedral in New Orleans. Correspondence between Bach and Rauzan is on file in the archives of the University of Notre Dame.

Rauzan died in Paris, 5 September 1847.

== Sources ==
- Delaporte, Albert, Vie du très-révérend père Jean-Baptiste Rauzan..., Paris : J. Lecoffre et cie, 1857.
