= St. Vincent de Paul Church (Manhattan) =

Church in New York City

Parish of St. Vincent de Paul
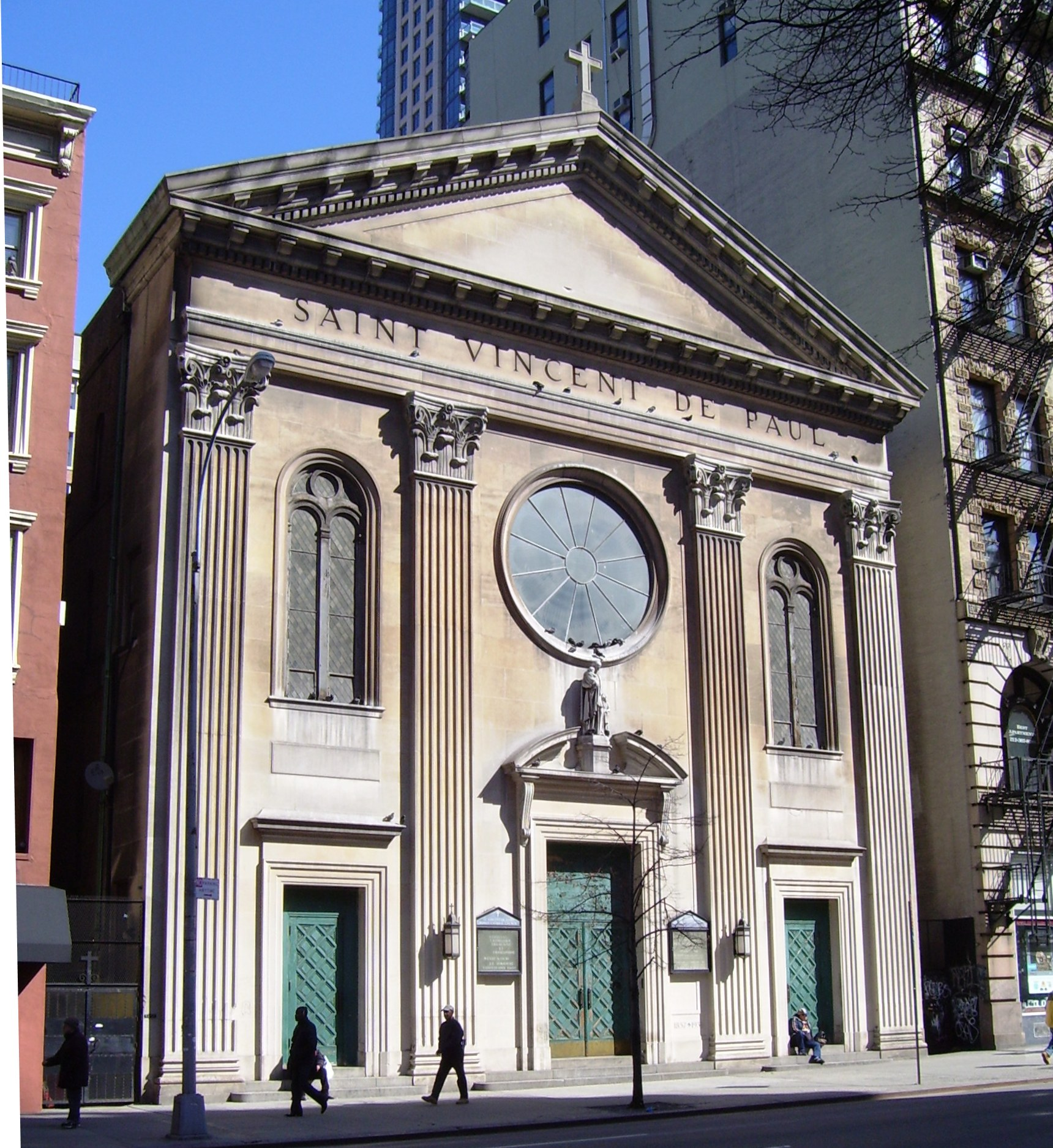
- Parish of St. Vincent de Paul
- 40°44′37″N 73°59′37″W
- Location: 123 West 23rd Street, New York, New York 10011
- Country: United States
- Denomination: Roman Catholic

History
- Founded: 1841
- Founder(s): Bishop Charles Auguste Marie Joseph, Count of Forbin-Janson, S.P.M.
- Dedication: St. Vincent de Paul
- Dedicated: 1841 (first church), 1869 (current church)

Architecture
- Functional status: closed
- Architect(s): Henry Engelbert, Anthony J. DePace (facade)
- Style: Romanesque Revival, Classical Revival (facade)
- Completed: 1841 (first church), 1869 (current church), 1939 (facade)
- Construction cost: $15,000 (1841); $100,000 (1869)
- Closed: January 6, 2013

Specifications
- Capacity: 1,000 people

Administration
- Archdiocese: New York

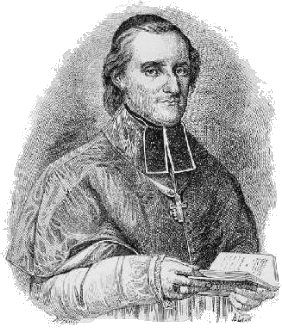
Bishop Charles Forbin-Janson, S.P.M.

St. Vincent de Paul Church was a national parish of the Archdiocese of New York for Francophone Catholics in Lower Manhattan. Named for Vincent de Paul and founded in 1841, the church was located at 123 West 23rd Street and first staffed by the Fathers of Mercy. It was closed in January 2013.

== History ==
=== Origins ===
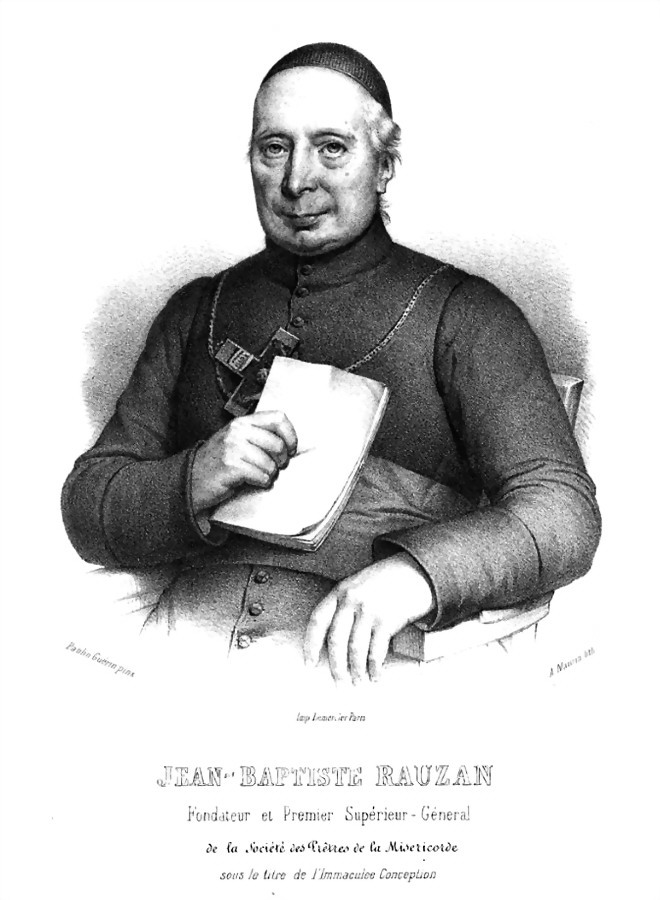
Abbé Jean-Baptiste Rauzan, the founder of the Fathers of Mercy

The Catholic Church in France had been devastated by the social upheavals of the French Revolution. Much of the population was in deep economic misery, and the level of religious knowledge, after the destruction of church institutions which had been built up over centuries, was dismal. A strong need was felt for a re-evangelization of the nation. In 1808 the Society of the Fathers of Mercy were founded by the Abbé Jean-Baptiste Rauzan in Lyon in response to this need. They formed bands of Catholic priests who would go from door to door, if needed, to invite people to the parish missions which they would preach. Through these, they worked to give the French people knowledge and help them commit to their traditional Catholic faith.

Given their experience in working with populations who had lost touch with the institutions of the Catholic faith, several Catholic bishops in the United States invited the members of the society to come as missionaries to the nation, then a vast mission territory. In October 1839, one of the founders of the Society, Charles Auguste Marie Joseph, Count of Forbin-Janson, the exiled Bishop of Nancy in France, arrived in New York City to start a nationwide preaching tour for which he had been authorized by Pope Gregory XVI. Finding no place of worship for the French-speaking people of the city, he learned that the French-speaking population was starting to attend services in the Protestant Huguenot churches, as they were conducted in French. In his sermon in French in a Mass he celebrated at St. Peter's Church, he challenged the French Catholic community of the city to establish a French-speaking church. (Prior to 1964 only the sermon and announcements were in the vernacular language.) To help in the endeavor, he contributed $6,500 from his own vast wealth to start the construction of the church.

Property was acquired on the northwest corner of Canal Street and Broadway. Forbin-Janson returned to the city on various occasions during his mission to check on the progress of the building. Meanwhile, with the help of another significant donation from his personal funds, the Fathers of Mercy acquired the newly founded Spring Hill College from the Diocese of Mobile in Alabama. With this, the Society established itself in the United States.

=== The parish ===
Two years later, John Hughes, the Archbishop of New York, invited the Fathers of Mercy to come from Alabama to his diocese to serve the French-speaking immigrants who were flocking to the city, in the church built by the French bishop. The parish was opened in 1841, with the church being dedicated by Forbin-Janson before he sailed back to France on December 8 of that year. The first pastor appointed by Hughes was Fr Annet Lafont, CPM.

Lafont was an energetic and dedicated pastor. In addition to his parochial duties, he founded the Orphanage of St. Vincent de Paul, with sites in both New York City and Tarrytown, as well as homes for the elderly and residences for the young single women who came to the city seeking work. What is now known as Manhattan University developed from his parish school, through his bringing the first Brothers of the Christian Schools from France to teach in the United States.

Lafont was also a strong supporter of the rights of the African-American community of the city, who suffered discrimination even from the few Catholic churches then open. Services at the Church of St. Vincent de Paul were integrated from the start, as was the parish school, the first in the Northern States to teach students regardless of race. When the European families threatened to withdraw their children from the school as a result of his policies, Lafont brought the black children into his own residence to teach them himself. In this he had the financial support of Pierre Toussaint. He was a native of Haiti who had been brought to the United States as a slave and had amassed great wealth as a hairdresser. He used his wealth for education and philanthropy, and he is now being considered for canonization by the Catholic Church. Lafont also organized the St. Ann Society, the first mission to African Americans in New York. Through the society, the families were given weekly religious instruction classes in the basement of the church.

=== Chelsea ===
Around 1856 the parish made the decision to move to the Chelsea neighborhood of the city, where many French residents had settled, drawn there by the developing industrialization in the area. Property was acquired and Henry Engelbert was commissioned to build a new church. The construction was interrupted by the Civil War, but the new church was completed and dedicated in 1869. The presence of the church helped to establish the neighborhood as a hub of French presence in the city, drawing a number of institutions to the area, such as the former French Hospital.

In 1910 a large bequest was left to the parish to build the Church of Notre Dame, located in the Morningside Heights neighborhood of the borough, in order to promote devotion to Our Lady of Lourdes. The new church was a mission church of the parish.

After World War I, the Memorial to French and American Veterans was built in the church in memory of the members of the Lafayette Squadron and other Americans who had died fighting for France. On June 6, 1944 more than one thousand French exiles and French soldiers attended the noon mass at St. Vincent de Paul Church NYC to pray for victory as Allied troops began the liberation of France from Nazi occupation. Photographs of the D-Day noon mass at St. Vincent de Paul and the many French exiles and French soldiers who attended the mass may be viewed at Flashbak.com Photos Of New Yorkers After Learning About The D-Day Invasion – June 6, 1944 https://flashbak.com/photos-of-new-yorkers-after-learning-about-the-d-day-invasion-june-6-1944-381282/ The church was re-dedicated after World War II, with President Charles de Gaulle of France present.

=== Later years and closure ===
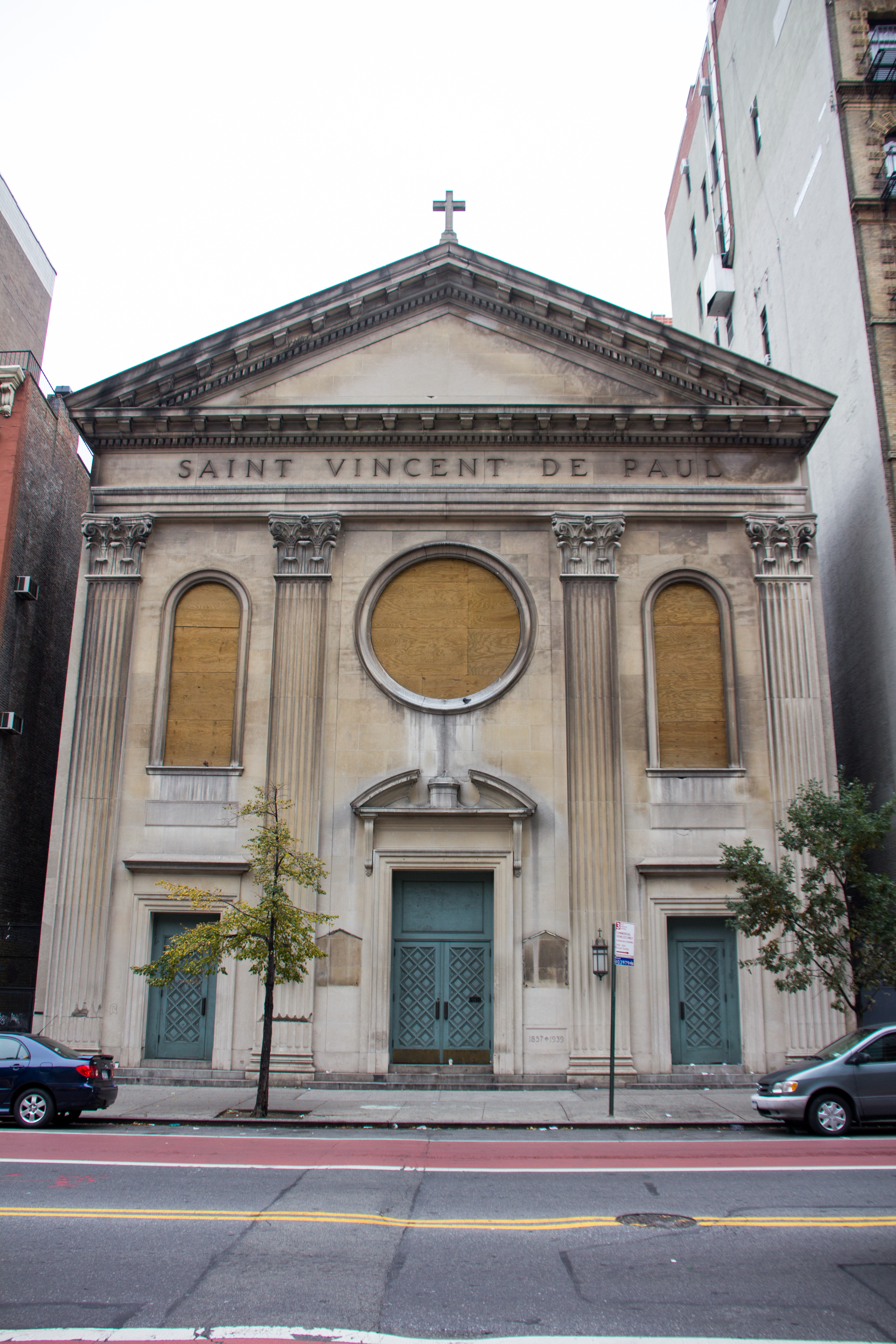
The boarded-up church in 2017

The Fathers of Mercy withdrew from the parish in 1960, transferring administration to the Archdiocese of New York. The parish maintained a weekly Mass in French since its founding, serving an array of immigrants to the city from various French-speaking countries of the world, representing some 65 nations. Since the late 20th century, most of these immigrants have been from Western African nations.

In 2006, preservationists and others who wished to preserve the church applied for landmark status for the church, seeking to protect it from redevelopment. The group organized as a nonprofit group, Save St. Vincent de Paul. In 2007, however, the Archdiocese of New York began to express an interest in closing the parish. The effort to save the parish received the support of President Nicolas Sarkozy of France, who wrote directly to both Cardinal Timothy M. Dolan, the Archbishop of New York, and to Michael Bloomberg, the mayor of New York City, to express the French's government's interest in preserving the church. Assemblyman Richard N. Gottfried, publicly supported the application.

However, by 2012 the New York City Landmarks Preservation Commission determined that the application did not merit a formal public hearing, with a spokeswoman saying: "Our decision not to recommend its designation to the full commission was based on a careful review of the building's architectural and historical qualities. We found that the existing facade, a neo-Classical facade that replaced the original Romanesque Revival facade in 1939, was designed by a little-known architect and lacked architectural distinction."

In August 2011, stormwater from Tropical Storm Irene breached the church's roof; because of the planned closure, the Archdiocese of New York did not repair the damage to the church, prompting a renewed preservationist push.

The church closed in 2013, although former parishioners, many Francophone, retain an attachment to the church building. Parishioners unsuccessfully challenged the Archdiocese of New York's decision to close the church through the Catholic Church's canon law system. In January 2016, the Apostolic Signatura in Rome, the highest Vatican court, issued its final decision declining to consider the parishioners' appeal.

The church sustained damage in a bombing on 23rd Street in September 2016; "its center rose-shaped, stained-glass window was blown out and two other stained-glass panels were damaged" in the explosion. The property was subsequently sold in 2016. The site is planned to be redeveloped as a mixed-use tower; space for the congregation is planned to be incorporated into the new structure.

== Notable events ==
St. Vincent de Paul Parish served as a center of French culture from its founding. In addition to providing social services to immigrants from both Europe and Africa, it has been a notable cultural center for the French-speaking. Examples are:

- The Funeral Mass of the famed French opera singer, Armand Castelmary (1834-1897), who had died onstage at the Metropolitan Opera House on February 10, 1897;
- The funeral of Louis Keller, the publisher of the New York Social Register, in February 1922;
- The wedding of Edith Piaf, with Marlene Dietrich as her maid of honor, on September 20, 1952.
