= Charles Auguste Marie Joseph, Count of Forbin-Janson =

French aristocrat and prelate

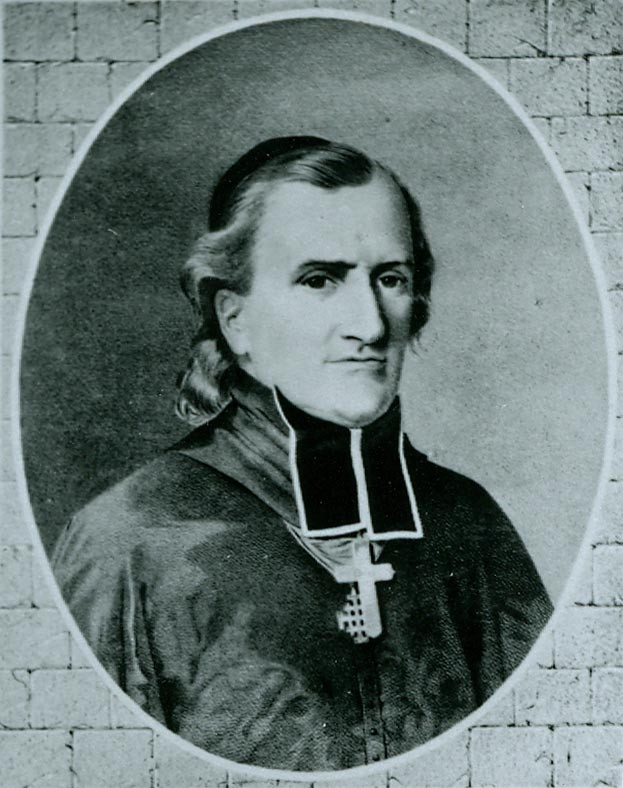
Bishop Charles-Auguste-Marie-Joseph de Forbin-Janson

Charles-Auguste-Marie-Joseph, Count of Forbin-Janson, C.P.M. (3 November 1785 – 12 July 1844), was a French aristocrat and prelate who was a founder of the Fathers of Mercy, established in an effort to re-evangelize the French people. He preached throughout North America, taking an active role in reviving the Catholic populations of the United States and Canada. He was influential in establishing an ultramontane stand in the Catholic Church in French-speaking Canada, an influence which would last for generations.

Forbin-Janson also served as the Bishop of Nancy and Toul, and later was the founder of the Association of the Holy Childhood, which worked to support the Catholic Church in its work on the expanding frontiers of North America.

== Life ==
=== Early life ===
Born in Paris, he was the second son of Count Michel-Palamède de Forbin-Janson and of his wife, Cornélie-Henriette-Sophie-Louise-Hortense-Gabrielle, Princess of Galéan. He was a Knight of Malta from childhood. During the French Revolution, his family took refuge in Bavaria, which was his home until he returned to France in 1800, having been trained for a military career. Though he was to remain an ardent monarchist throughout his life, he accepted the appointment which Napoleon Bonaparte gave him as an Auditor of the Council of State in 1805. His family and the aristocracy looked forward to a most brilliant career as a statesman for him, but at the same time he joined the Congregation of the Holy Virgin (French: Congrégation de la Sainte-Vierge), a religious association of the laity organized in Paris in 1801, which had grown out of the Jesuit-affiliated Sodality of Our Lady after the Suppression of the Society of Jesus.

In the spring of 1808 Forbin-Janson surprised all by entering the Seminary of Saint-Sulpice. Because of the hostilities instigated by Napoleon against Pope Pius VII he had given up his career in government and decided to become a priest. There he met a group of young seminarians at Saint-Sulpice who were caught up in the idea of missionary work, and the impetuous Forbin-Janson became imbued with this vision. He became close friends with Eugène de Mazenod, who entertained similar dreams, and who was later to found the missionary order of the Oblates of Mary Immaculate.

Forbin-Janson was ordained a priest in Chambéry, Savoie, on 15 December 1811, by Irénée-Yves Desolle, Bishop of Chambéry. and was made Superior of the seminary of the diocese. Nevertheless, he still determined to become a missionary. Later, in 1814, while serving as the acting Vicar General of the diocese, he traveled to Rome where Pope Pius VII advised him to remain in France where missionary work was needed. He immediately heeded the advice, and, with his friend, the Abbé Jean-Baptiste Rauzan, re-established the Missionaries of France, later called the Society of the Fathers of Mercy, based at Mont-Valérien, in the Parisian suburb of Suresnes.

=== Missionary life ===
The Fathers of Mercy established the practice of visiting the homes of a town in which they had established themselves in order to draw the people to services of preaching on the Catholic faith. This practice met with great success in all parts of France. The climax of one such mission was the raising of a Calvary on Mont Valérien. Forbin-Janson had a great attachment to the huge cross, which was visible from Paris, and became a favorite place of pilgrimage for the people of the city. He paid for both its construction and its later maintenance out of his own considerable wealth.

In 1817 Forbin-Janson was sent to Syria on a mission, returned to France in 1819, and again took up the work of a missionary in his homeland until 1823 when he was appointed Bishop of Nancy and Toul and Primate of Lorraine, for which he was consecrated at the chapel of the Society on Mont-Valérien on 6 June 1824 by Gustave Maximilien Juste de Croÿ-Solre, the Archbishop of Rouen. A co-consecrator was Jean-Louis Lefebvre de Cheverus, for many years the Bishop of Boston, then the Bishop of Montauban. Also present at the consecration was the American Bishop of Cincinnati, John Baptist Purcell.

As a steadfast monarchist, Forbin-Janson became associated with the policies of King Charles X of France. That stand and his authoritarian manner of ruling caused him to be unpopular with both the people and clergy of his diocese. In the course of the Revolution of July 1830, when King Charles was overthrown, rioters attacked and ransacked both the bishop's palace and the local seminary. His beloved cross on Mont-Valérian was also destroyed during this upheaval. Seen as a problem by the new government of King Louis Philippe for his views and his refusal to sign the Declaration of the Clergy of France of 1682 which was rejected by the Holy See, he was not allowed to return to his diocese. He succeeded, however, in getting his own choice of a coadjutor bishop by threatening to return to Nancy.

Once Forbin-Janson was freed of his duties as a bishop, he began to travel around the country, accepting invitations to preach from various bishops and religious houses. He became known as a generous benefactor of missionary activity. He aided Pauline Jaricot in the establishment of the Society for the Propagation of the Faith, which had been founded to aid missionaries in the United States, as a result of which, his thoughts turned to North America. He was, in fact, receiving a steady stream of invitations from compatriots holding episcopal office there. He went to Rome, where Pope Gregory XVI supported his vision and gave him an official mandate for a missionary tour through the United States of America.

==== America ====
Forbin-Janson arrived in New York on 18 October 1839. Though he did not stay in that city long, while there, he realized that there was no place of worship specifically for French speakers. To answer this need, he commissioned the construction of the Church of St. Vincent de Paul there. He made periodic visits to the city to check on its progress. During the next two years there, he traveled around the country, giving missions to the people and retreats to the clergy. All the large cities of the country, from New York City to Dubuque; from New Orleans to Quebec City, were to become witnesses of his zeal. New Orleans was the first conspicuous field of his success, as he preached the traditional sermons for Lent in the cathedral there. As would become the pattern of his mission, the preaching ended with the founding of a temperance society as a collective social commitment. In a letter to a friend he later noted that their success "exceeded all expectations," despite his apprehensions. While on his way there, from his own personal funds he contributed one-third of the money with which the Fathers of Mercy bought Spring Hill College (later a Jesuit institution) near Mobile, Alabama, thereby establishing their presence in the country. Forbin-Janson then attended the Fourth Provincial Council of Baltimore, held May 1840, where the Council Fathers granted him a right to vote.

Forbin-Janson then traveled to Quebec, where he was more at home due to his mother tongue being spoken there. He gave his first sermon on Sunday, 6 September 1840, in the cathedral. There followed a two-week retreat with 5,000–6,000 participants regularly attending the daily sermons, each about an hour and a half long. His stirring eloquence brought about a religious revival which in a traditionally Catholic society which was facing apathy and competition from French-speaking Swiss Huguenots, who had begun to preach in the colony. As a victim of both the French Revolution and the July Revolution, which had had an influence on the Rebellions of 1837 in Lower Canada, the French bishop, just by his very presence, reinforced in people's minds an apprehension of the misfortunes such upheavals produced. Some of his biographers have judged that, as an intransigent reactionary, he would prepare the way for the ultramontane clericalism that Ignace Bourget, the Bishop of Montreal would use to full advantage in both the religious and the political spheres. Further, some events regarded as supernatural kept his memory alive for many years among the French-Canadian people.

The high point of Forbin-Janson's apostolate in Lower Canada was the raising of an immense cross on Mont Saint-Hilaire that was a counterpart to the one on Mont-Valérien which had been destroyed. Standing nearly 100 feet (30 meters) high and 30 feet (9.1 meters) wide, it was lit through openings, and people could climb rungs to the top. The cross was inaugurated and blessed with an elaborate ceremony on 6 October 1841. It served as a landmark and place of pilgrimage until it was destroyed by a storm in 1846, after which it was replaced by a chapel, which stood another 30 years on the site.

Forbin-Janson's last visit in the United States was to Philadelphia, in November 1841, where he assisted at the consecration of Peter Richard Kenrick as coadjutor bishop of the Diocese of St. Louis.

=== Final years ===
Forbin-Janson left New York for France in December 1841, and the next year traveled to Rome to give an account of his mission in America. Pope Gregory named him a Roman Count and Assistant at the Pontifical Throne "because of his wonderful zeal for the propagation and defense of the Catholic Faith in the United States of America". The pope, however, declined to intervene on his behalf with the French government, and, despite a request, the bishop refused to resign.

In August 1842 Forbin-Janson went to London to intervene with Lord Stanley, the Secretary of State for War and the Colonies, on behalf of the Canadian rebels. On his return to France he wanted to start a project intended to interest Christian children in Europe in the fate of children in China. He presented the idea to the Society for the Propagation of the Faith, but there was no interest in expanding its mission in that direction. Consequently, in 1843 he founded the Society of the Holy Childhood, and spent that, and a part of the following year, in spreading this good work through France, Belgium and England.

Forbin-Janson died unexpectedly at his family castle of Les Aygalades, now part of the city of Marseille. He was buried in the Picpus Cemetery in Paris, in a section reserved for aristocracy who had been killed during the French Revolution.

== Sources ==
- De Rivière, Vie de Mgr de Forbin-Janson, Missionnaire, évêque de Nancy et de Toul, primat de Lorraine, fondateur de la Ste Enfance (Paris, 1892)
- Maes, Life of Bishop de Forbin-Janson in America, Manuscripts
- Shea, Hist. of Cath. Ch. in U.S. (New York, 1904).
