= Juliette Toussaint =

Haitian-American philanthropist

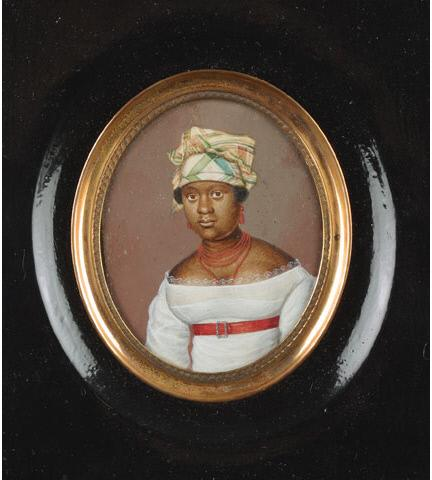
- Painting by Anthony Meucci (c. 1825)
- Born: Marie-Rose Juliette Noel c. 1786; Saint-Domingue (now Haiti)
- Died: May 14, 1851 (aged 64–65); New York City, United States
- Spouse: Pierre Toussaint

Juliette Noel Toussaint (c. 1786 – May 14, 1851) was a formerly enslaved Haitian-American philanthropist who collaborated closely with her husband Pierre Toussaint in helping the poor and doing charitable works in downtown New York. Her husband was declared a Venerable in 1996 by Pope John Paul II.

Her name is listed among the donors of the New York African Society for Mutual Relief.

== Life ==
=== Early life ===
Little is known about Juliette's early life. She was born into slavery in the former French colony of Haiti in the year 1786. The Noel family came to Baltimore with their slave owners at some point during the Haitian Revolution. There she labored as a housemaid, assistant cook and nanny.

=== Marriage and family ===
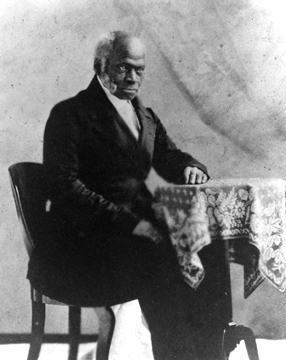
Photograph of Pierre Toussaint.

In the wake of the Haitian Revolution, Pierre Toussaint's master went into exile in New York City with him, granting them the opportunity to meet one another. Juliette was 20 years younger than him. While still working for her master, Pierre saved enough money to purchase her freedom. They were married privately on August 5, 1811. For four years, they boarded at the house of Pierre's master before finally settling on Franklin Street. Pierre worked as a hairdresser while Juliette focused on household needs and volunteered for the local church activities.

They adopted Euphemia, the daughter of Pierre's late sister Rosalie, who had died of tuberculosis, raising the girl as their own. They provided for her education and music classes.

=== Philanthropy ===
The couple attended daily masses and began a career of charity for New Yorkers experiencing poverty regardless of color and creed. They often brought baked goods to the children of the Colored Orphan Asylum and donated money to its operations. They sheltered and fostered numerous street children, travelers, and homeless people in their own house.

Together, the Toussaints organized a credit bureau, an employment agency, and a refuge for priests. Many Haitian refugees went to them, and they helped them find jobs. They often arranged sales of goods so they could raise money to live on. With the Oblate Sisters of Providence, they established a school for Black children.

They also helped raise money to build a new Roman Catholic church in New York, which became Old St. Patrick's Cathedral on Mott Street. Pierre was also a benefactor of the first New York City Catholic school for Black children at St. Vincent de Paul on Canal Street.

=== Later years ===
On May 14, 1851, Juliette died of natural causes. Two years later, Pierre Toussaint died on June 30, 1853. They were buried alongside Euphemia in the cemetery of St. Patrick's Old Cathedral.
