= Pauline Jaricot =

19th-century French tertiary of the Order of Dominicans, foundress and blessed

Blessed Pauline Jaricot TOSD
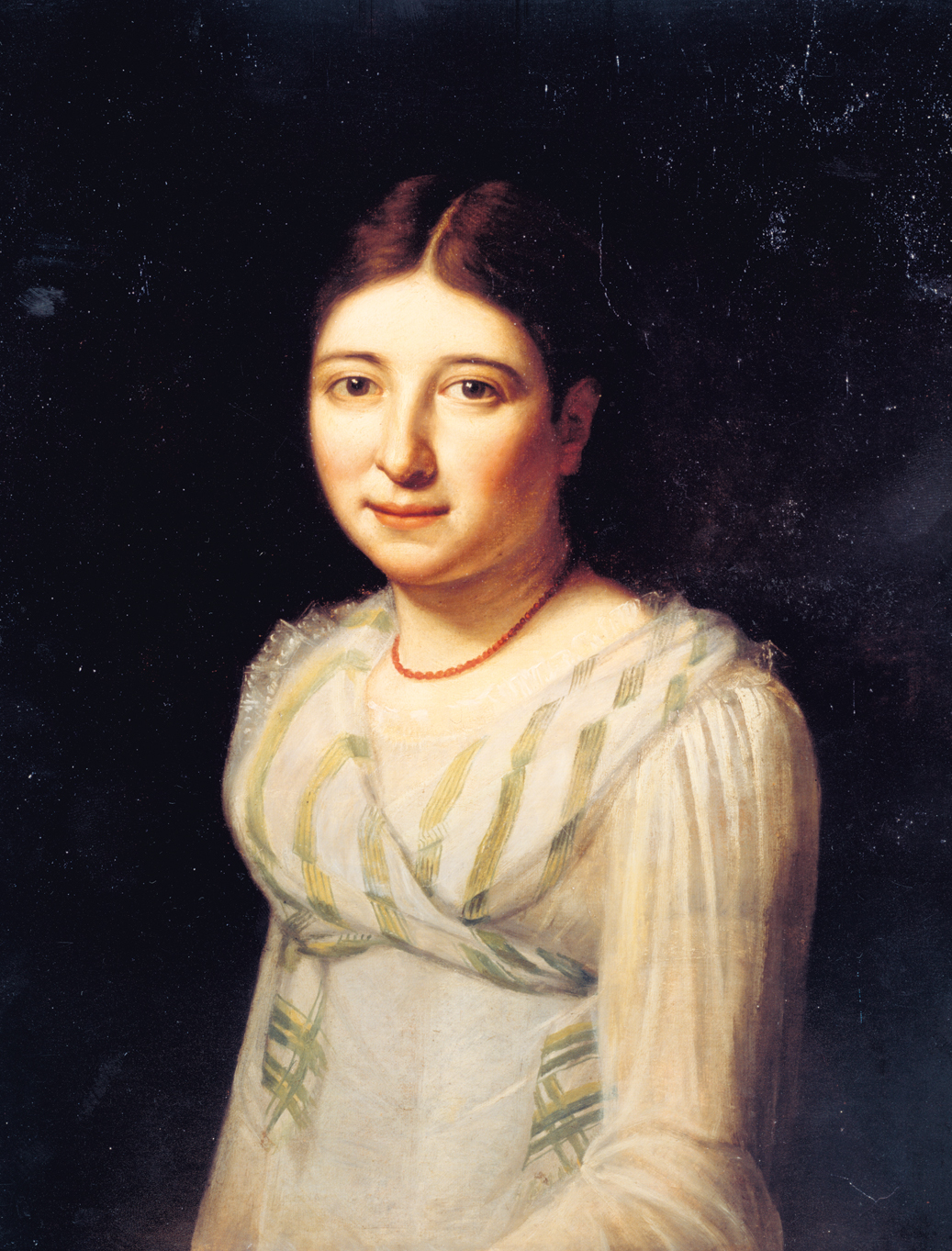
- Portrait of Pauline Jaricot

Virgin
- Born: Pauline Marie Jaricot; 22 July 1799; Lyon, France
- Died: 9 January 1862 (aged 62); Lyon, France
- Venerated in: Catholic Church
- Beatified: 22 May 2022, Eurexpo, Lyon, France by Cardinal Luis Antonio Tagle (on behalf of Pope Francis)
- Major shrine: Saint-Nizier Church, Lyon, France
- Feast: 9 January
- Patronage: Association of the Living Rosary; Society of the Propagation of the Faith

Pauline Marie Jaricot (22 July 1799 – 9 January 1862) was a French member of the Third Order of Saint Dominic. She also was the founder of the Society of the Propagation of the Faith and the Association of the Living Rosary. Pope John XXIII ratified the first step of her beatification process, declaring her venerable. On 26 May 2020, Pope Francis recognized a miracle attributed to her intercession as the final requirement for beatification. The ceremony was celebrated on 22 May 2022 in Lyon by Cardinal Luis Antonio Tagle.

== Life ==
Pauline Jaricot was born in Lyon, France, on 22 July 1799, the youngest of seven children of Antoine and Jeanne Jaricot. Her father owned a silk factory in Lyon. Her brother, Philéas, was a missionary in Quangnam. At fifteen years of age Pauline was introduced into the social life of the city. Subsequently, a sermon on vanity made a deep impression on her.

At the age of seventeen, a serious fall left her with nerve damage which affected her movement and speech. Then her mother and older brother died. Jaricot isolated herself while her health continued to deteriorate. Her condition, now thought to be Sydenham's chorea, slowly improved. She began to lead a life of intense prayer, and on Christmas Day, 1816, took a vow of perpetual virginity. She established a union of prayer among pious servant girls, the members of which were known as the "Réparatrices du Sacré-Coeur de Jésus-Christ".

Pauline went on to become a pioneer of organized support for Catholic missionary work. Along with women employed in the silk factory run by her sister and brother-in-law, she resolved to help the missions with prayers and a small weekly contribution of one penny a week from each participant. The seed grew and other groups joined to help all missions. This eventually led to the founding in 1822 of the Society for the Propagation of the Faith, dedicated to supporting missionary efforts worldwide. On May 3, 1922 Pope Pius XI declared the Society for the Propagation of the Faith "Pontifical".

Pauline's spiritual director for many years, was the priest Saint John Vianney. In 1822, she arranged for the printing and distribution of religious literature, convinced that information about the missions should be publicized. Later, the future Society would publish the Annales, a periodical which contained reports from various mission territories aimed at increasing interest in the Society and in the missions.

Afflicted by a serious illness, Pauline travelled on pilgrimage to Mungano, in Italy. There, on 10 August 1835 she was healed, and was convinced that she owed this recovery to the intercession of Saint Philomena.

Around 1845 Pauline purchased a blast furnace plant which she intended to be run as a model of Christian social reform. A building adjacent to the plant accommodated the families, and close by was a school and a chapel. However, she left the management to people who proved to be dishonest, and in 1862 she was forced to declare bankruptcy. Having exhausted all her money, she spent the rest of her life destitute. She died on January 9, 1862, in Lyon.

== Veneration ==
Pauline Jaricot's spiritual writings were examined in Rome and approved by a commission of theologians on 27 May 1925. This led to the cause for her beatification to be formally opened on 18 January 1930, when she was granted the title of Servant of God.

Since 1935 Pauline Jaricot's mortal remains lie in the Church of Saint-Nizier in Lyon. In a homily on 9 January 2013, at the end of the celebrations commemorating the 150th anniversary of her death, Cardinal Fernando Filoni, prefect of the Congregation for the Evangelization of Peoples, said that her "heroic virtues do not consist in a series of miraculous events, but in that fruitful fidelity to Christ, to whom she devoted herself both in good times and in … difficult … moments"

On 26 May 2020, Pope Francis authorized the Congregation for the Causes of Saints to promulgate a decree recognizing a miracle attributed to Pauline Jaricot's intercession, the final requirement for beatification. Her beatification was celebrated with solemnity on 22 May 2022 in the Eurexpo stadium, Lyon, with Cardinal Luis Antonio Tagle presiding on the Pope's behalf.

== The Association of the Living Rosary ==
In 1826 Pauline Jaricot had founded the Association of the Living Rosary. The fifteen decades of the rosary were divided among fifteen associates, each of whom had to recite daily only one determined decade. She expanded the organization's work to include the distribution of prayer leaflets, holy pictures, medals and rosaries. The Association of the Living Rosary grew rapidly in France and spread to other countries during her lifetime and for years thereafter. In 1832, Pope Gregory XVI granted it canonical approval.

Despite fluctuations over the years in different parts of the world, in 2014 the membership of the Association of the Living Rosary numbered nearly 16 million persons of all ages, with substantial numbers in Third World countries. The organization maintains an internet website at philomena.org, authored by Patti Dickinson, who is universal director of the Living Rosary. A Facebook page, Universal Living Rosary Association, is authored by apostolate promoter Brian J. Costello of New Roads, Louisiana.

In the United States, the number of members had markedly decreased by the mid-20th century, but the organization was revived through the efforts of Patti and Richard Melvin of Dickinson, Texas, and 28 other devotees who renewed the practice of organizing 15 persons to each pray one of the 15 Decades of the rosary.
