= Johann Jakob Scheffmacher =

Johann Jakob Scheffmacher (27 April 1668 – 18 August 1733) was an Alsatian Jesuit theologian.

== Life ==
Scheffmacher was born at Kientzheim, Alsace. In 1715, while teaching theology in the Catholic University of Strasburg, he was appointed to the chair of apologetics, founded in the cathedral of that city by Louis XIV. He was rector of the university (1728–31). He died, aged 64, at Strasbourg.

== Works ==
His best-known writings are in the form of letters, with the aim of setting forth points of Catholic doctrine to Protestants. These letters have been collected in two separate volumes and published under the titles: "Lettres d'un Docteur Allemand", 14th ed. (Strasburg, 1789), "Lettres d'un Théologien", 13th ed. (Strasburg, 1750).

Another well-known work of the author is "Controverskatechismus (Cologne, 1723) which was later published under the title, "Licht in den Finsternissen". The oldest known French edition of this work entitled "Catéchisme de Controverse" is dated Strasburg, 1751, though it is not certain whether the book was originally published in French or in German. There is an English translation entitled, "A Controversial Catechism" (Baltimore). A new German edition was published at Strasburg in 1892.
