= Society for the Propagation of the Faith =

Catholic mission agency

The Society for the Propagation of the Faith (Latin: Propagandum Fidei) is an international association coordinating assistance for Catholic missionary priests, brothers, and nuns in mission areas. The society was founded in Lyon, France, in 1822, by Pauline Jaricot. It is the oldest of four Pontifical Mission Societies of the Catholic Church.

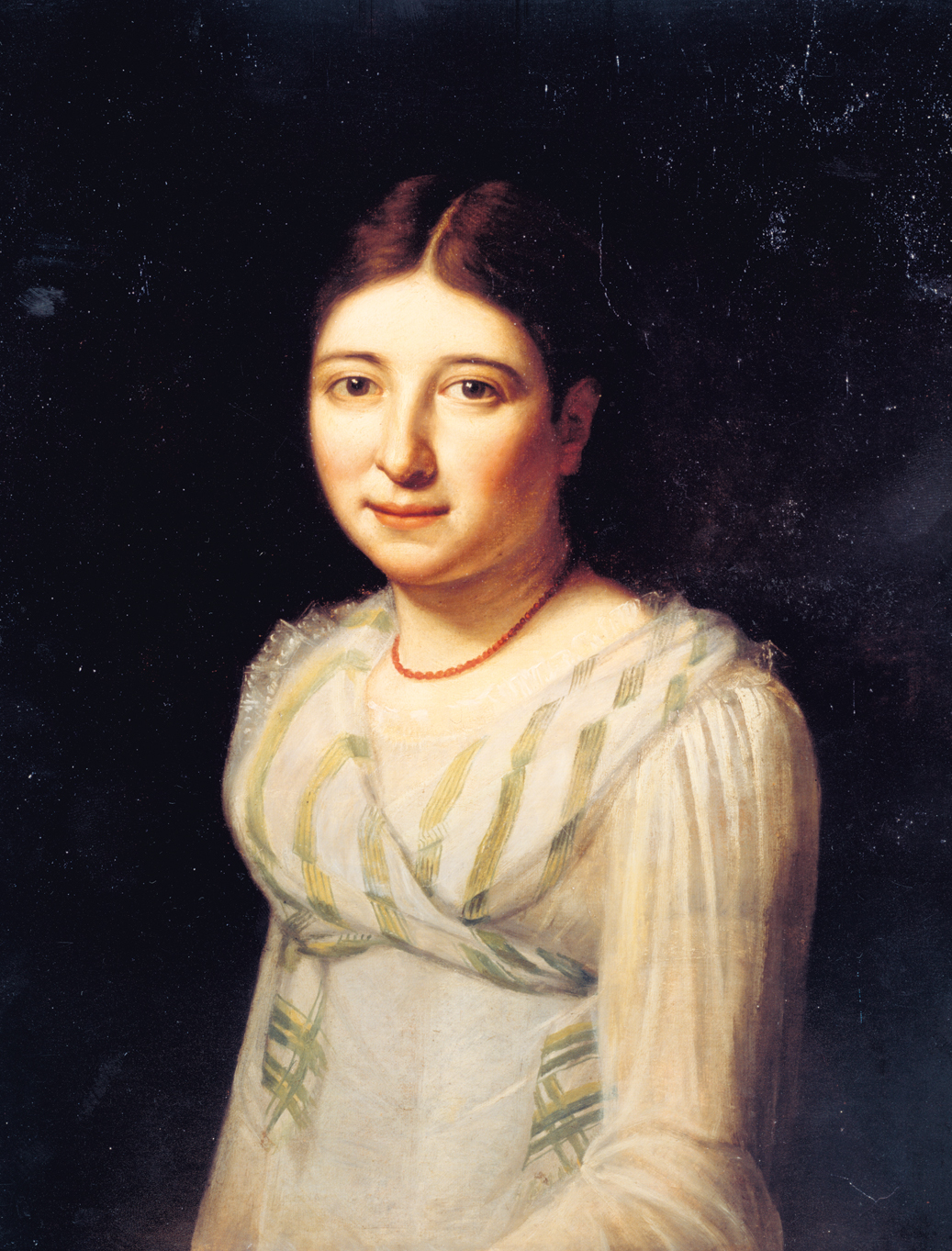
Pauline Jaricot, foundress of the Society of the Propagation of the Faith.

== Origin and development ==
In 1815, Bishop Louis William Valentine Dubourg of New Orleans, Louisiana was in Lyon collecting alms for his diocese, which was in a precarious condition. To a Mrs. Petit, whom he had known in the United States, he expressed the idea of founding a charitable association for the support of Louisiana missions, which suggestion she cordially embraced, but could procure only small alms among her friends and acquaintances.

Separately, in 1820, Pauline Jaricot of Lyon received a letter from her brother, a student at the Seminary of St. Sulpice, in which he described the extreme poverty of the members of the Paris Foreign Missions Society. She conceived the idea of forming an association whose members would contribute one cent a week for the missions. The membership rose to a thousand and the offerings were sent to Asia.

In 1822, Father Inglesi, Vicar-General of New Orleans, was sent to Lyon by Bishop Dubourg to visit his benefactors and reanimate their zeal. Seeing the success of Miss Jaricot, they thought at first of establishing a similar society for American missions, but decided to unite, instead of dividing, efforts. A meeting of the friends of the missions called by Father Inglesi was attended by twelve ecclesiastics and laymen, and on 3 May 1822, the Society for the Propagation of the Faith was formally established, with a declared mission to help Catholic missionaries by prayers and alms. The very first collection of the Propagation of the Faith in 1822 supported the vast Diocese of Louisiana and the Two Floridas in the United States, which then extended from the Florida to Canada, as well as the missions in China. Pope Leo XIII designated Jaricot as the official founder of the society.

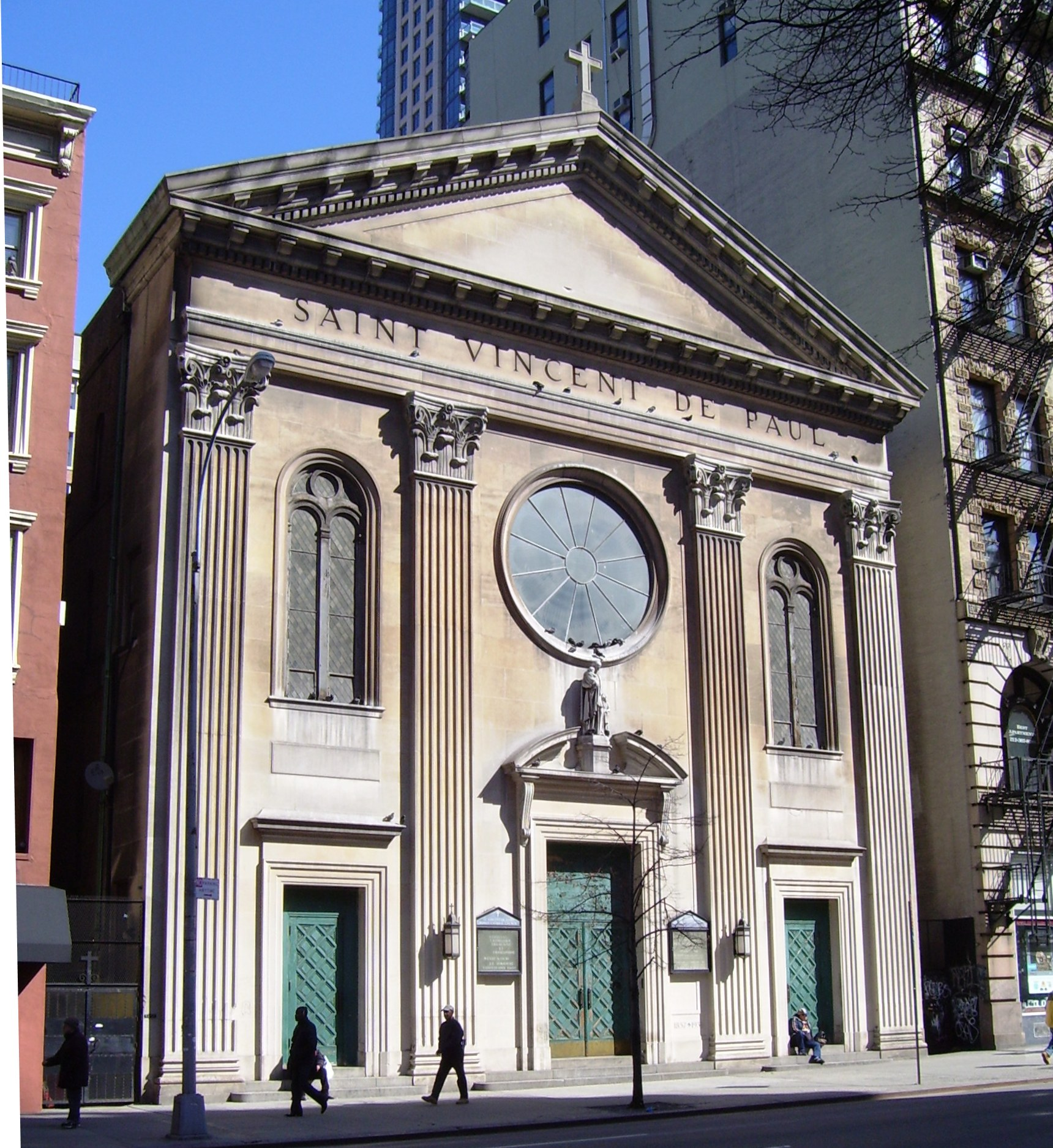
St. Vincent de Paul Church, Canal Street

The society's goal was to support missions worldwide, which excluded majority-Catholic countries like France, Italy, Austria, Spain, and Portugal. As soon as missions are able to exist by their own efforts the society discontinues its aid, because demands are many and resources inadequate. In 1827, The Diocese of New York received its first grant of $1,776.00. In 1842, the Church of St. Vincent de Paul, on Canal Street, a parish for French-speaking residents, was built with money received from the Propagation. In 1853 St. Vincent de Paul became the location of the first chapter of the Society in New York.

In 1823, a delegate was sent to Rome and the group received the blessing of Pope Pius VII. In 1840, Gregory XVI placed the society in the rank of Universal Catholic institutions, and on 25 March 1904, in the first year of his pontificate, Pius X recommended it to the charity of all the faithful, praising its work, and raising the feast of its patron saint, Francis Xavier, to a higher rite. A large number of provincial and national councils (especially the third of the Plenary Councils of Baltimore, 1884), as well as thousands of bishops from all parts of the world, have likewise enacted decrees and published letters in favour of its development. It receives contributions from all parts of the Christian world.

== Apostolate ==
Pontifical status was granted to the Society on May 3, 1922 and its central administration was transferred to Rome. In 1926, Pope Pius XI established an annual collection for the missionary work of the Church called "World Mission Sunday". World Mission Sunday is organized by the Society for the Propagation of the Faith. The Society is under the direction of the Dicastery for Evangelization. The national office for the Society for the Propagation of the Faith in the United States is located in New York.

The Society for the Propagation of the Faith concentrates its efforts to communities in Africa, Asia, the Pacific Islands, and remote area of Latin America. It provides financial support to mission bishops for day-to-day expenses and special projects. It supports pastoral and evangelizing programs, catechists and catechetical work, the building of churches and chapels, the work of Religious communities in health care and education, and for communication and transportation needs.

Allocations are based on the reports of the superiors of the missions, bishops, vicars and prefects Apostolic; and in consideration of the desires of the pope. It is a law of the society to make its affairs public, and each year an integral account of all money received, all appropriations made, and all expenditures is published in the "Annals". All money received is distributed each year to more than 1,100 mission dioceses and vicariates around the world. There is no permanent endowment.

The society also publishes MISSION Magazine, formerly Mission Today.

=== England and Wales ===
The society works in England and Wales with the Mill Hill Missionary Society. Mill Hill was one of the first societies to introduce lay missionaries; and its priests, lay brothers and associates work in 27 countries on every inhabited continent.

In England and Wales the society provides distinctive red boxes for the collection of donations for the missions.

== Notable members ==
- Fulton J. Sheen
