= Raymundus Jordanus =

Christian writer also known as Idiota

Raymundus Jordanus (fl. c. 1381), best known by his Latin pseudonym Idiota ('the Idiot'), though this identification is disputed by some, was a medieval Catholic writer whose identity remained unknown for some centuries.

== Biography and identity ==
The pseudonym "idiot" need not be understood in the ordinary sense as now used. According to the original Greek, idiota means private (also as a soldier), simple, or peculiar, and it is probable that the writer in question employed it in this sense to signify that he was a person of no consequence.

Théophile Raynaud discovered that Raymundus Jordanus was the author of the works found in the library of the Church Fathers under the name Idiota. In his preface to one of the works of Idiota, the Oculus Mysticus, which he published in 1641, he accounts for this discovery by the testimony of idiotic writers, and by the fact that some of the original manuscripts had been signed by Raymundus. Biographical writers have, in general, accepted Raynaud's theory since 1654, when, under his editorship, a complete edition of the works of Idiota was published in Paris under the name of Raymundus Jordanus.

It is known for certain that this Raymundus was a Frenchman, a Canon Regular of St. Augustine, prior of the house of his order at Uzès, in southern France, and afterwards Abbot of Selles-sur-Cher, France where he lived and died. Selles, it appears, was not then a Cistercian monastery. Raymundus wrote about the year 1381. In an account of a transaction between the Canons Regular and the Bishop of Uzès in the year 1377, Raymundus is styled licentiate, and it is stated that he was elected by the chapter of his order to present and conduct its cause before an ecclesiastical tribunal presided over by Cardinal Sabinensi, which he did with ability and success.

== Writings ==
There is however no question as to the works themselves. They were all written in Latin, and have been translated at least to Dutch in 1535, and to Spanish by 1550 In the edition of his works published in Paris in the year 1654 we have the following collection: — six books of "Meditations"; a "Treatise on the Blessed Virgin"; a "Treatise on the Religious Life"; and the "Spiritual or Mystical Eye". He wrote also a "Commentary on Psalm xv". His book of "Meditations" contains six chapters:

1. De amore divino
2. De Virgine Maria
3. De vera patientia
4. De continuo conflictu carnis et animæ
5. De innocentia perdita
6. De morte

These meditations were published in Paris in 1519, and the volume is said to have been the work of a pious and holy man who gave no other name than Idiota. The Catholic Encyclopedia describes their style as "simple, clear and pure."

These works soon became widely known, although the author remained unknown. They have all been printed several times in the "Bibliotheca Patrum", and the "Contemplationes de amore divino" are often found in small manuals bound up with the meditations of St. Augustine, St. Bernard and St. Anselm. In the "Magna Bibliotheca Veterum Patrum" published in 1618, Idiota's works are given among the writers of the tenth century and, according to Cardinal Bellarmine, Idiota flourished about the year 902.
