= Fathers of Mercy =

Roman Catholic religious congregation

- Congregation of the Priests of Mercy
- Congregatio Presbyterorum a Misericordia
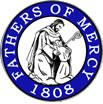
- Badge of the Fathers of Mercy
- Abbreviation: CPM
- Formation: 1808; 218 years ago
- Founder: Jean-Baptiste Rauzan, CPM
- Founded at: Lyon, France
- Type: Clerical religious congregation of pontifical right for men
- Headquarters: 806 Shaker Museum Road, Auburn, Kentucky, USA
- Members: 26 members as of 2021
- Superior General: David Wilton, CPM
- Parent organization: Roman Catholic Church
- Website: fathersofmercy.com
- Formerly called: Missionaries of France (1808–1834); Fathers of Mercy (1934–1961)

The Fathers of Mercy, formally known as the Congregation of the Priests of Mercy (Latin: Congregatio Presbyterorum a Misericordia; abbreviated CPM), is a Catholic religious congregation of pontifical right of missionary priests founded by Jean-Baptiste Rauzan in early 19th-century France.

== History ==
=== Foundation ===
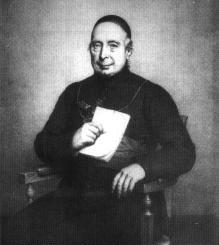
Jean-Baptiste Rauzan, founder of the Fathers of Mercy

The founder, Jean-Baptiste Rauzan, was born at Bordeaux on 5 December 1757. After completing his ecclesiastical studies, he taught theology and sacred eloquence and later was chosen Vicar-General of Bordeaux where he inaugurated a missionary movement. The institute was established at Lyon, France, in 1808.

After preaching in the Diocese of Troyes the institute received from the Government of Emperor Napoleon I, unsolicited subsidies to defray the expenses of their missions. However, following Napoleon's dispute with Pope Pius VII, the society, called the Missionaries of France, was suppressed.

In 1814, at the suggestion of Cardinal Fesch, a Generalate for the community was established in Paris where the priests were placed in charge of several parishes. Rauzan and his colleagues were joined by the young Vicar-General of Chambéry, de Forbin-Janson, afterwards Bishop of Nancy; Denis-Luc Frayssinous, who founded St. Stanislaus College and instructed the young missionaries in sacred eloquence; Legris Duval, Le Vasseur, Armand-Benjamin Caillau and Carboy.

They evangelized the French cities of Orléans, Poitiers, Tours, Rennes, Marseille, Toulon, Paris and other places, and established the Works of St. Geneviève and the Association of the Ladies of Providence in many parts of France. Rauzan founded the Congregation of the Sisters of St. Clotilde for the education of young ladies. The royal family assisted him financially and gave him Mount Valerian, at that time the center of piety, and later one of the principal forts protecting the capital.

In 1830, during the second Revolution, the Missionaries of France were dispersed and exiled and their house in Paris sacked. Rauzan went to Rome, where he was received by Pope Gregory XVI, who authorized him to found a new society, to be known as the Society of the Fathers of Mercy (S.P.M.). The Papal Brief of approbation, which also contains the constitutions, was given 18 February 1834, and on 15 March of the same year a second Brief, affiliating the new society to the Propaganda Fide, and the former Missionaries of France accepted these constitutions on 8 December 1835. Rauzan died in Paris, 5 September 1847.

Its members included Faillet, Bishop of Orléans; Alfred Duquesnay, Archbishop of Cambrai; Victor-Felix Bernadou, Archbishop of Sens, who later became a cardinal. The Fathers of Mercy resumed their missionary activities in France. When all religious societies were subject to the decree of expulsion in 1880, they claimed the enforcement of the authorization given to the society by the restored Bourbon king Louis XVIII in 1816 and retained their mother-house in Paris until the separation of the Church and State in 1905, when they moved to Belgium.

=== America ===
In 1839, at the suggestion of Bishop Hughes of New York, Forbin-Janson introduced the Fathers of Mercy into the United States, initially in the Diocese of New Orleans. Ferdinand Bach, the first superior in America, became the Rector of the Cathedral of St. Louis in New Orleans where he died tending victims of yellow fever. (Correspondence between Bach and the motherhouse in Paris is on file in the archives of the University of Notre Dame.)

Bishop Potiers of Mobile, Alabama, then invited them to take charge of Spring Hill College. Two years later, Lafont and Aubril were sent to look after the increasing French population in New York City, where the Fathers of Mercy took charge of the parishes of St. Vincent de Paul, Manhattan, and of Our Lady of Lourdes and St. Frances de Chantal, Brooklyn. They also set up houses of studies in Rome, Belgium, France and other places. By a decree of Propaganda in August 1906, Theophile Wucher was named Vicar General of the Institute for three years and took up residence in New York.

The Fathers of Mercy staffed St. John the Evangelist Parish in Green Bay from 1888 to 1891. They returned to Green Bay in 2011 to staff the National Shrine of Our Lady of Good Help.

== 21st century ==
The Generalate is in Auburn, Kentucky; St. Joseph's Novitiate is located in South Union. Novices attend classes at Mount St. Mary's Seminary in Cincinnati. The habit of the congregation is the black Roman cassock.

Their primary apostolate is preaching parish missions and conducting retreats throughout the United States, Canada and Australia. They are active in the Archdiocese of Louisville and the dioceses of Green Bay and Owensboro.

They staff a couple of small, rural parishes in the Archdiocese of Louisville. "The Fathers of Mercy Hour" is broadcast on a number of Catholic radio outlets. Retreat conferences are made available on CDs.

== The Community Chapel of Divine Mercy ==
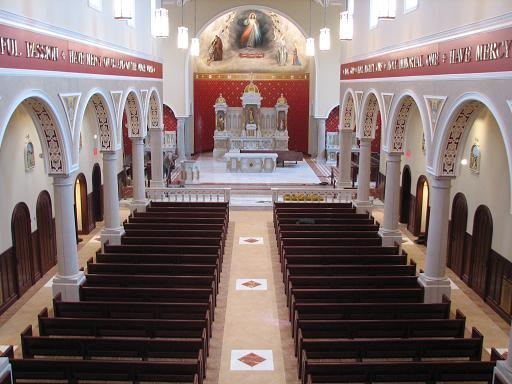
A view of the sanctuary and nave from the choir loft in the Chapel of Divine Mercy near the end of construction

In the spring of 2006 the Fathers of Mercy began construction of the Chapel of Divine Mercy. This chapel took over 2 years to complete construction and in August 2008 was consecrated by John Jeremiah McRaith, and opened to the public.

== Missionaries of Saint John the Baptist ==
The "Missionaries of Saint John the Baptist" is a Public Association of the Faithful recognized in the Roman Catholic Diocese of Covington. It was founded by two former members of the Fathers of Mercy with the aim of establishing a new religious Institute of diocesan right which celebrates the liturgy according to the 1962 Roman Missal. The association operates Our Lady of Lourdes parish in Park Hills, Kentucky. The Association was suppressed by the local Bishop. Now it no longer functions as a Public Association of the Faithful but instead as a normal local parish.
