= Chronological list of saints in the 10th century =

A list of people, who died during the 10th century, who have received recognition as Blessed or Saint in a Christian church

== Timeline ==
Name	Birth	Birthplace	Death	Place of death	Notes	Historical status	Reference
Beorhthelm of Shaftesbury							
Antony Kauleas			901				
Grimbald			903			Dubious	
Gerald of Aurillac	855		909				
Demetrian			912		Bishop of Khytri		
Blessed Notker Balbulus			912				
Plegmund			914				
Tutilo			915				
Clement of Okhrida			916				
Anne (Susanna)	840		918				
Betto			918		Bishop of Auxerre		
Radbod			918		Bishop of Utrecht		
Ludmila	860		921				
Athelm			923				
Ansurius (Isauri)			925				
Pelagius (Pelayo)	912		925				
Wiborada	861		926				
Berno			927				
Hugh of Anzy le Duc			930				
Forannan			932		Bishop of Domhnach-Mor		
Frithestan			933		Bishop of Winchester		
Beornstan of Winchester			934		Bishop of Winchester		
Wenceslaus	907		935				
Elfleda			936				
Gennadius of Astorga (Genistus)			936		Bishop of Astorga		
Unni (Huno, Unni, Unno)			936		Archbishop of Bremen-Hamburg		
Lucidius			938				
Adegrin			940				
Guy of Baume			940				
Liberalis			940		Bishop of Embrun		
Blessed Benno			940				
Hermogius			942				
Odo of Cluny	879		942				
Ælfgifu of Shaftesbury (Elgiva), (Aelgyfa)			944				
Luke the Younger (Luke Thaumaturgus)			946				
Maurus			946		Bishop of Cesena		
Rachilidis			946				
Pelagius			950				
Victor			950				
Vincent			950				
Alphege the Elder (Elphege)			951		Bishop of Winchester		
Basil the Younger			952		Possibly died in 944.		
Blessed Ratho			953				
Thiento, abbot and martyr, and 6 Companions			955				
Paul of Latros			956				
Blessed Eberhard			958				
Arsenius			959		Bishop of Corfu		
Gerard of Brogne (Gerard Miles)			959				
Oda of Canterbury			959				
Edbert			960				
Edburga of Winchester			960				
Reinold			960				
Guibert			962				
Mundus (Mund, Munde)			962				
Aymard of Cluny			965	Cluny, France			
Bruno the Great of Cologne	925		965				
Gorman			965		Bishop of Schleswig		
Englatius (Englat, Tanglen)			966		Bishop of Tarves		
Raynerius			967				
Matilda (Mathilda, Maud)	895		968				
Olga of Kiev			969				
Merewenna (Merwenna, Merwinna)			970				
Ulrich of Augsburg			973		Bishop of Augsburg		
John of Gorze			974				
Conrad of Constance			975		Bishop of Constance		
Edgar the Peaceful			975				
Turketil			975				
Cadroe (Cadroel)			976				
Anastasius XVIII			977				
Rudesind (Rosendo)			977		Bishop of Compostela		
Edward			978		King of the English		
Geroldus (Gerold)			978				
Maccallin			978				
Abraham of Alexandria		Syria	979	Alexandria	Coptic Pope		
Liafdag			980		Bishop of Jutland		
Elstan			981		Bishop of Winchester		
Amaswinthus			982				
Eutropius			982		Bishop of Saintes		
Senorina			982				
Ludoiph			983				
Edith of Wilton	962		984				
Ethelwold			984				
Bobo (Beuvon)			985				
Minnborinus of Cologne			986				
Sandratus			986				
Wiltrudis			986				
Peter Urseolus (Orseolo)	928		987				
Dunchaid O'Braoin			988				
Dunstan	910		988				
Oswald of Worcester			992		Archbishop of York		
Gerard of Toul	935		994		Bishop of Toul		
Majolus of Cluny	906	Avignon, France	994	Souvigny, France	Abbot of Cluny		
Wolfgang	930		994		Bishop of Regensburg		
Gebhard			995		Bishop of Constance		
Victor			995				
Adalbert of Prague	956		997				
Adelaide	931		999				
Leo of Nonantula			1000				
Peter Martinez			1000				
Robert of Syracuse			1000				
Virila			1000				
Wulfthryth of Wilton			1000				

== See also ==
- Christianity in the 10th century
- List of Anglo-Saxon saints
