= Christianity in the 10th century =

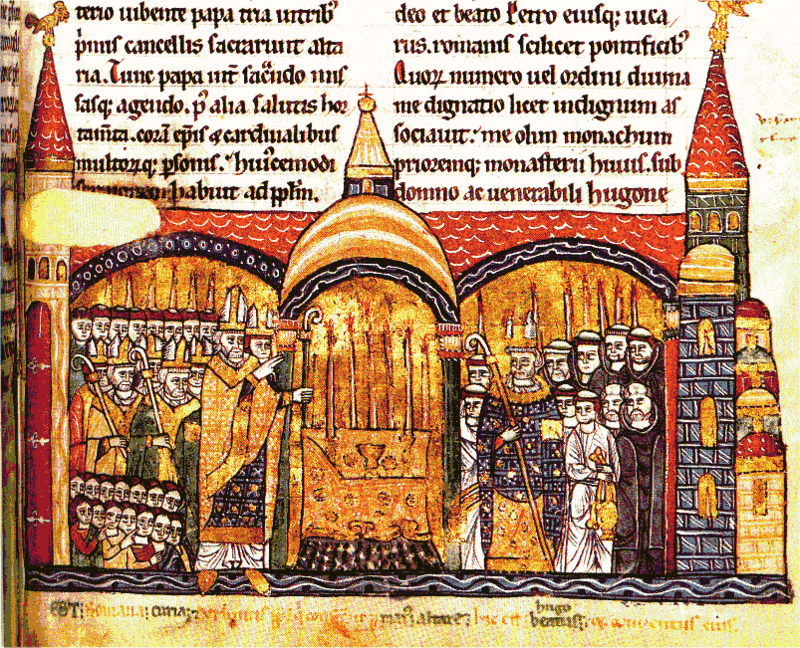
The consecration of the third Cluny Abbey by Pope Urban II

By the 10th century, Christianity had spread throughout much of Europe and Asia. The Church in England was becoming well established, with its scholarly monasteries, and the Roman Church and the Eastern Orthodox Church were continuing their separation, ultimately culminating in the Great Schism.

== Pre-scholastic theology ==
With the division and decline of the Carolingian Empire, notable theological activity was preserved in some of the cathedral schools that had begun to rise to prominence under it. Intellectual influences from the Arabic world (including works of classical authors preserved by Islamic scholars) percolated into the Christian West via Spain, influencing such theologians as Gerbert of Aurillac, who went on to become Pope Sylvester II and mentor to Otto III. (Otto was the fourth ruler of the Germanic Ottonian Holy Roman Empire, which succeeded the Carolingian Empire.)

== Monasticism ==
=== Monastic reform movement ===
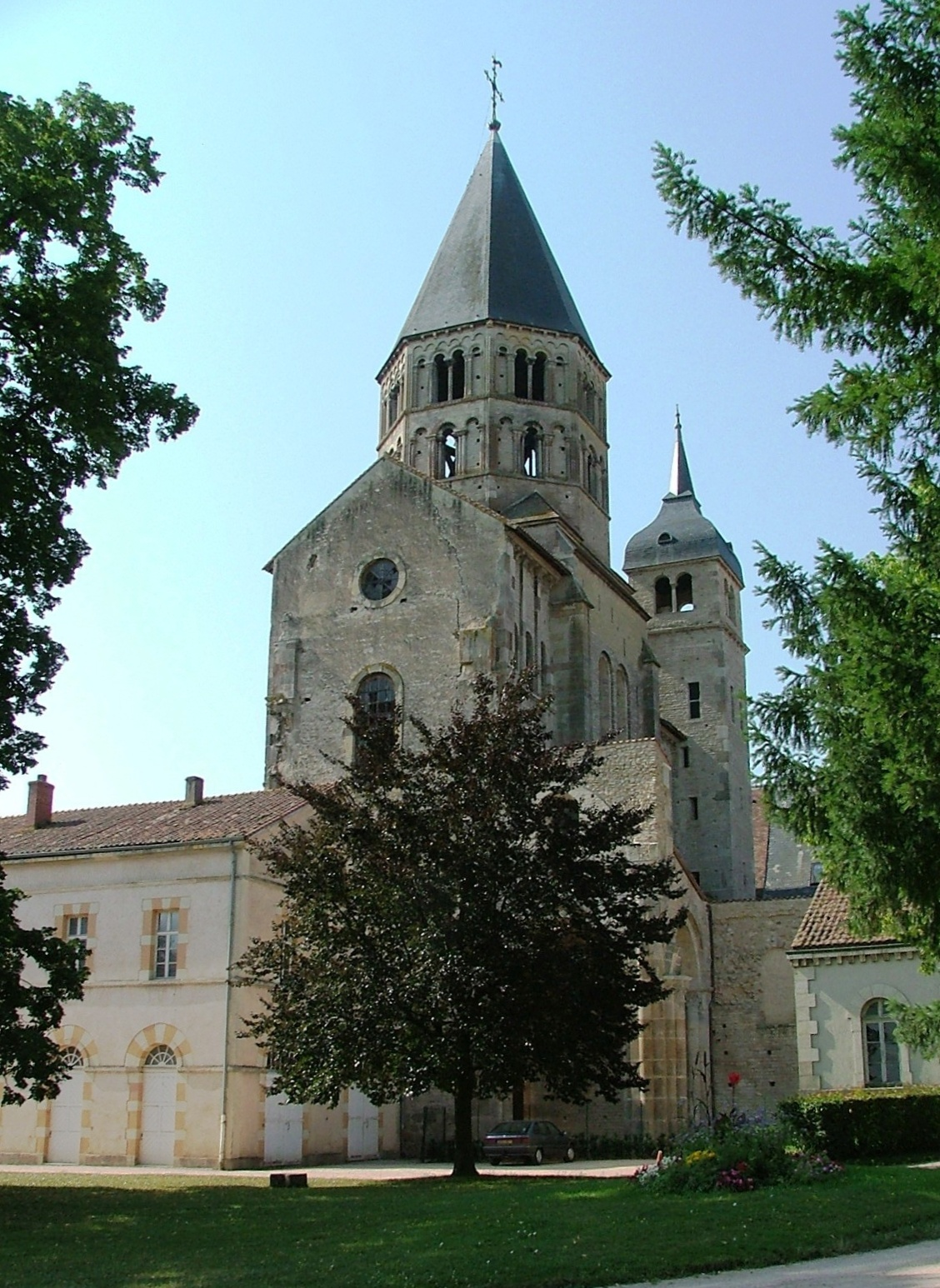
A view of the Abbey of Cluny

From the 6th century onward most of the monasteries in the West were of the Benedictine Order. Owing to the stricter adherence to a reformed Benedictine Rule, the abbey of Cluny in France became the acknowledged leader of western monasticism from the later 10th century. A sequence of highly competent abbots of Cluny were statesmen on an international level. The monastery of Cluny itself became the grandest, most prestigious and best endowed monastic institution in Europe. Cluny created a large federated order in which the administrators of subsidiary houses served as deputies of the abbot of Cluny and answered to him. Free of lay and episcopal interference, responsible only to the papacy, the Cluniac spirit was a revitalising influence on the Norman church. The height of Cluniac influence was from the second half of the 10th century through the early 12th.

The Cluniac reform of monasteries that began in 910 placed abbots under the direct control of the pope rather than the secular control of feudal lords, thus eliminating a major source of corruption. This sparked a great monastic renewal. Monasteries, convents and cathedrals still operated virtually all schools and libraries and often functioned as credit establishments promoting economic growth.

Monastic contributions to western society included the teaching of metallurgy, the introduction of new crops, the invention of musical notation and the creation and preservation of literature.

== First Patriarchate of Bulgarian Church ==
Following two decisive victories over the Byzantines at Acheloos (near the present-day city of Pomorie) and Katasyrtai (near Constantinople), Bulgaria declared the autonomous Bulgarian Archbishopric as autocephalous and elevated it to the rank of Patriarchate at an ecclesiastical and national council held in 919. After Bulgaria and the Byzantine Empire signed a peace treaty in 927 that concluded the 20-year-long war between them, the Patriarchate of Constantinople recognised the autocephalous status of the Bulgarian Orthodox Church and acknowledged its patriarchal dignity.

The Bulgarian Patriarchate was the first autocephalous Slavic Orthodox Church, preceding the autocephaly of the Serbian Orthodox Church (1219) by 300 years and of the Russian Orthodox Church (1596) by some 600 years. It was the sixth Patriarchate after the Pentarchy patriarchates of Rome, Constantinople, Alexandria, Antioch and Jerusalem. The seat of the Patriarchate was the new Bulgarian capital of Preslav.

On April 5, 972, Byzantine Emperor John I Tzimisces conquered and burned down Preslav, and captured Bulgarian Tsar Boris II. Patriarch Damyan managed to escape, initially to Sredetz (Sofia) in western Bulgaria. In the coming years, the residence of the Bulgarian patriarchs remained closely connected to the developments in the war between the next Bulgarian royal dynasty, the Comitopuli, and the Byzantine Empire. Patriarch German resided consecutively in the medieval Bulgarian cities of Maglen (Almopia) and Voden (Edessa) (both in present-day north-western Greece), and Prespa (in present-day southern North Macedonia). Around 990, the next patriarch, Philip, moved to Ohrid (in present-day south-western North Macedonia), which became the permanent seat of the Patriarchate.

== Spread of Christianity ==
=== Poland ===
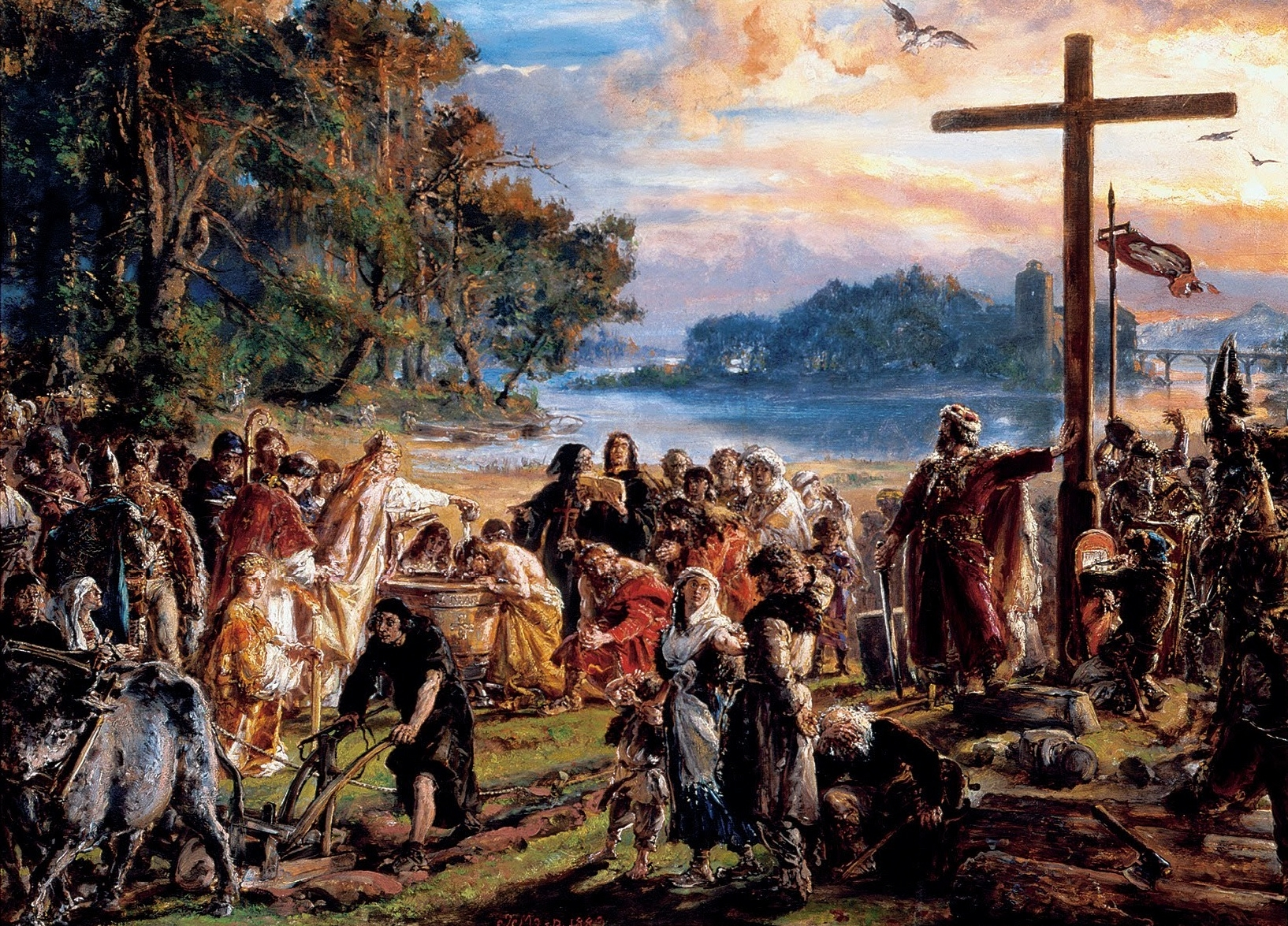
Christianization of Poland. A.D. 966., by Jan Matejko, 1888–89 (Royal Castle, Warsaw)

The "Baptism of Poland" (Polish: Chrzest Polski) in 966 refers to the baptism of Mieszko I, the first ruler of a united Polish state. His baptism was followed by the building of churches and the establishment of an ecclesiastical hierarchy. Mieszko saw baptism as a way of strengthening his hold on power, with the active support he could expect from the bishops, as well as a unifying force for the Polish people. Mieszko's action proved highly successful; by the 13th century, Roman Catholicism had become the dominant religion in Poland.

=== Hungary ===
In the Middle Ages, the Kingdom of Hungary (which was larger than modern day Hungary) was Christianized between 970 and 1038. Initially the Byzantine Christianity had a significant influence on the Hungarians, but the decisive steps towards the adoption of the new faith were taken by Géza, the head of the Hungarian tribal federation (c. 972–997) who supported Western missionaries. The reception of Christianity was enforced by legislation in the reign of Géza's son, Stephen I (997–1038).

Stephen promulgated Roman Catholicism as the state religion, and his successors were traditionally known as the Apostolic Kings. The Catholic Church in Hungary remained strong through the centuries, and the Archbishop of Esztergom was granted extraordinary temporal privileges as prince-primate (hercegprímás) of Hungary.

=== Kievan Rus' ===
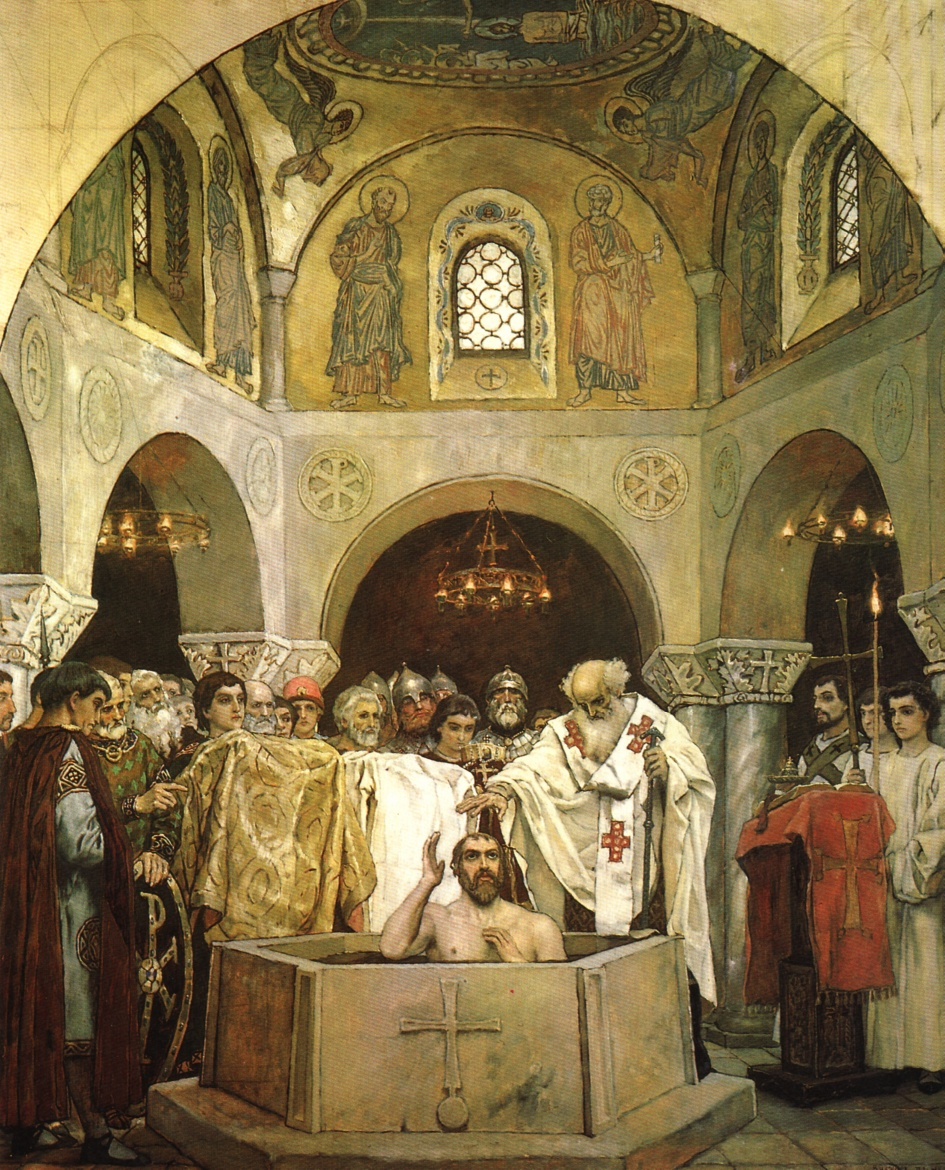
Baptism of Vladimir by Viktor Vasnetsov

The success of the conversion of the Bulgarians facilitated the conversion of other East Slavic peoples, most notably the Rus', predecessors of Belarusians, Russians, and Ukrainians.

After the First Bulgarian Empire was converted to Christianity, it started a massive missionary expansion north and east. As a result, it was able to convert and help convert many East Slavic peoples and introduce to them Bulgarian books and Church literature in Bulgarian, most notably the Rus' (Ruthenians), predecessors of Belarusians, Russians, and Ukrainians/Rusyns. By the beginning of the 11th century most of the pagan Slavic world, including Ukraine, Russia, Bulgaria and Serbia, had been converted to Christianity.

Between the 8th and the 13th century the area was settled by the Kievan Rus'. Its Christianization was successful in the 10th century, when about 980 Vladimir the Great was baptized at Chersonesos. He was also married to the Byzantine princess Anna Porphyrogeneta, the sister of the Byzantine Emperor Basil II. In 988, the Christian Church in Rus' territorially fell under the jurisdiction of the Ecumenical Patriarchate of Constantinople after it was officially adopted as the state religion. The Christianisation of Kievan Rus' firmly allied it with the Byzantine Empire. The Greek learning and book culture was adopted in Kiev and other centres of the country. Churches started to be built on the Byzantine model.

== Timeline ==
10th century Timeline
- 909 Abbey of Cluny, Benedictine monastery in France
- 912 - The Normans become Christian
- 948? Einsiedeln Abbey of Switzerland
- 948 - The leader of the Magyars converts to Christianity
- 957 - Princess Olga of Kiev baptized
- 965 - Harold I of Denmark converts to Christianity and smooths the way for the acceptance of Christian faith by the Danish people
- 966 Mieszko I duke of Poland baptised, Poland becomes a Christian country.
- 966 - Mieszko I of Poland converts to Christianity and begins the period of Christian Poland
- 984 Antipope Boniface VII, murdered Pope John XIV, alleged to have murdered Pope Benedict VI in 974
- 987 - Nestorian monks visiting China find no traces of Christian community left
- 988 Baptism of Kievan Rus'
- 988 - Baptism of Kievan Rus' under Vladimir I
- 995 - Christian missionaries from Norway begin working in Iceland
- 997 - Adalbert of Prague dies as a martyr in Prussia
- 997-998 Antipope John XVI, deposed by Pope Gregory V and his cousin Holy Roman Emperor Otto III
- 999 Much speculation and fear regarding the approach of the millennium
- 1000 - Olaf Tryggvason of Norway sends Leif Erikson to Greenland to preach Christianity

== See also ==
- History of Christianity
- History of the Catholic Church
- History of the Eastern Orthodox Church
- History of Christian theology
- History of Oriental Orthodoxy
- Christianization
- Timeline of Christianity
- Timeline of Christian missions
- Timeline of the Catholic Church
- Chronological list of saints in the 10th century

== Notes and references ==
History of Christianity: The Middle Ages
Preceded by: Christianity in the 9th century / 10th century / Followed by: Christianity in the 11th century
BC	C1	C2	C3	C4	C5	C6	C7	C8	C9	C10
C11	C12	C13	C14	C15	C16	C17	C18	C19	C20	C21
