= Cluniac Reforms =

10th-century changes within medieval monasticism

The Cluniac Reforms (also called the Benedictine Reform) were a series of changes within medieval monasticism in the Western Church focused on restoring the traditional monastic life, encouraging art, and caring for the poor. The movement began within the Benedictine order at Cluny Abbey, founded in 910 by William I, Duke of Aquitaine (875–918). The reforms were largely carried out by Saint Odo (c. 878 – 942) and spread throughout much of Western Europe.

== Background ==
In the early 10th century, Western monasticism, which had flourished several centuries earlier with St Benedict of Nursia, was experiencing a severe decline due to unstable political and social conditions resulting from the nearly continuous Viking raids, widespread poverty and, especially, the dependence of abbeys on the local nobles who controlled all that belonged to the territories under their jurisdiction.

The impetus for the reforms lay in abuses thought to be a result of secular interference in the monasteries and of the Church's tight integration with the feudal and manorial systems. Since a Benedictine monastery required land, it needed the patronage of a local lord. However, the lord would often demand rights and assert prerogatives that interfered with the operation of the monastery. Patrons normally retained a proprietary interest and expected to install their kinsmen as abbots. Local aristocrats often established churches, monasteries, and convents that they then considered as family property, taking revenues from them, and leaving the monks that remained subsisting in poverty.

Some monasteries were established by feudal lords with the intention of retiring there at some point. The Benedictine Rule, in these monasteries, was modified to schedule matins at a time when it would not interrupt sleep and to expand the vegetarian diet. Monks in these houses wore richer, warmer clothing and were free to disregard the rules pertaining to fasting.

The Cluny reform was an attempt to remedy these practices in the hope that a more independent abbot would better enforce the Rule of Saint Benedict.

As well as Cluny's home of Burgundy in it spread through much of the rest of France (including Provence, Auvergne, Poitou and Normandy) and into England, and through much of Italy, northern Portugal and Spain.

== Cluny Abbey ==
William I, Duke of Aquitaine (875–918) had acquired a piece of land in Burgundy. In 910 he founded Cluny Abbey and asked Abbot Berno of Baume Abbey to preside. The Abbot of Cluny retained authority over the daughter houses his order founded. By the twelfth century, the Congregation of Cluny included more than a thousand monasteries.

Berno had established St. Peter's monastery at Gigny and Baume Abbey on the rule as interpreted by Benedict of Aniane, who had sought to restore the primitive strictness of the monastic observance wherever it had been relaxed. The rule focused on prayer, silence, and solitude.

Among the most notable supporters of the Cluniac reforms were Pope Urban II, Lambert of Hersfeld, and Richard of Verdun. The reforms encouraged the Church in the West to be more attentive to business and led the papacy to attempt to assert control over the Eastern Church.

== Result ==
During its height (c. 950–c.1130), the Cluniac movement was one of the largest religious forces in Europe. At least as significantly as their political consequences, the reforms demanded greater religious devotion. The Cluniacs supported the Peace of God, and promoted pilgrimages to the Holy Lands. An increasingly rich liturgy stimulated demand for altar vessels of gold, fine tapestries and fabrics, stained glass, and polyphonic choral music to fill the Romanesque churches.

== The Cistercian Order ==
In 1075 Robert de Molesme, a Benedictine monk from Cluny Abbey, had obtained the permission of Pope Gregory VII to found a monastery at Molesme in Burgundy. At Molesme, Robert tried to restore monastery practice to the simple and severe character of the original Rule of Saint Benedict, called "Strict Observance". Being only partly successful in this at Molesme, Robert in 1098 led a band of 21 monks from their abbey at Molesme to establish a new monastery. The monks acquired a plot of marsh land just south of Dijon called Cîteaux (Latin: "Cistercium") and set about building a new monastery there which became Cîteaux Abbey, the mother Abbey of the newly founded Cistercian Order.

== See also ==
- Concordat of Worms
- First Council of the Lateran
- Gregorian Reform
- The Investiture Controversy
