= Christianity in the 9th century =

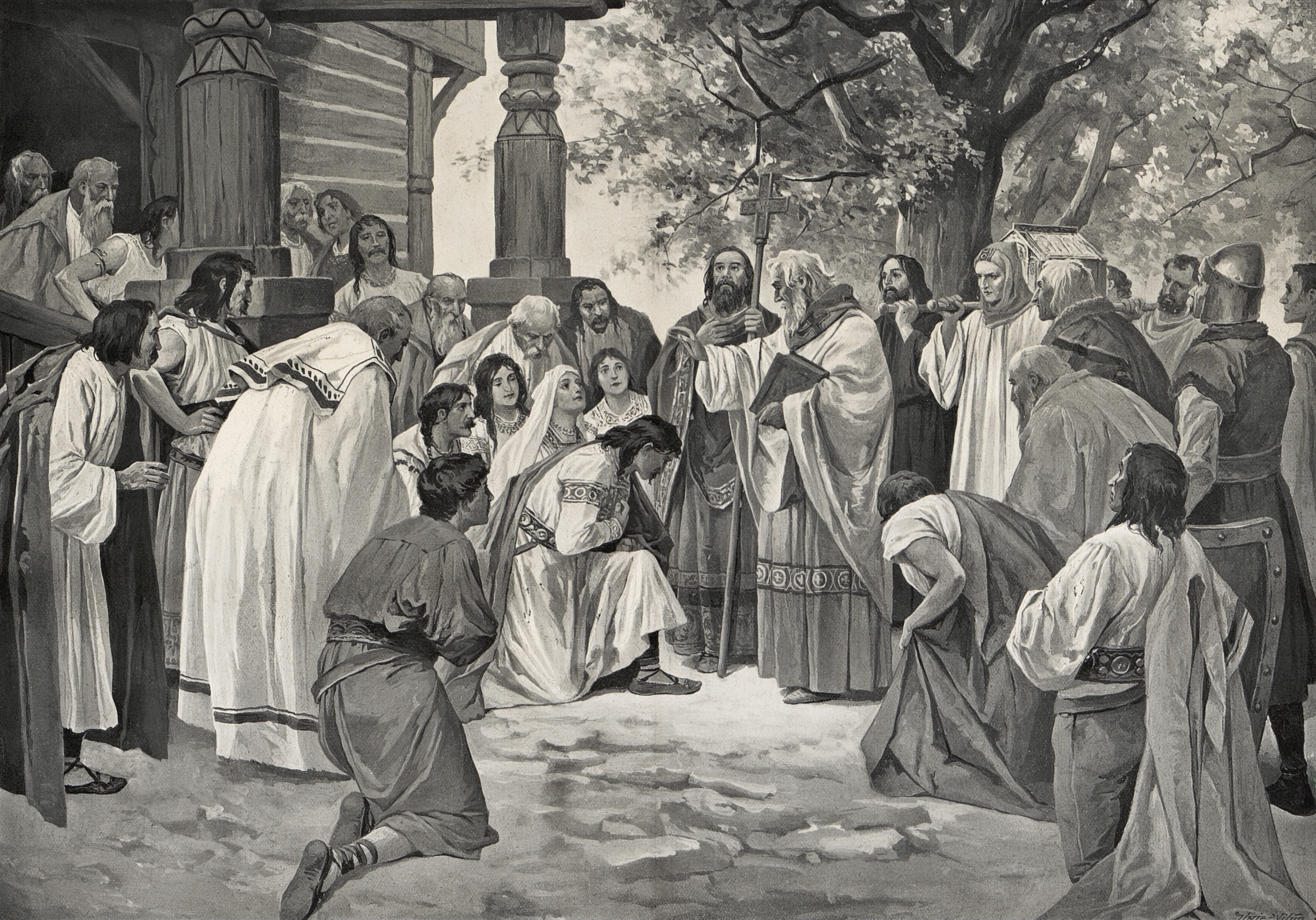
Brothers Cyril and Methodius bring Christianity to the Slavic peoples.

In the 9th century, Christianity was spreading throughout Europe, being promoted especially in the Carolingian Empire, its eastern neighbours, Scandinavia, and northern Spain. In 800, Charlemagne was crowned as Holy Roman Emperor, which continued the Photian schism.

== Carolingian Renaissance ==
On Christmas day in 800, the Roman Patriarch Leo III crowned Charles, the eldest son of Pepin the Short, as the "Holy Roman Emperor". In essence this denied the status of the Byzantine Empress Irene, reigning in Constantinople. This act caused a substantial diplomatic rift between the Franks and Constantinople, as well as between Rome and the other patriarchs in the East. Though the rifts were settled to some degree and the Church in Rome in theory remained united with Constantinople and the rest of the imperial church, paths culminating in the Great Schism.

With Charlemagne's coronation, the papacy had acquired a new protectorate in the West. This freed the pontiffs to some degree from the power of the emperor in Constantinople but also led to a schism, because the emperors and patriarchs of Constantinople interpreted themselves as the true descendants of the Roman Empire dating back to the beginnings of the Church. Pope Nicholas I had refused to recognize Patriarch Photios I of Constantinople, who in turn had attacked the pope as a heretic because he kept the filioque in the creed, which referred to the Holy Spirit emanating from God the Father and the Son. The papacy was strengthened through this new alliance, which in the long term created a new problem for the Popes, when in the Investiture Controversy succeeding emperors sought to appoint bishops and even future popes.

Charles followed with a policy of forcible conversion of all Frankish subjects to the Roman Church, specifically declaring loyalty to Rome (as opposed to Constantinople). The strength of the Frankish armies helped repel further incursion of Muslim forces in Europe. Charles was seen in the West as having revived the Roman Empire and came to be known as Charles the Great (Charlemagne in French). The re-unification of Europe led to increased prosperity and a slow re-emergence of culture and learning in Western Europe. Charlemagne's empire came to be called the Holy Roman Empire by its inhabitants. The Church in Rome became a central defining symbol of this empire.

The Carolingian Renaissance was a period of intellectual and cultural revival during the late 8th and 9th centuries, mostly during the reigns of Charlemagne and Louis the Pious. There was an increase of literature, the arts, architecture, jurisprudence, liturgical and scriptural studies. The period also saw the development of Carolingian minuscule, the ancestor of modern lower-case script, and the standardisation of Latin which had hitherto become varied and irregular. To address the problems of illiteracy among clergy and court scribes, Charlemagne founded schools. These attracted the most learned men from all of Europe to his court, such as Theodulf, Paul the Deacon, Angilbert, Paulinus of Aquileia, and Alcuin of York.

By the 9th century, largely under the inspiration of the Emperor Charlemagne, Benedict's Rule became the basic guide for Western monasticism.

== Theology ==
=== Western theology ===
With the division and decline of the Carolingian Empire, notable theological activity was preserved in some of the Cathedral schools that had begun to rise to prominence under it - for instance at Auxerre in the 9th century or Chartres in the 11th. Intellectual influences from the Arabic world (including works of classical authors preserved by Islamic scholars) percolated into the Christian West via Spain, influencing such theologians as Gerbert of Aurillac, who went on to become Pope Sylvester II and mentor to Otto III. (Otto was the fourth ruler of the Germanic Ottonian Holy Roman Empire, successor to the Carolingian Empire).

== Tensions between East and West ==
In the 9th century, Eastern Roman emperor Michael III struggled to appoint Photius as Patriarch of Constantinople, and Pope Nicholas I struggled to keep Ignatius there. After Michael was murdered, Ignatius was reinstated as patriarch without challenge. An ecumenical council in Constantinople, held while Ignatius was patriarch, anathematized Photius. With Ignatius' death in 877, Photius became patriarch, and in 879-880 a second ecumenical council in Constantinople annulled the decision of the previous council. The West takes only the first as truly ecumenical and legitimate. The East takes only the second.

=== Filioque clause ===
Since the 5th century, Christendom had been divided into a pentarchy of five sees with Rome holding the primacy. This was determined by canonical decision and did not entail hegemony of any one local church or patriarchate over the others. However, Rome began to interpret her primacy in terms of sovereignty, as a God-given right involving universal jurisdiction in the Church. The collegial and conciliar nature of the Church, in effect, was gradually abandoned in favor of a supremacy of unlimited papal power over the entire Church. These ideas were finally given systematic expression in the West during the Gregorian Reform movement of the 11th century.

This fundamental difference in ecclesiology would cause all attempts to heal the schism and bridge the divisions to fail. Rome bases her claims to "true and proper jurisdiction" (as the Vatican Council of 1870 put it) on St. Peter. This "Roman" exegesis of Matthew 16:18, however, has been unacceptable to the patriarchs of Eastern Orthodoxy. For them, specifically, St. Peter's primacy could never be the exclusive prerogative of any one bishop. All bishops must, like St. Peter, confess Jesus as the Christ and, as such, all are St. Peter's successors. The churches of the East gave the Roman See primacy but not supremacy, the pope being the first among equals but not infallible and not with absolute authority.

The other major irritant to Eastern Orthodoxy was the Western interpretation of the procession of the Holy Spirit. Like the primacy, this too developed gradually. This theologically complex issue involved the addition by the West of the Latin phrase filioque ("and from the Son") to the Creed. The original Creed sanctioned by the councils and still used today by the Orthodox Church did not contain this phrase; the text simply states "the Holy Spirit, the Lord and Giver of Life, who proceeds from the Father." Theologically, the Latin interpolation was unacceptable to Eastern Orthodoxy since it implied that the Spirit now had two sources of origin and procession, the Father and the Son, rather than the Father alone. The balance between the three persons of the Trinity was altered and the understanding of the Trinity and God confused. The result, the Orthodox Church believed, was theologically indefensible.

But in addition to the dogmatic issue raised by the filioque, the Greeks argued that the phrase had been added unilaterally and, therefore, illegitimately, since the East had not been consulted. In the final analysis, only another ecumenical council could introduce such an alteration. Indeed, the councils, which drew up the original Creed had expressly forbidden any subtraction or addition to the text.

=== Photian schism ===
The controversy also involved Eastern and Western ecclesiastical jurisdictional rights in the Bulgarian church. Photius did provide concession on the issue of jurisdictional rights concerning Bulgaria, and the papal legates made do with his return of Bulgaria to Rome. This concession, however, was purely nominal, as Bulgaria's return to the Byzantine rite in 870 had already secured for it an autocephalous church. Without the consent of Boris I of Bulgaria, the papacy was unable to enforce its claims.

=== Justinian I ===
The city of Rome was embroiled in the turmoil and devastation of Italian peninsular warfare during the Early Middle Ages. Emperor Justinian I attempted to reassert imperial dominion in Italy against the Gothic aristocracy. The subsequent campaigns were more or less successful, and the Imperial Exarchate was established in Ravenna to oversee Italy, though actually imperial influence was often limited. However, the weakened peninsula then experienced the invasion of the Lombards, and the resulting warfare essentially left Rome to fend for itself. Thus the popes, out of necessity, found themselves feeding the city with grain from papal estates, negotiating treaties, paying protection money to Lombard warlords, and, failing that, hiring soldiers to defend the city. Eventually, the failure of the empire to send aid resulted in the popes turning for support from other sources, especially the Franks.

== Spread of Christianity ==
=== Scandinavia ===
Early evangelisation in Scandinavia was begun by Ansgar, Archbishop of Bremen, "Apostle of the North". Ansgar, a native of Amiens, was sent with a group of monks to Jutland Denmark around 820, at the time of the pro-Christian Jutland King Harald Klak. The mission was only partially successful, and Ansgar returned two years later to Germany, after Harald had been driven out of his kingdom. In 829 Ansgar went to Birka on Lake Mälaren, Sweden, with his aide friar Witmar, and a small congregation was formed in 831. This congregation included the king's steward Hergeir. Conversion was slow, but continued for more than a hundred years. Most Scandinavian lands were only completely Christianised at the time of rulers such as Saint Canute IV of Denmark and Olaf I of Norway in the years following 1000.

The Roman emperor encouraged missionary expeditions to nearby nations including the Muslim caliphate, the Turkic Khazars, and Slavic Moravia.

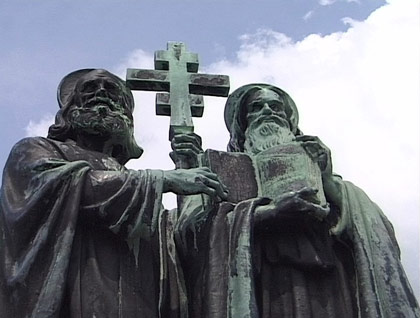
St. Cyril and St. Methodius Monument on Mt. Radhošť

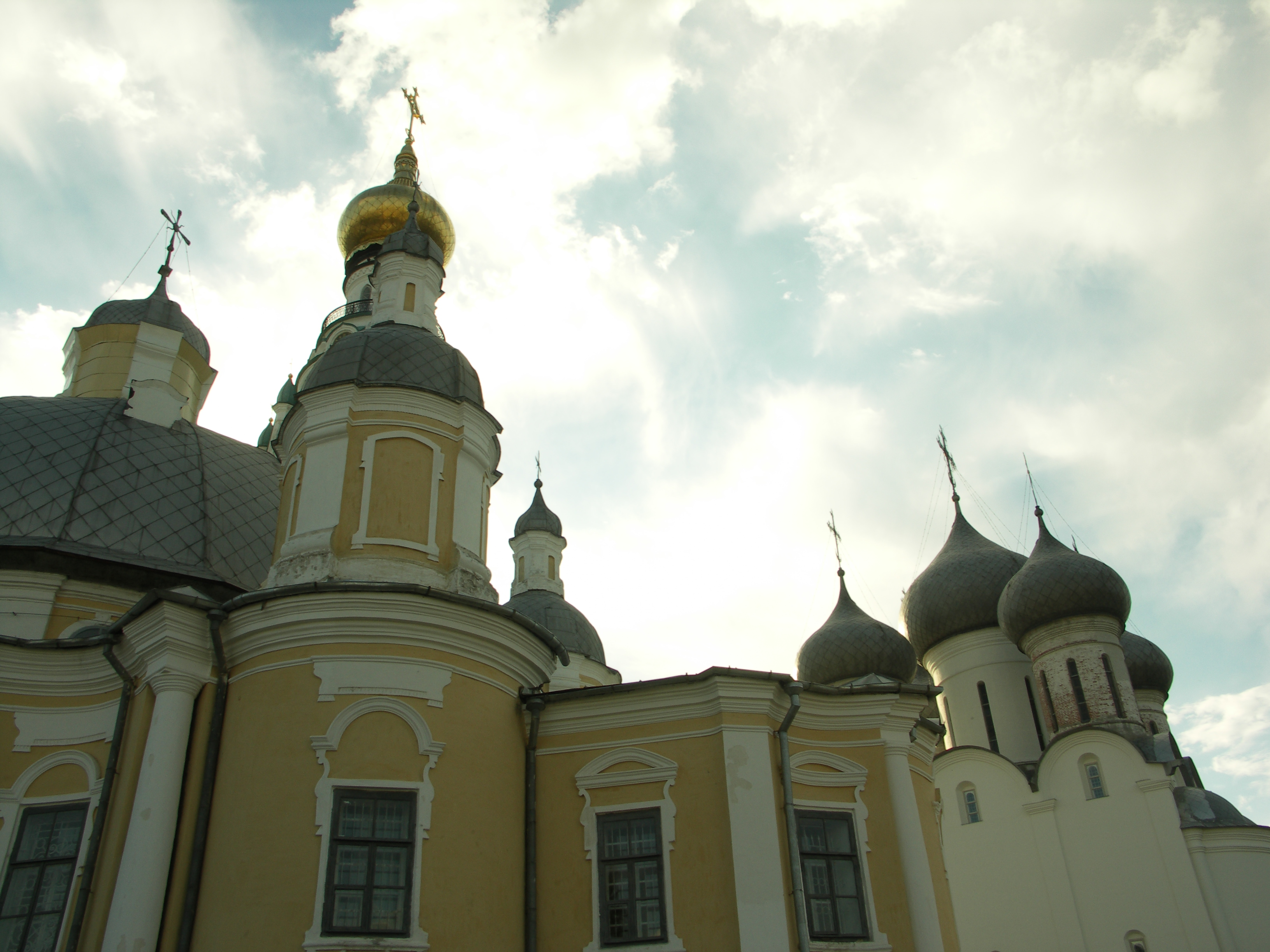
Orthodox churches in Vologda, Russia

Though by 800 Western Europe was ruled entirely by Christian kings, Eastern Europe remained an area of missionary activity. The First Bulgarian Empire was the first of the Eastern European nations to adopt Christianity as a state religion in 868. It declared independence of Constantinople and Rome soon after. The Bulgarian alphabet was introduced in the late 9th century, and numerous Bulgarian missionaries introduced the Bulgarian script to Serbs, Russians, Vlachs and the rest of Eastern European peoples. The Christianization of Kievan Rus' in 988 also led to the spread of Christianity in Eastern Europe.

=== Moravia ===
The evangelisation, or Christianisation, of the Slavs was initiated by one of Byzantium's most learned churchmen - the Patriarch Photius. The Byzantine emperor Michael III chose Cyril and Methodius in response to a request from King Rastislav of Moravia, who wanted missionaries that could minister to the Moravians in their own language. The two brothers spoke the local Slavonic vernacular and translated the Bible and many of the prayer books. As the translations prepared by them were copied by speakers of other dialects, the hybrid literary language Old Church Slavonic was created. Photius has been called the "Godfather of all Slavs." For a period of time, there was a real possibility that all of the newly baptized South Slav nations: Bulgarians, Serbs, and Croats would join the Western church. In the end, only the Croats joined the Roman Catholic Church.

In Great Moravia, Constantine and Methodius encountered Frankish missionaries from Germany, representing the western or Latin branch of the Church, and committed to linguistic, and cultural uniformity. They insisted on the use of the Latin liturgy, and they regarded Moravia and the resident Slavic peoples as part of their rightful mission field. When friction developed, the brothers, unwilling to be a cause of dissension among Christians, travelled to Rome to see the Pope, seeking his approval of their missionary work and the use of Bulgarian liturgy which would allow them to continue their work and avoid quarrelling between missionaries in the field. Constantine entered a monastery in Rome, taking the name Cyril, by which he is now remembered. However, he died only a few weeks thereafter.

Pope Adrian II gave Methodius the title of Archbishop of Sirmium (now Sremska Mitrovica in Serbia) and sent him back in 869, with jurisdiction over all of Moravia and Pannonia and authorisation to use the Slavonic Liturgy. Soon, however, Prince Ratislav died, and his successor did not support Methodius. In 870 the Frankish king Louis and his bishops deposed Methodius at a synod at Ratisbon and imprisoned him for a little over two years. Pope John VIII secured his release but instructed him to stop using the Slavonic Liturgy. In 878, Methodius was summoned to Rome on charges of heresy and using Slavonic liturgy. This time Pope John was convinced by the arguments that Methodius made in his defence and sent him back cleared of all charges, and with permission to use Slavonic Liturgy. The Carolingian bishop who succeeded him, Wiching, suppressed the Slavonic Liturgy and forced the followers of Methodius into exile.

=== Bulgaria ===
After its establishment under Kubrat, the new First Bulgarian Empire found itself between the kingdom of the East Franks and the Byzantine Empire. Christianization then took place in the 9th century under Boris I. The Bulgarians became Eastern Orthodox Christians and the Bulgarian Orthodox Church was created.

In 863, a mission from the Patriarch of Constantinople converted Tsar Boris I of Bulgaria to Christianity. Boris realized that the Christianization of his subjects by the Byzantine mission would facilitate the undesired spread of Byzantine influence in Bulgaria, as the liturgy was carried out in the Greek language, and the newly established Bulgarian Church was subordinate to the Church of Constantinople. A popular revolt against the new religion prompted the king to request that the Bulgarian Church be granted independence by Constantinople.

After Constantinople refused to grant the Bulgarian Church independence, Boris turned to the Pope. In August 866, a Bulgarian mission arrived in Rome, carrying a list of 115 questions to the Pope by Boris, regarding the Christian way of life and a future Bulgarian Church under Rome's jurisdiction. In Constantinople, people nervously watched the events taking place in their northern neighbour, because a pro-Rome Bulgaria threatened Constantinople's immediate interests. A religious council was held in the summer of 867 in the Byzantine capital, during which the Roman Church's behaviour was harshly condemned. As a personal culprit, Pope Nicholas I was anathematized. On 13 November 866, Boris was presented with the Pope's 106 answers by Bishops Formosa from Portua and Paul of Populon, who led the pope's mission to Bulgaria. The arrival of the Roman clerical mission concluded the activity of the Byzantine mission, which was ordered by the king to leave Bulgaria. In a letter to Boris, the Byzantine emperor Michael III expressed his disapproval of Bulgaria's religious reorientation and used offensive language against the Roman Church.

The Roman mission's efforts were met with success, and King Boris asked the pope to appoint Formosa of Portua as Bulgarian Archbishop. The Pope refused. Pope Nicolas I died soon after. His successor Pope Adrian II was more disinclined to comply with Boris' demand that a Bulgarian archbishop be appointed by him.

Consequently, Boris again began negotiations with Constantinople. These negotiations resulted in the creation of an autonomous national (Bulgarian) Archbishopric, which was unprecedented in the practice of the Churches. Usually, churches that were founded by apostles or apostles' students became independent. Rome had been challenging Constantinople's equality to Rome, on the grounds that the Church of Constantinople had not been founded by a student of Christ. Nevertheless, Boris had been granted a national independent church and a high-ranking supreme representative. In the next 10 years, Pope Adrian II and his successors made desperate attempts to reclaim their influence in Bulgaria and to persuade Boris to leave Constantinople's sphere of influence, but their efforts ultimately failed.

The foundations of the Bulgarian national Church had been set. The next stage was the implementation of the Glagolitic alphabet and the Bulgarian language as official language of the Bulgarian Church and State in 893 - something considered unthinkable by most European Christians. In 886, Cyril and Methodius' disciples were expelled from Moravia, and the use of Slavic liturgy was banned by the Pope in favour of Latin. St. Kliment and St. Naum who were of noble Bulgarian descent and St. Angelaruis, returned to Bulgaria, where they were welcomed by Tsar Boris, who viewed the Bulgarian liturgy as a means of counteracting Byzantine influence in the country. In a short time, they managed create the Bulgarian Alphabet and to instruct several thousand future Bulgarian clergymen in the rites using the newly created Bulgarian language. In 893, Bulgaria expelled its Byzantine clergy and proclaimed Bulgarian as the official language of the Bulgarian Church and State. In this way it became one of the first European countries with its own official language.

=== Kievan Rus' ===
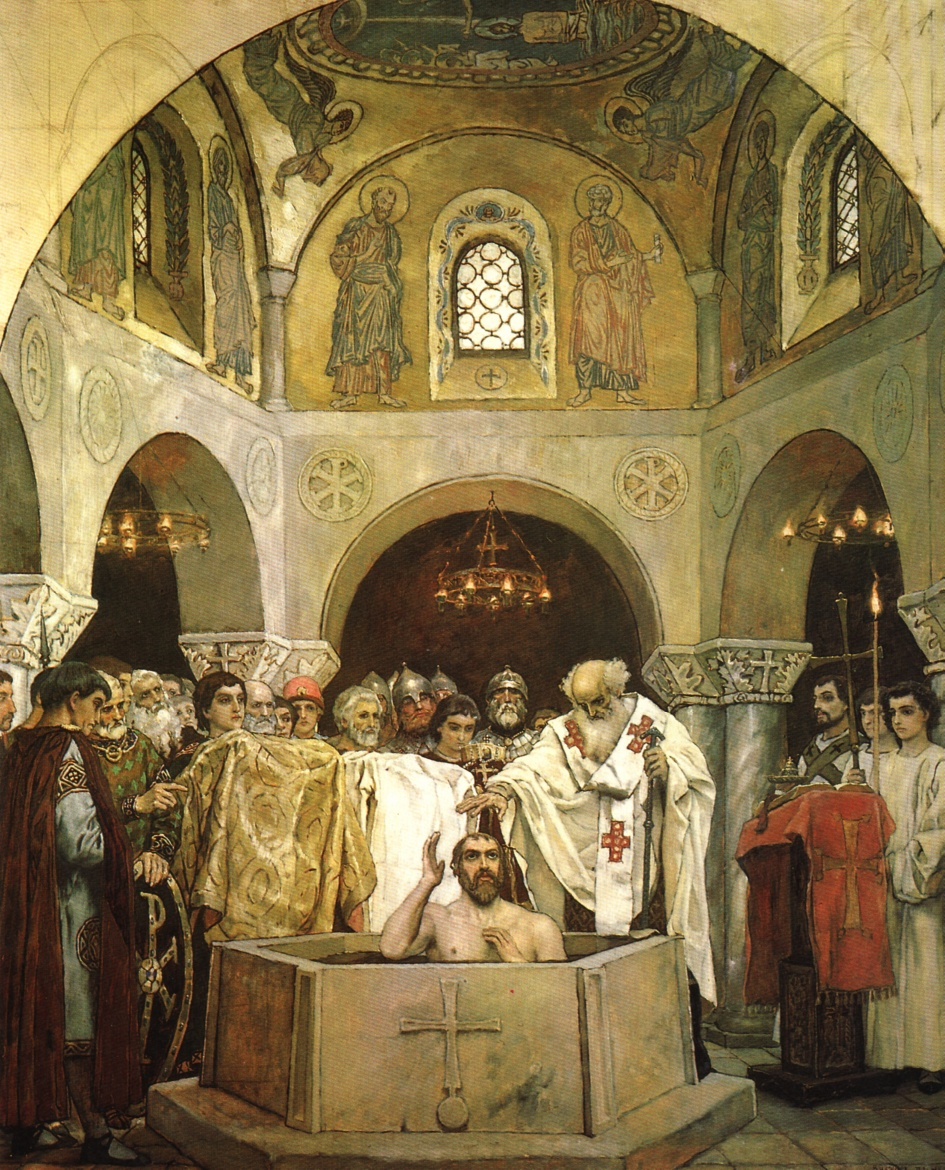
Baptism of Vladimir

After the First Bulgarian Empire converted to Christianity, it started a massive missionary expansion north and east. As a result, it was able to convert and help convert many East Slavic peoples and introduce to them Bulgarian books and church literature in Bulgarian, most notably the Rus' elite. The efforts at Christianization were finally successful in the 10th century, when Vladimir the Great was baptized at Chersonesos in 988. By the beginning of the 11th century, most of the pagan Slavic world, including Russia, Bulgaria and Serbia, had been converted to Christianity.

=== China ===
An early medieval mission of the Assyrian Church of the East brought Christianity to China, but it was suppressed in the 9th century. The Christianity of that period is commemorated by the Nestorian Stele and Daqin Pagoda of Xi'an.

== Timeline ==
- 822 - Mojmir I of Moravia converts to Christianity
- 826 - Ansgar from France is sent by papal authority to Denmark as a royal chaplain and missionary; Harald Klak is baptized along with 400 of his followers at Mainz
- 830 - First Christian church in present-day Slovakia is built in Nitra; First missionaries reach the area that is now the Czech Republic
- 830 - Scottish-born Erluph is evangelizing in (what is now) Germany when he is killed by the Vandals
- 849-865 Ansgar, Archbishop of Bremen, "Apostle of the North", began evangelisation of North Germany, Denmark, Sweden
- 855 Antipope Anastasius, Louis II, Holy Roman Emperor appointed him over Pope Benedict III but popular pressure caused withdrawal
- 859 - Execution of Eulogius, proponent of confrontational Christian witness in Spain and other Muslim-dominated societies. Opposed to any feeling of affinity with Muslim culture, Eulogius advocated using a missiology of martyrdom to confront Islam.
- 863 Saint Cyril and Saint Methodius sent by the Patriarch of Constantinople to evangelise the Slavic peoples. They translate the Bible into Slavonic.
- 863 - Cyril and Methodius are invited by Rastislav to evangelize in Great Moravia and the Balaton Principality
- 864 - Conversion of Prince Boris of Bulgaria
- 867 - All Serbian tribes are fully Christianized
- 869-870 Catholic Fourth Council of Constantinople, condemned Patriarch Photius, rejected by Orthodox
- 878 - Last definite reference to Christians in China before the Mongol era
- 880 - First Slavic archbishopric established in Great Moravia with Methodius as its head; Bible translated into Slavonic
- 879-880 Orthodox Fourth Council of Constantinople, restored Photius, condemned Pope Nicholas I and Stephen VI conducts trial against dead Pope Formosus, public uprising against Stephen led to his imprisonment and strangulation
- 900 - Missionaries from the archdiocese of Bremen-Hamburg reach Norway

== See also ==
- History of Christianity
- History of the Roman Catholic Church
- History of the Eastern Orthodox Church
- History of Christian theology
- History of Oriental Orthodoxy
- Christianization
- Timeline of Christianity
- Timeline of Christian missions
- Timeline of the Roman Catholic Church
- Chronological list of saints in the 9th century

History of Christianity: The Middle Ages
Preceded by: Christianity in the 8th century / 9th century / Followed by: Christianity in the 10th century
| BC | C1 | C2 | C3 | C4 | C5 | C6 | C7 | C8 | C9 | C10 |
| C11 | C12 | C13 | C14 | C15 | C16 | C17 | C18 | C19 | C20 | C21 |
