= Chytri =

Ancient city-kingdom of Cyprus

- Χύτροι (Greek)
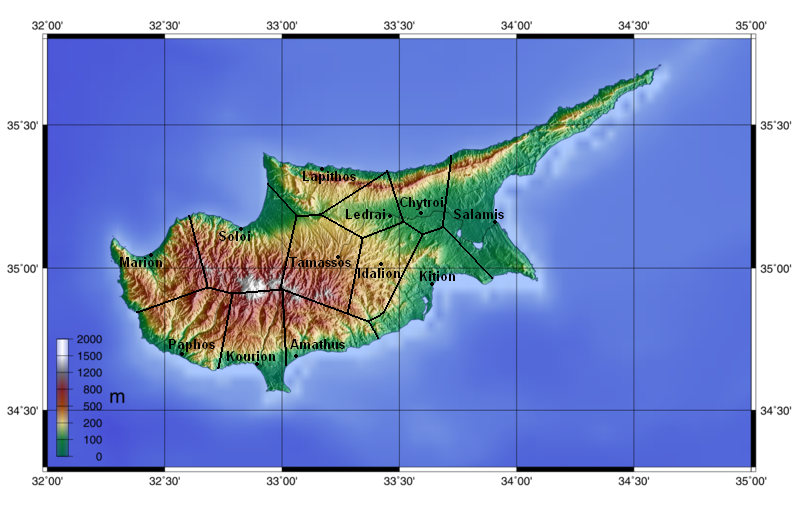
- Map showing the ancient city Kingdoms of Cyprus

- Location within Cyprus
- 35.251979°N 33.494769°E
- Location: Cyprus
- Region: Nicosia District

Chytri (Ancient Greek: Χύτροι, romanized: Khútroi) was one of the ten city-kingdoms of Cyprus in antiquity. It was located in the centre of the island, in the territory of Chytraea, west of Mesaoria. Today the modern town of Kythrea has preserved the ancient name.

== Ancient history ==
According to mythology, after the fall of Troy, Greek immigrants led by Chytros, son of Alexander and grandson of the Athenian Acamas, hero of the Attic tribe of the same name, settled on Cyprus. The modern village of Kythrea is situated near the ancient kingdom of Chytri which was founded by Chytros. A necropolis has been discovered. In the time of the Assyrian king Ashurbanipal, Pilagura was king of Chytri, one of the ten kingdoms on the island. Numerous inscriptions have been found in the Cypriot dialect, some in ordinary Greek. Chytri was noted for the worship of Apollo, Artemis and Aphrodite Paphia. In the Delphic Theorodochoi inscription, one inscription mentions Chytri. Later forms of the name are Cythraia, Cythereia, Cythroi, and Chytrides; according to the work of Athanasios Sakellarios (Κυπριακά, 1890, 202–205) Kythrea should be Cythera or Cythereia; he identifies Chytri with Palo-Kythro, a village with ruins two hours south of Kyrka. However, historical texts mention only one town.

Diogenes Laërtius writes that there was a festival held at Chytri with theatrical plays.

== Middle Ages ==
Chytri was an episcopal see at an early date. Michel Le Quien's list of the bishops of the see (II, 1069) is incomplete, with only eight being recorded: the first is Saint Pappus, who was martyred under Licinius, Maximinus Daza or Constantius Chlorus; the most famous is Saint Demetrian, 885 – c. 912.

The Greek Orthodox, see of similar title was suppressed in 1222 by Pelagio Galvani, the papal legate, while the island was a Latin crusader kingdom.

== See also ==
- List of ancient Greek cities
