= Odo of Cluny =

Benedictine monk, second abbot of Cluny

Saint Odo of Cluny
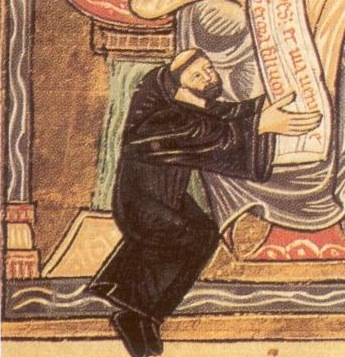
- Odo of Cluny, 11th century miniature

Abbot
- Born: c. 878; Le Mans, West Francia
- Died: 18 November 942; Tours, West Francia
- Venerated in: Catholic Church; Eastern Orthodox Church
- Feast: 18 November; 11 May
- Patronage: Musicians, for rain, against drought

Odo of Cluny (French: Odon; c. 878 – 18 November 942) was the second abbot of Cluny.

Born to a noble family, he served as a page at the court of Aquitaine. He became a canon of the Church of St. Martin in Tours and continued his education in Paris under Remigius of Auxerre. Upon returning to Tours, Odo became disillusioned with the life of a canon and subsequently entered the Benedictine abbey at Baume, where he became superior of the abbey school.

Odo joined Abbot Berno at Cluny and, when Berno died in 927, was elected his successor. While abbot, he also managed the priory at Romainmôtier. Next, he undertook the reform of Fleury Abbey. He encouraged the monks to adhere more closely to the original Rule of Saint Benedict. In 931, the Pope authorized Odo to continue his work in the monasteries of Aquitaine. He enacted the various Cluniac Reforms of France and Italy. In 937, he went to Rome and was given the Basilica of Saint Paul Outside the Walls. He also sent his aides to Monte Cassino and Subiaco.

Odo initiated the practice among the monasteries following Cluny to hold an annual commemoration of all the faithful departed on the day after All Saints' Day.

He is venerated as a saint by the Catholic and Eastern Orthodox Churches. His feast day is 18 November.

There is only one contemporary biography of him, the Vita Odonis written by John of Salerno.

== Early life ==
Odo was born in about 878, the son of Abbo, feudal lord of Deols, near Le Mans, and his wife, Arenberga. According to the Vita later written by Odo's disciple John, the couple had long been childless, and on Christmas Eve, Abbo prayed to Our Lady to obtain for him the gift of a son. When the child was born, his grateful father entrusted the boy to the Church of St. Martin in Tours. Both his parents later joined monasteries. His brother Bernard also became a monk.

While yet a child, Odo was sent first to the court of Fulk the Good, Count of Anjou; later, he became a page at the court of William the Pious, duke of Aquitaine, where he spent several years. Odo developed a particular devotion to Mary, under the title "Mother of Mercy", an invocation by which he would address her throughout his life.

== Church of St Martin, Tours ==
In the 9th and 10th centuries, the tomb of St Martin of Tours was considered one of the holiest sites in Western Christendom. At age 19, Odo was tonsured as a canon of the Church of St. Martin in Tours, where he spent six years studying classic authors, the Fathers of the Church, poetry, and music. Odo would later say that the monks of the monastery of St. Martin of Tours had been spoiled by all the wealth and gifts brought by the pilgrims and had abandoned the Rule they were required to follow. He would later tell his monks that the religious at Tours no longer attended nightly Lauds for fear of getting their fine shoes dirty. Odo's experience at Tours later led him to embrace the monastic reform movement.

In 901, he traveled to Paris, where he spent four years completing a course of theological studies, including the study of philosophy under Remigius of Auxerre. Upon his return to Tours, Odo adopted a disciplined and ascetic lifestyle. One day, in reading the rule of Saint Benedict, he was confounded to see how much his life fell short of the maxims there laid down, and he determined to embrace a monastic state. The count of Anjou, his patron, refused to consent, and Odo spent almost three years in a cell, with one companion, in the practice of penance and contemplation. At length, he resolved that no impediments should any longer hinder him from consecrating himself to God in the monastic state. He resigned his canonry and secretly repaired to the monastery of Beaume, in the diocese of Besançon, where the Abbot Berno admitted him to the habit. He brought only his books, about a hundred volumes.

== The Monastery at Baume ==
Around 909, Odo entered Baume, which was under the direction of Abbot Berno. Berno had joined the Benedictine Order at the Abbey of St. Martin in Autun, where Hugh of Anzy le Duc had introduced stricter adherence to the Rule of Saint Benedict. Later, Berno was sent to the diocese of Besançon to restore the monastery at Baume-les-Messieurs, which had fallen into neglect.

Bishop Turpio of Limoges ordained Odo to the priesthood, which Odo was obliged to accept under obedience. However, Odo was so depressed by this that Berno sent him back to the bishop to visit. Odo and the bishop talked about the church's evil condition and the abuses occurring. Odo spoke about the book of Jeremiah, and the bishop was so impressed by his words that he asked Odo to write it down. Odo said he could not do so without first getting permission from Berno, and the bishop then got Berno's permission, and Odo then wrote down his second book, the Collationes.

Odo became the superior of the abbey school at Baume.

== Cluny ==
In 910, Abbot Berno left Baume to found Cluny Abbey, taking some of the monks with him. It is not clear exactly when Odo left Baume for Cluny. Berno had control of six monasteries when he died in 927, three of which he gave to Wido, and the other three he gave to Odo. The monks of Cluny elected Odo as abbot, but he refused on grounds of unworthiness. The bishop threatened Odo with excommunication if he continued to refuse, and thus Odo accepted the office.

At Berno's death in 927 (Odo would have been almost 50), Odo became abbot of three monasteries: Deols, Massay, and Cluny. Baume became the possession of Wido, who had been the leader of the monks who persecuted Odo when he was with them at Baume. Immediately following Berno's death, Wido attempted to gain control of Cluny by force, but Pope John X sent a letter to Rudolf, King of the Franks, to intervene. Cluny was still not finished construction when Odo became abbot, and he continued construction efforts, but he ran into financial difficulties. Odo had a strong devotion to St Martin of Tours for most of his life. He continued to pray to St Martin for all of his and the monastery's problems. One story recounts that one year, on the feast day of Martin of Tours, Odo saw an older man looking over the unfinished building. The older man then went to Odo and said he was St Martin, and that if the monks continued to persevere, he would arrange for the money they needed to come to them. A few days later, 3000 solidi of gold were brought as a gift to Cluny.

Odo continued to uphold the Benedictine Rule at Cluny just as Berno had done. Throughout Odo's rule of Cluny, the monastery enjoyed protection from both Popes and temporal rulers, who guaranteed its independence. Many times during Odo's reign, Cluny's property expanded as land was added as gifts. During his tenure as abbot, the monastic church of St. Peter and Paul was completed.

Odo taught the monks that the blind and the lame were the porters of the gates of paradise. If a monk were ever rude or harsh to a beggar who came to the monastery gates, Odo would call the beggar back and tell him, "When he who has served thee thus, comes himself seeking entrance from thee at the gates of paradise, repay him in like manner." The charity of Cluny was well-known. In one year, food was distributed to more than seven thousand persons in need.

== Reforms of other monasteries ==
After Berno's death, the first monasteries that Odo reformed were at Romainmoutier, St. Michael's Abbey at Tulle, and the Abbey of Saint-Géraud at Aurillac. He encouraged them to return to the original pattern of the Benedictine rule of prayer, manual labor, and community life under the direction of a spiritual father. It was his usual saying that no one can be called a monk who is not a true lover and a strict observer of silence, a condition necessary for interior solitude and the commerce of a soul with God.

Odo would later tell his monks a tale about two monks from Tours who chose not to wear their habits. On one occasion, they were sent out on business. One wore his habit, the other dressed like a layperson. The monk dressed as a layperson fell ill, and the other monk had a vision of St Benedict sitting on a throne in heaven, surrounded by an army of monks. The dying monk was lying prostrate and asking for help. Benedict said that he did not recognize this monk's habit and that he must belong to a different order. Benedict then said he could do nothing as he had no jurisdiction over those of another order. The dying monk despaired, but his companion tore off his habit and wrapped it around the dying monk, and Benedict then healed the dying monk of his sickness.

In 930, he reformed Fleury Abbey. At that time, Fleury held the bones of St Benedict, brought there from Monte Cassino. However, by the time of Odo, it had lost its reputation for holiness and was rife with the same abuses as in other places. The Viking raids had caused monks at Fleury, as in many places, to return to their villages for safety, but when they returned to the monastery, they did not resume their old discipline and violated the Rule. Odo went to Fleury at the request of King Rudolf of the Franks. Upon arriving, he found the monks armed with spears and swords and threatening to murder him. After a three-day standoff, Odo rode towards the monastery on his donkey, and the monks put down their weapons.

Odo then took temporary leadership of it and reformed it. He encountered resistance in trying to get the monks to abide by the rule against eating flesh meat. The monks would patiently wait for the supply of fish to run out, hoping he would be forced to give them meat. However, Odo was always able to find a source for fish. A story from this time held that one day, when Odo was present at Fleury for Benedict's feast day, Benedict appeared to a brother who had fallen asleep. Benedict told the monk that since Fleury was founded, no monk of Fleury had inherited eternal life. Benedict then asked the monk whether they had enough fish. The monk said they did not, and Benedict told him they should fish in the marsh rather than in the river. The monks then went to the marsh to fish and caught a large haul.

Authorized by a privilege of Pope John XI in 931, Odo reformed the monasteries in Aquitaine, northern France, and Italy. The privilege empowered him to unite several abbeys under his supervision and to receive at Cluny monks from abbeys not yet reformed; however, the greater number of the reformed monasteries remained independent, and several became centres of reform. Cluny became the model of monasticism for over a century and transformed the role of piety in European daily life. The monastery claimed its heritage traced, through Berno and Hugh of Anzy le Duc, all the way back to St Benedict of Nursia.

In later years, he also reformed many other monasteries, including St Martial's and St Augustine's monasteries in Limoges, St Jean-d'Angely in Aquitaine, Jumièges Abbey in Normandy, St Peter Le Vif in Sens, and St Julian's in Tours. These monasteries, however, would go on to also reform and found other monasteries. The Cluniac observance, as established by Odo, became the model of monasticism for over a century.

== In Italy ==
Many monasteries in Italy were deserted because of continual attacks by Huns and Muslims, who would often deliberately seek out monasteries to plunder. Local nobles often seized monasteries' lands. Between 936 and 942, he visited Italy several times.

Odo first came to Rome in 936 and took advantage of Alberic II of Spoleto's support to reform and revive monastic life in central Italy. Several Roman monasteries were rebuilt. Odo restored St Paul's Outside the Walls, which became Odo's headquarters in Rome. The palace on the Aventine where Alberic was born was transformed into Our Lady on the Aventine. The monasteries of St Lawrence and St Agnes were restored and reformed. The monks of St Andre's on the Clivus Scaurus resisted a return to the Benedictine Rule, and so they were expelled, and new monks were put in their place. The monastery at Farla, where the monks had completely abandoned the Rule and murdered their own abbot, was also brought under control.

Odo sent his disciple, Baldwin, to Monte Cassino to restore it, as it had been left to lie waste; the nearby Subiaco Abbey also received his influence. Odo became involved in reforms in Naples, Salerno, and Benevento. In the North, St Peter's, Ciel d'Oro in Pavia, was also brought under the control of one of Odo's disciples. St Elias' monastery in Nepi was put under the control of one of Odo's disciples. These monks resisted the rule against eating meat, and Odo's disciple struggled to maintain a steady supply of fish for them to eat. When Odo visited the monastery, a stream miraculously flowed from a nearby mountain, and fish were in it.

Alberic fought a war with his stepfather, Hugh of Lombardy, and Odo was called in twice to mediate between them.

A story holds that once Odo was crossing the Alps in deep snow when his horse lost footing and both he and his horse fell over a cliff, but he caught a tree and held on to its branches until help could come.

Another story held that one time, forty robbers attempted to attack him on the road, but he continued forward singing psalms as usual. One of the robbers then said, "Let us leave them alone, for I never remember having seen such men before. We might overcome the company, but never their armour-bearer, that strenuous man. If we attack them, it will be the worse for us." The other robbers insisted that they would succeed, and then the first robber said, "Then turn your arms against me, for as long as I am alive, no harm shall come to them." The robbers then debated among themselves about what to do, and Odo continued unmolested. The first robber who spoke later became a disciple of Odo.

== Death of Odo ==
In 942, peace returned to Rome between Alberic and his stepfather. He fell ill, and sensing his approaching death, decided to return to Gaul. He stopped at the monastery of St. Julian in Tours for the celebration of the feast day of St. Martin. He developed a fever and, after a lingering sickness, died on 18 November. During his last illness, he composed a hymn in honor of Martin. He was buried in the church of Saint Julian, but the Huguenots burnt the majority of his remains. His feast day is 18 November; the Benedictines observe it on 11 May.

Pope Benedict XVI notes that Odo's austerity as a rigorous reformer tends to obscure a less-obvious trait: a deep, heartfelt kindness. "He was austere, but above all he was good..." His biographer, John of Salerno, records that Odo was in the habit of asking the children he met along the way to sing, and that he would then give them some small token. "[T]he energetic yet at the same time lovable medieval abbot, enthusiastic about reform, with incisive action nourished in his monks, as well as in the lay faithful of his time..."

== Writings ==
Among his writings are: a commentary on the Moralia of Pope Gregory I, a biography of Saint Gerald of Aurillac, three books of Collationes (moral essays, severe and forceful), a few sermons, an epic poem on the Redemption (Occupatio) in several books, three hymns (Rex Christe Martini decus, Martine par apostolis and Martine iam consul poliand), and twelve choral antiphons in honour of Saint Martin of Tours. Some scholars have attributed the Musica enchiriadis to him.

A story holds that once Odo was writing a glossary of the life of St Martin, written by Postumianus and Gallus. The book, however, was left in a cellar that flooded during a rainstorm. A torrent covered the place where the book lay, but the next day, when the monks came down to the cellar, they found that only the margin of the book was soaked through, but all of the writing was untouched. Odo then told the monks, "Why do ye marvel, oh brothers? Know ye not that the water feared to touch the life of the saint?" Then a monk replied, "But see, the book is old and moth-eaten, and has so often been soaked that it is dirty and faint! Can our father then persuade us that the rain feared to touch a book which in the past has been soaked through? Nay, there is another reason." Odo then realized that they were suggesting it was preserved because he had written a glossary in it, but he then quickly gave the glory to God and St Martin.

== Veneration ==
Odo is commemorated in the Catholic Church and the Eastern Orthodox Church:

- 18 November – main commemoration
- 29 April or 11 May – commemoration of four abbots of Cluny (Odo, Maiolus, Odilo(n), Hugh).

== See also ==
- Hugh of Anzy le Duc early reforming abbot
- Cluniac reforms
