= GR 59 =

Footpath in France

Coordinates: 46.6213°N 5.5192°E

GR59
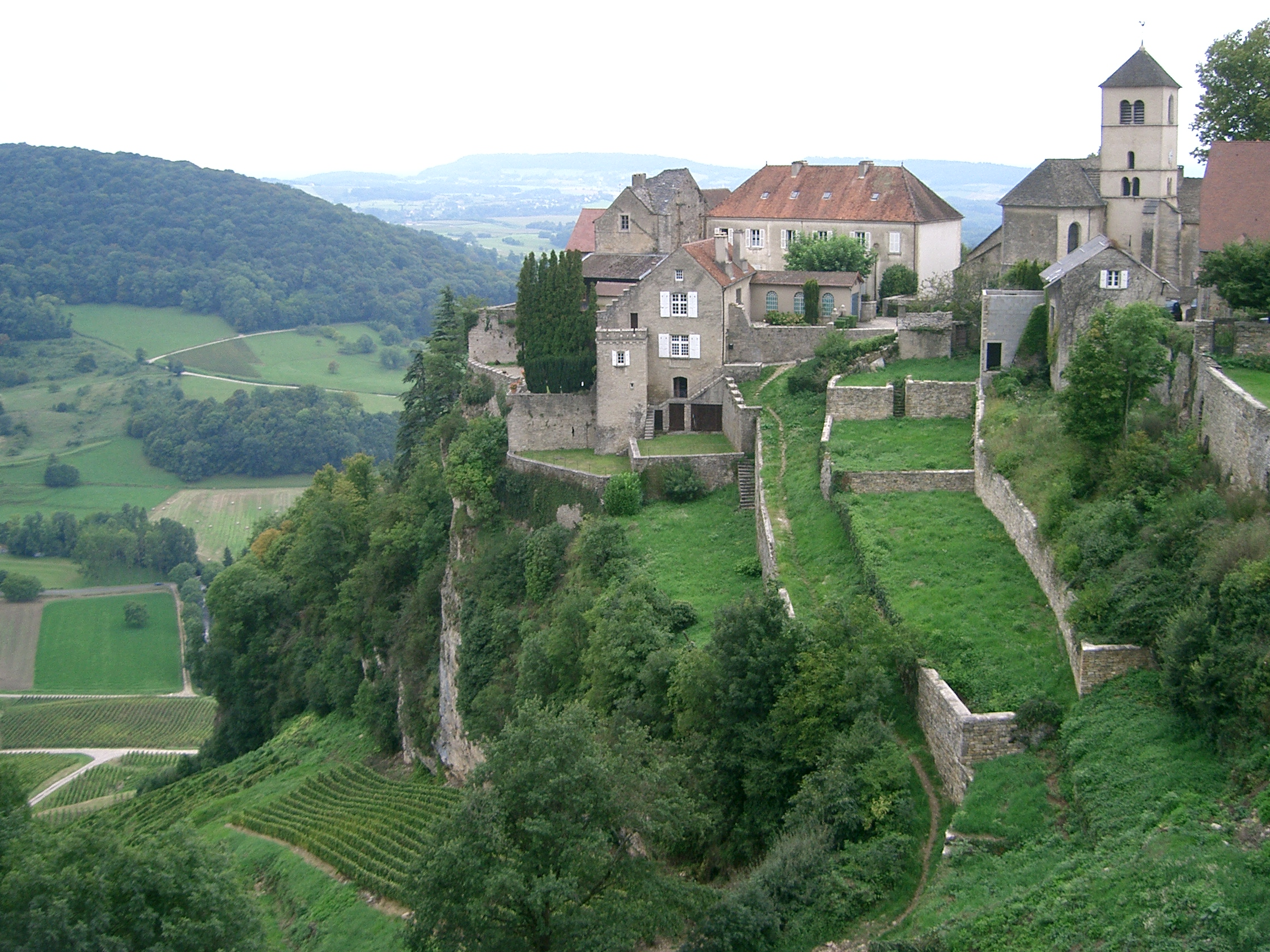
- The village of Château-Chalon
- Location: France
- Designation: GR footpath
- Trailheads: Ballon d'Alsace, Izieu
- Use: Hiking
- Highest point: Ballon d'Alsace, 1,247 m (4,091 ft)
- Difficulty: Easy
- Months: May to October

The GR 59 Grande Randonnée long-distance footpath in France connects two mountain ranges across relatively low-lying terrain. In the north, it begins at Ballon d'Alsace in the Vosges at a height of over 1000m. It loses height rapidly, and runs south-south-west through the département of the Haute-Saône to Besançon on the river Doubs, in the département of the same name. It then follows a circuitous route, partly along the river Loue (a tributary of the Doubs) to Lons-le-Saunier in the département of Jura. At St-Amour just south of Lons, the GR 9 splits from the GR 59 and takes a more easterly route, near the Swiss border, while the GR59 continues into the regions of Bugey and Revermont in the département of Ain, finally rejoining the GR 9 near Yenne on the banks of the Rhône; the GR 9 then continues to the Mediterranean at St-Tropez.

Towns and villages that the path passes through, with approximate heights and distances from the northern end of the path, include:

Ronchamp, 340m, 34Km
Saulnot, 370m, 52Km
Abbenans, 325m, 80Km
Hyèvre-Paroisse, 285m, 104Km
Baume-les-Dames, 291m, 112Km (plus 1Km off the path)
Roulans, 327m, 130Km
Besançon, 247m, 155Km (plus 3.5Km off the path)
Quingey, 265m, 181Km
Salins-les-Bains, 331m, 226Km
Arbois, 306m, 242Km
Poligny, 332m, 270Km
Passenans, 320m, 286.5Km
Château-Chalon, 450m, 296.5Km
Baume-les-Messieurs, 305m, 319Km
Perrigny, 350m, 333Km
Lons-le-Saunier, 250m, 356Km
St-Amour
Saint-Laurent-la-Roche
Treffort
Ambérieu-en-Bugey
Yenne

Detailed guides to the path (in French) are available from the Fédération Française de la Randonnée Pédestre in two sections: No. 510, "Des Vosges au Jura", and No. 901, "Tours et traversées dans l'Ain".
