= Baume-les-Messieurs =

Commune in Bourgogne-Franche-Comté, France

- Commune
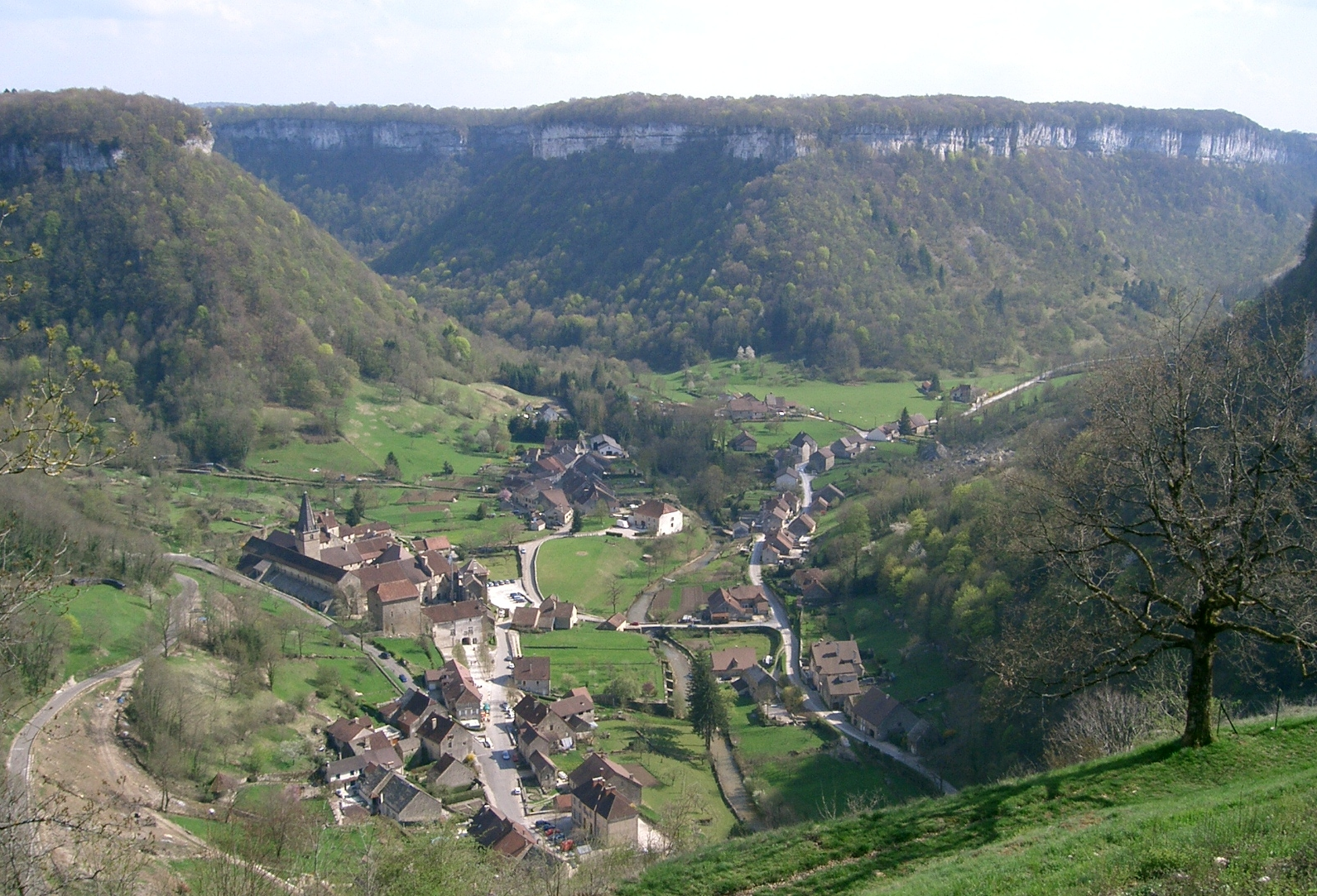
- View of Baume-les-Messieurs

- Coat of arms
- Location of Baume-les-Messieurs
- Location within France Location within Bourgogne-Franche-Comté
- Coordinates: 46°42′31″N 5°38′57″E
- Country: France
- Region: Bourgogne-Franche-Comté
- Department: Jura
- Arrondissement: Lons-le-Saunier
- Canton: Poligny
- Intercommunality: Espace Communautaire Lons Agglomération

Government
  - Mayor (2020–2026): Serge Moreau
- Area^{1}: 13.09 km^{2} (5.05 sq mi)
- Highest elevation: 572 m (1,877 ft)
- Lowest elevation: 277 m (909 ft)
- Population (2023): 160
  - Density: 12/km^{2} (32/sq mi)
- Time zone: UTC+01:00 (CET)
  - Summer (DST): UTC+02:00 (CEST)
- INSEE/Postal code: 39041 /39210
- ^{1} French Land Register data, which excludes lakes, ponds, glaciers > 1 km^{2} (0.386 sq mi or 247 acres) and river estuaries.

Baume-les-Messieurs (French pronunciation: [bom le mesjø]; Arpitan: Bâme) is a commune in the Jura department in the region of Bourgogne-Franche-Comté in eastern France. It is a member of Les Plus Beaux Villages de France (The Most Beautiful Villages of France) Association.

The village lies within the most extensive of the steephead valleys of the Jura escarpment, the Reculée de Baume. It is therefore almost surrounded by limestone cliffs about 200m high. One of the source rivers of the Seille, the Seille de Baume, has its source within the Reculée and flows through the village. A short tributary of the Seille de Baume, the Dard, merges with the Seille at Baume; at the source of the Dard, also within the Reculée, there is a notable series of caves.

The village is dominated by the former Baume Abbey, and in consequence has a significant tourist trade, though this mainly involves day visitors. Conducted tours both of the abbey and of the Dard caves are offered. The GR 59 long-distance footpath passes through the village.

== Population ==
Historical population
Year	Pop.	±% p.a.
1968	231	—
1975	202	−1.90%
1982	174	−2.11%
1990	196	+1.50%
1999	194	−0.11%
2007	196	+0.13%
2012	182	−1.47%
2017	162	−2.30%
2023	160	−0.21%
Source: INSEE

== See also ==
- Baume Abbey
- Communes of the Jura department
