= Athanasios Sakellarios =

Greek educator, scholar and folklorist (1826–1901)

- Αθανάσιος Σακελλάριος
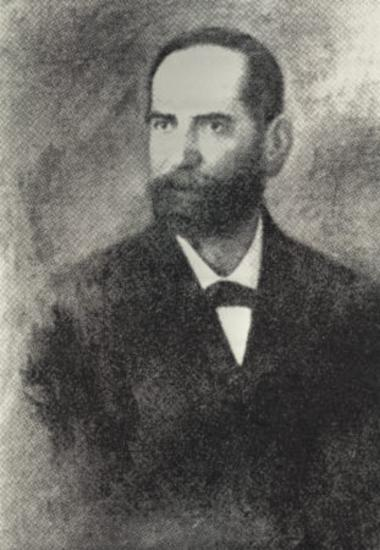

Personal details
- Born: 1826 Agios Petros, Morea Eyalet, Ottoman Empire
- Died: 1901 Athens, Kingdom of Greece
- Education: University of Athens; Leipzig University
- Occupation: Educator; folklorist; scholar

Athanasios Sakellarios (Greek: Αθανάσιος Σακελλάριος; 1826-1901) was a Greek educator, scholar and folklorist. He is considered the founder of Cyprological studies.

== Early life and education ==
Sakellarios was born in Agios Petros in Kynouria in 1826. He studied philology at the University of Athens. In 1876, he graduated with a PhD by the Leipzig University.

== Career ==
Between 1849 and 1854, he was the headmaster of the Greek High School of Larnaca (Σχολή της Λάρνακας). From 1854 to 1867, he taught at a school in Pireaus. Then he went to Athens where he taught at various schools, including Varvakeio. In 1887 he founded his own publishing house, that was continued by his descendants.

Sakellarios travelled extensively around Cyprus and recorded folk songs, games, proverbs, lullabies, myths and traditions. Additionally, he recorded ancient inscriptions, and visited various monuments, archaeological sites and ecclesiastical buildings, offering descriptions of their architecture. His years of work culminated in the edition of the monumental work Τα Κυπριακά (Ta Kypriaka). His first edition was intended to have three volumes, but he managed to publish only volume I (1855), on Cypriot history, geography, archaeology, and III (1868), on the Cypriot Dialect. Later he revised and expanded his work and published it for a second time in two volumes, I (1890) and II (1891).

== Personal life ==
Sakellarios married a Cypriot woman, Aggeliki Demetriou Michalopoulou (Αγγελική Δημητρίου Μιχαλοπούλου) from Larnaca.

== See also ==
- Alexandros Rizos Rangavis
- Konstantinos Sathas
- Simos Menardos

== Publications ==
=== Cypriot history and folklore ===
- Σακελλάριος, A. (1855). Τα Κυπριακά ήτοι, πραγματεία περί γεωγραφίας, αρχαιολογίας, στατιστικής, ιστορίας, μυθολογίας και διαλέκτου της Κύπρου. Τόμος Α'. Εν Αθήναις. Εκ της Τυπογραφίας: Ιω. Αγγελοπόπλου.
- Σακελλάριος, Α. (1868). Τα Κυπριακά. Τόμος Τρίτος, Η εν Κύπρω γλώσσα. Εν Αθήναις: Τύποις Π. Δ. Σακελλάριου.
- Σακελλάριος, A. (1890). Τὰ Κυπριακὰ ἤτοι Γεωγραφία, Ἱστορία καὶ Γλῶσσα τῆς Νήσου Κύπρου. Ὑπὸ Ἀθανασίου Α. Σακελλαρίου Ἁγιοπετρίτου Δ.Φ. καὶ Καθηγητοῦ Τόμος Πρῶτος. Ἐν Ἀθήναις Τύποις καὶ ἀναλώμασι Π. Δ. Σακελλαρίου.
- Σακελλάριος, A. (1891). Τα Kυπριακά ήτοι γεωγραφία, ιστορία και γλώσσα της νήσου Κύπρου από των αρχαιοτάτων χρόνων μέχρι σήμερον. Τόμος Β', η εν Κύπρω γλώσσα. Εν Αθήναις: Τύποις Π. Δ. Σακελλάριου.
- Σακελλάριος, A. (1991). Τα Κυπριακά. Τόμος Α' και Β'. Φωτομηχανική ανατύπωση από το Ίδρυμα Αρχιεπισκόπου Μακαρίου Γ'.

=== Schoolbooks ===
- Σακελλάριος, A. (1851). Γραμματική της Ελληνικής Γλώσσης: Διά τους αρχαρίους.
- Σακελλάριος, Α. (1870). Ελληνική Χρηστομάθεια Εκ των δοκιμωτέρων Ελλήνων Πεζογράφων Μετά σημειώσεων ερμηνευτικών, ιστορικών, γεωγραφικών, κριτικών και λεξιλογίου απάντων των εν τω κειμένω Κυρίων Ονομάτων. Αθήνησι: Τύποις Π. Δ. Σακελλαρίου.
- Σακελλάριος, Α. (1873). Στοιχειώδης Γεωγραφία των παίδων: Ερανισθείσα εκ διαφόρων γεωγραφικών εγχειριδίων Προς χρήσιν των Δημοτικών Σχολείων. Εν Αθήναις: Τύποις «Προόδου.
- Σακελλάριος, Α. (1873). Στοιχειώδης Ελληνική Γραμματική υπό τον τίτλον «Νικώ δ` ο Καρων». : Προς χρήσιν των εν τοις Δημοτικοίς Σχολείοις διδασκομένων παίδων. Αθήναις: Τύποις Π. Δ. Σακελλάριου.
- Σακελλάριος, Α. (1874). Εγχειρίδιον ανωμάλων ρημάτων και ονομάτων πεζών συγγραφέων και ποιητών της ελληνικής γλώσσης Εν οις προσετέθησαν και αι αυτών ετυμολογίαι κατά νέαν όλως μέθοδον. Εν Αθήναις.
- Σακελλάριος, Α. (1877). Ανώμαλα και ελλιπή ρήματα πεζών συγγραφέων και ποιητών της ελληνικής γλώσσης Εν οις προσετέθησαν και αι αυτών ετυμολογίαι. Εν Αθήναις: Τύποις Π. Δ. Σακελλάριου.
