= Dard (river) =

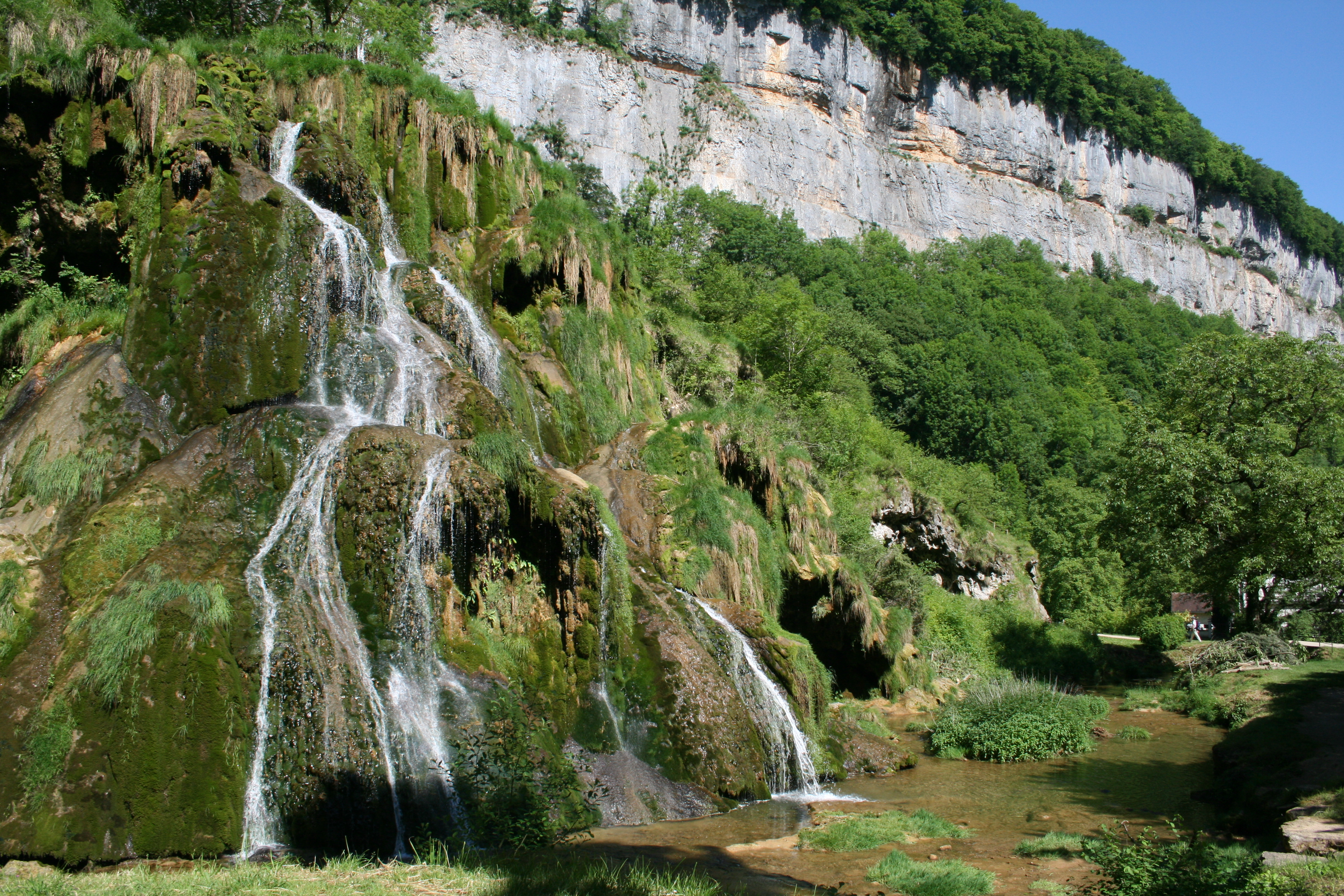
- Waterfall on the River Dard above Baume-les-Messieurs

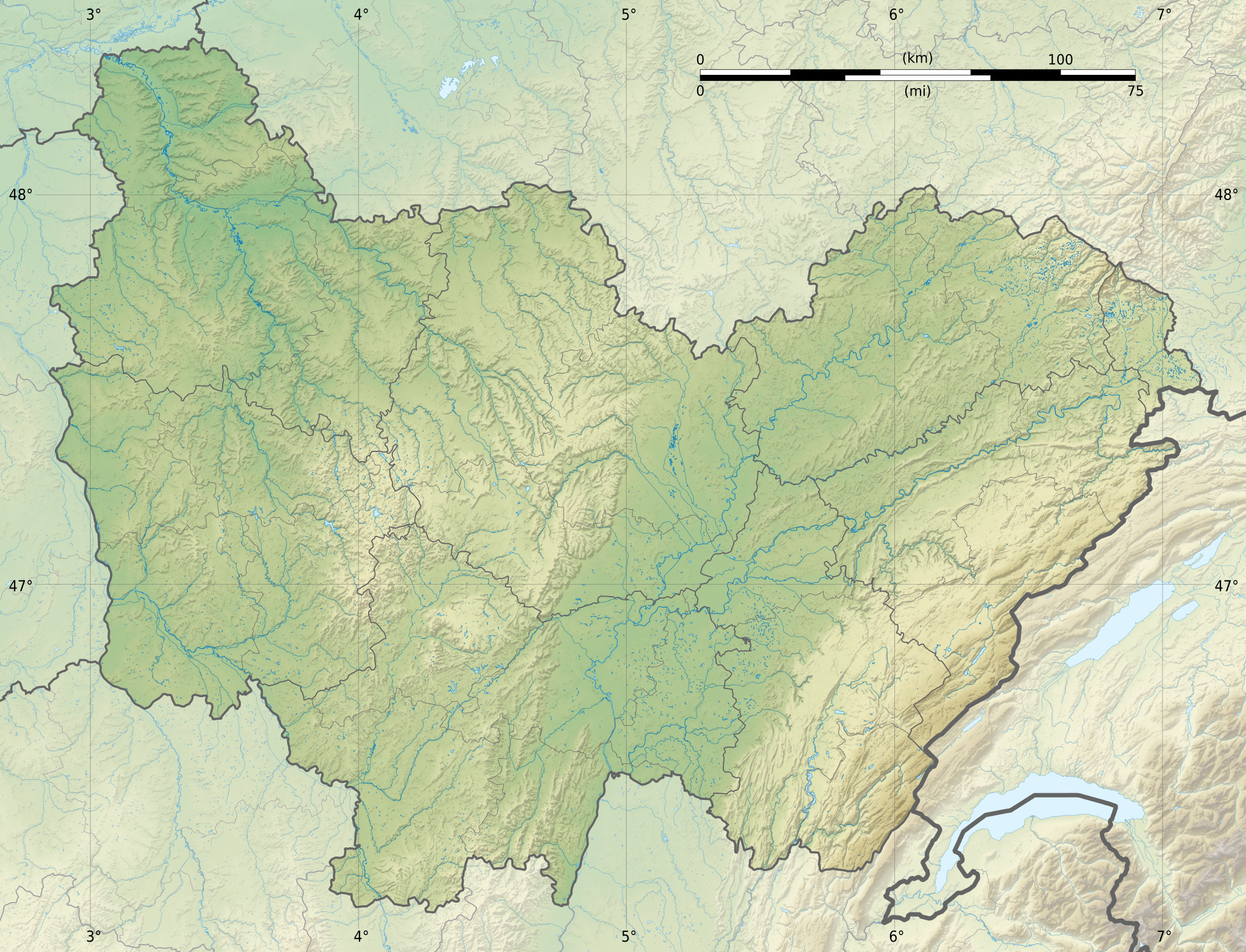
- Location within France Location within Bourgogne-Franche-Comté

Location
- Country: France

Physical characteristics
- Source
  - location: Reculée de Baume, Jura
  - coordinates: 46°41′25″N 5°38′20″E
- Mouth
  - location: Seille de Beaume
  - coordinates: 46°42′21″N 5°38′50″E
- Length: 2.10 km (1.30 mi)

Basin features
- Progression: Seille de Beaume→ Seille→ Saône→ Rhône→ Mediterranean Sea

The Dard is a short (2.1 km) tributary of the Seille de Beaume in the department of Jura in France. The Dard rises in the steephead valley known as the Reculée de Baume, and flows through the valley to the village of Baume-les-Messieurs, where it joins the Seille de Beaume. At its source there is a notable series of show caves, which can be visited.
