= Demetrian =

- Born: Sika, Cyprus
- Died: c. 912; Cyprus
- Venerated in: Roman Catholic Church, Eastern Orthodox Church
- Feast: 6 November
- Patronage: Prisoners

Demetrian (d. 912?) is a saint from Cyprus. In the 9th and 10th centuries, he served the Christian Church as a monk and an abbot, and ultimately as the bishop of the ancient city of Chytri. He is venerated for his apparently miraculous rescue of Christian Cypriots who had been enslaved by Saracen invaders.

== Life ==
Contemporary documentation of Demetrian's life is limited to a single manuscript. Complicating his record, he has at times been called by the common names Demetrio or Demetrius. The lone manuscript holds that Demetrian was the son of a priest, born in a small village named Sika in medieval Cyprus. As a young man, he wed a woman who died only a few months after marriage. After her death, he devoted himself to the Christian Church.

Demetrian served in a monastery dedicated to Saint Anthony, and he was eventually ordained as that institution's abbot, or hegoumenos, a position he is said to have held for forty years. Church leaders then elevated him to bishop of the city of Chytri, but at first he resisted the appointment. Not wanting to exchange his quiet monastic life for a busy episcopal office in the city, he is said to have fled, and was hidden in a cave by a friend. Ultimately, however, his friend became uncomfortable with the situation, and Demetrian was convinced to return to the city and embrace his appointment. He served as bishop of Chytri for some twenty-five years, from 885 until his death, and is acknowledged by the Catholic Encyclopedia as that office's most famous inhabitant.

Near the end of his life, Demetrian saw Cyprus overrun by Saracen invaders. Many Christians were taken captive and marched toward Baghdad to become slaves. Despite his advanced age, Demetrian followed them on the road and pleaded desperately for their release. Seemingly miraculously, the Saracens were persuaded and they released the captives to him.

== Legacy ==
A longstanding devotional following of Saint Demetrian continues through the present day in Cyprus. His annual feast day is celebrated on 6 November.

Venerated as a patron saint of prisoners, Demetrian is also invoked in a more general fashion by a preamble to Catholic prayer: "Loving Father, through the intercession of Saint Demetrian, rescue me from the anxieties that hold me captive".
