= Baume Abbey =

Abbey in Jura, France

Abbaye Saint-Pierre
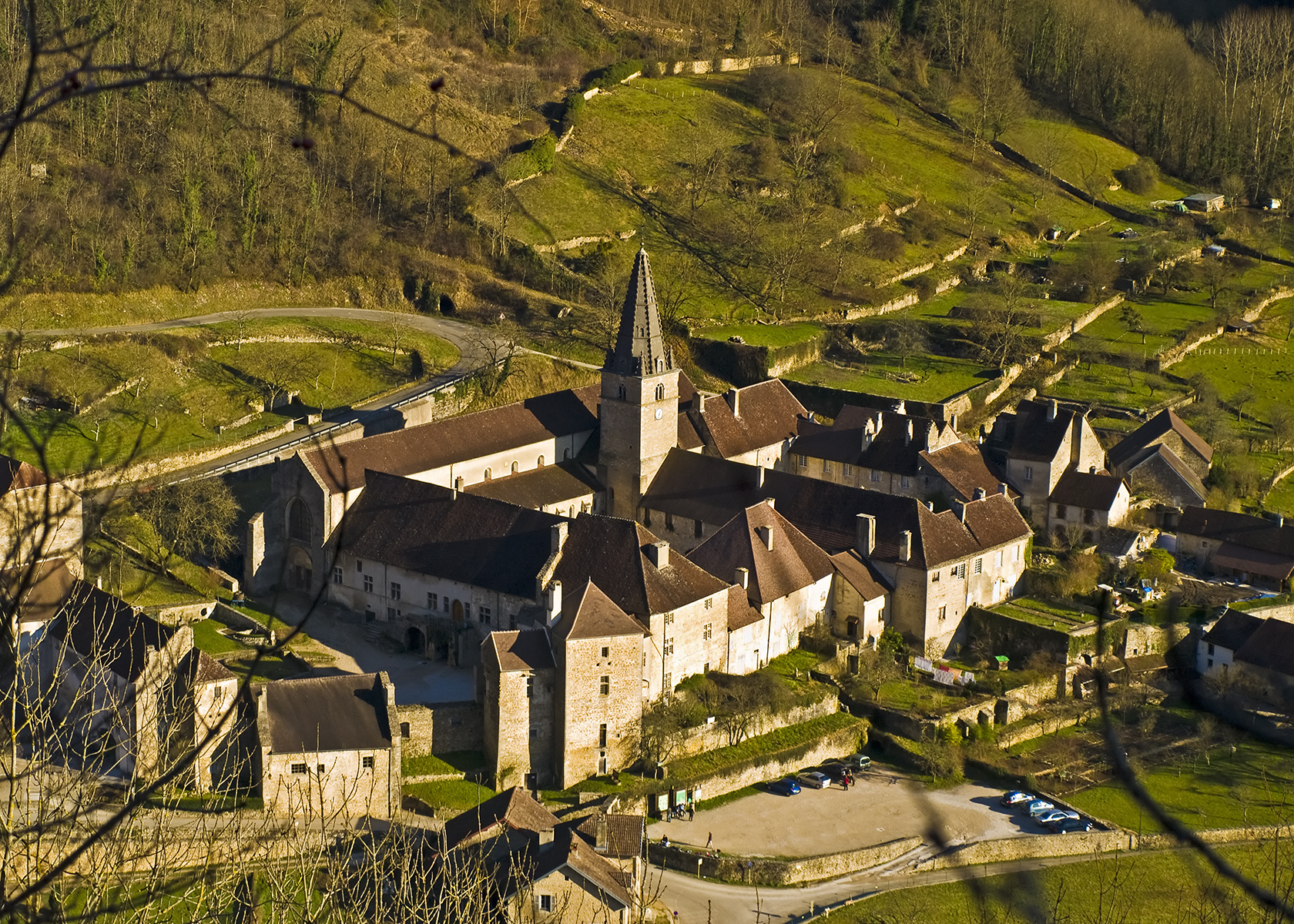
- General view of Baume Abbey

- Location in France

Monastery information
- Full name: Abbaye Saint Pierre
- Order: Benedictine, Cluny
- Denomination: Roman Catholic Church
- Established: AD 869

People
- Founder: Saint Columbanus

Site
- Location: Baume
- Country: France
- Coordinates: 6.7080°N 5.6485°E
- Website: http://www.baumelesmessieurs.fr/abbaye-de-baume-les-messieurs/

Monument historique
- Official name: Abbaye de Baume-les-Messieurs
- Type: Classé
- Designated: 1862
- Reference no.: PA00101814

Baume Abbey is a Benedictine abbey in the village of Baume-les-Messieurs, Jura, France, not far from the still-travelled Roman road linking Besançon and Lyon. It stands near the source of the Dard. The abbey is known for its sixteenth-century retable and early colored glass, and was designated a monument historique by the French government in 1862.

== History ==
=== Early History ===
The origins of the abbey date to as early as the 6th century, when Saint Columbanus which would place the foundation in the late sixth century. Bernard Prost says that in 732 Saracen raiders destroyed the obscure community of monks, along with neighboring Château-Châlon and the village of Lons-le-Saunier. It was refounded during the reign of Louis the Pious in the early ninth century by Saint Eutice, probably a disciple of Benedict of Aniane, who was revitalizing and reordering the Benedictine communities of the Gauls. In 817, when Emperor Louis at Aachen divided the monasteries in his lands into three categories, monasterium Balma was one of only twelve that owed him annual subsidies. However, more recent studies indicate that the first reference to Baume is around 869, and that it was not a Merovingian foundation. George Floyd Duckett suggests that the early traditions may confuse the Abbey of Baume-les-Messieurs with the older Baume-les-Nonnes or Baume-les-Dames. Passing through Besançon on his way to Rome in 869, Lothaire granted Baume and all its lands to Arduic, archbishop of Besançon, but he died before the transfer could take effect. Beaume was among the royal properties that fell to the lot of Louis the German at the division effected in May 870. After the desolation of Burgundy by the Normans, 887—899, once again it had fallen into such desuetude, that its second refounding abbot, Berno, who was later called from Baume to found Cluny Abbey in 910, is generally credited with being its founder, about 890. Berno was confirmed as abbot in 895 by Pope Formosus, who took it and all its lands under the protection of the Holy See, asserting the right of the community to elect their own abbot, and threatening with excommunication any lay lord who might attach its lands and revenues; Berno took the prudent step of placing Baume under the secular patronage of Rudolph I of Burgundy. About 909, Odo with his noble companion Adegrin, found Baume and became a monk, priest, and then superior of the abbey school, bringing with him a library of 100 books.

=== Middle ages ===
The main church was erected during the abbacies of Bernard I (1067-1083) and Alberich (1104-1139). In 1147, Baume was punished for disobedience by Pope Eugenius III for refusing a direct instruction from his Papal Legate. As a result, Baume was reduced from being an independent Abbey to a priory of Cluny; the sentence was later confirmed by Adrian IV. Having been ruined and set on fire in 1336 during the war between the barons of Franche-Comté and Eudes IV of Burgundy, the abbey was subsequently restored and transformed by two prominent abbots: Amé de Chalon (1389–1431) and Henri de Salins (1440–1450) who oversaw extensive construction work.

=== Later History ===
Following the end of the medieval era, the abbey fell under commendam in the 15th century. Likely due to the damage caused by the Thirty Years' War, several of the abbey's communal buildings were abandoned, leading the monks to live independently in individual houses. Following the start of the French Revolution, its cannons were expelled in 1790, and the abbey became national property. Around this time, several buildings, most notably the cloister and monumental staircase of the abbot's residence were demolished. Saint Peter's Church was listed as a historical monument in 1862.

== In popular culture ==
- In the novel Raptor, the protagonist Thorn is born and lives his youth in the Abbey of St. Damian Martyr within a ringed cliff formation known in Gothic as the Balsan Hrinkhen (French: Cirque de Baume; likely based on the formation in Baume-les-Messieurs, where Baume Abbey is located).
