= Hugh of Anzy le Duc =

French Benedictine monk

Hugh of Anzy le Duc OSB (Hugh of Anzy, Hugh of Autun) was a French Benedictine monk, who had a significant influence on monastic reform in the 9th and 10th centuries. He is also known by the name of Hugh of Autun. His birthdate is unknown. He was a native of Poitiers in France. He died in the year 930. He was a friend of Berno of Cluny, the first abbot of the Benedictine monastery at Cluny. His feastday is on April 20.

== Life ==
Hugh of Anzy le Duc was born in Poitiers and educated at the Abbey of Saint-Savin in Poitou, where he became a monk and was ordained a priest. He then went to the monastery of Saint-Pierre at Autun, where he proved himself an effective administrator and reformer. He was then assigned to assist Abbot Arnulf in reforming the Abbey of Saint-Martin, also in Autun. He joined Berno at Baume Abbey, where he assisted in reforming the practice of the monks. It seems that wherever there was a noticeable relaxation of the Rule, Hugh was sent to put things in order. He later helped in organizing Cluny Abbey.

Hugh was later sent from Saint-Savin to become prior of the Priory of the Holy Trinity, the Holy Cross and Sainte-Marie at Anzy-le-Duc, a dependent priory of the Abbey of Saint-Martin in Autun. There he built a hospital. According to his Vita, written in the latter part of the eleventh century, many people flocked to Anzy requesting the holy man's prayers. (Giles Constable points out that the fact that they asked for prayers rather than miracles suggests that this is written from the perspective of someone over a hundred years later.) He spent the last three years of his life living as a virtual hermit, and died at a relatively advanced age.

Hugh was buried in the crypt of the priory church at Anzy-le-Duc, where his grave attracted many pilgrims, and an important cult developed. A new tomb was erected in 1001. In 1025 the relics were taken to the Second Council of Anse, which had been called to settle a dispute between the Abbey of Cluny and the Bishop of Macon.

Blessed Hugh is invoked against storms, based on a story that once he had become terribly angry with a thunderstorm, he threatened it with cross and relics that the hailstones immediately changed in raindrops.

== Relationship to the Founding of Cluny ==
There is a contested medieval story which holds Hugh of Anzy le Duc as one of the agents that helped found Cluny. This story is below.

In the 6th century, when Benedict of Nursia was still alive and running his monastery at Monte Cassino, some important people in Gaul sent messengers to St Benedict asking him to send monks to Gaul to give instruction on how to be monks. Benedict then sent twelve monks, including Saint Maurus who was their leader. Maurus and the other eleven went to Anjou where they founded Glanfeuil Abbey, over which Maurus became abbot. This monastery prospered and the number of monks grew larger over time. However, at some point, Viking raiders came and attacked, thus forcing the monks to abandon the monastery and go further south. They created another monastery named St Savin's in Poitiers. This monastery also flourished and grew in size; the Frankish kings gave their favour to this monastery.

One of the monks, named Badillo, came from St Savin's went to a ruined abbey named after St Martin of Tours in Autun. He restored it and persuaded 18 of the monks from St Savin's to come to the restored monastery of St Martin in Autun. Hugh of Anzy le Duc was one of those monks who came to the new restored monastery at Autun. All of these monks, of course were Benedictine and followed the Rule of St Benedict.

Hugh later became prior and then abbot at this monastery of St Martin in Autun. Under Hugh's leadership, the monastery increased greatly in size and many men came to Autun to take vows. During this time, however, monastic life in Gaul and Germany was not in a good state. This was partly because Viking raids had caused so many monks to abandon their monasteries and many monasteries that continued to exist abandoned the Rule of St Benedict, and became like family fiefdoms.

The monastery at Baume needed reform, and so Hugh sent Berno of Cluny, who was one of the monks at Autun, to go and reform this monastery. Berno then became abbot at Baume, and later in life he would found the monastery at Cluny, while Hugh was still alive.

This story is contradicted by other accounts that claim Berno was never a monk at Autun and he became abbot of Baume after first being abbot of Gigny.

== Sources ==
- Lucy Margaret Smith, The early history of the monastery of Cluny, Oxford University Press, 1920
