= Berno of Cluny =

French Roman Catholic saint

- Born: c. 850
- Died: 13 January 927
- Feast: 13 January

Saint Berno of Cluny (French: Bernon) or Berno of Baume (c. 850 – 13 January 927) was the first abbot of Cluny from its foundation in 909 until he died in 927. He began the tradition of the Cluniac reforms which his successors spread across Europe.

Berno was first a monk at St. Martin's Abbey, Autun, and then at Baume Abbey about 886. In 890, he founded the monastery of Gigny on his own estates, and others at Bourg-Dieu and Massay. In 910, William I of Aquitaine, founder of Cluny, nominated him abbot of the new foundation. Berno placed the monastery under the Benedictine rule (founded by Benedict of Nursia and reformed by Benedict of Aniane).

He resigned as abbot in 925, his abbeys being divided between his relative Vido and his disciple Odo of Cluny.

He is regarded as a saint, with his feast day on 13 January.

== Background ==
St Benedict of Nursia had founded his famous monastery at Monte Cassino in the 5th century, and from it, his ideas and his Rule would come to influence western European monasticism. However, many monasteries were established by teutonic feudal lords intending to retire there at the end of their lives. They tended to relax observance of the Rule according to convenience. Matins were scheduled so as not interrupt sleep. There were no fixed rules on fasting, and it was left to the individual. Many monasteries became like fiefdoms, passed on through the family. Viewed as simply part of the founder's possessions, they could be divided up in inheritance as well. Benedict's rule had provided that the Abbot should be chosen by the monks, but the feudal lord assumed that right. Monks regarded the abbot like a feudal chieftain, and upon his death felt free to leave.

Charlemagne became interested in monasticism because of the opportunities for learning and the preservation of books. He supported the institution, but from the perspective of culture and education. Louis the Pious, Charlemagne's son, commissioned Benedict of Aniane to reform monasticism within the Carolingian empire, to return to what Benedict of Nursia had originally intended. It was decided that the Rule of St Benedict would be enforced in all monasteries, and Benedict of Aniane was given the task of interpreting it and outlining how it should be practiced.

Viking raids of the 9th and 10th centuries left monasteries of Western Europe in great disorder. Buildings suffered destruction and communities had fled seeking safety. Abbeys that survived were often under the control of lay overlords who retained any revenues for themselves. Monks in many abbeys lived in poverty or left. Bishops meeting in 909 in the diocese of Soissons, received reports of lay abbots living in monasteries with their families, guards, and dogs.

It was in this context that Berno of Cluny lived. Berno was concerned with reforming of the monasteries in accordance with the original Rule of St Benedict. He founded a monastery on his own land, and after the fame of his good administration of that monastery spread, he was asked to reform other monasteries as well.

== Abbot of Baume ==
Berno was born about the year 850 to a noble family in Burgundy. His father may have been the French nobleman Odon, who gave a refuge for the Benedictine community from Glanfeuil Abbey after the monks had been driven from the monastery by Norman attacks in 862. Berno joined the Benedictine Abbey of St. Martin at Autun, where Hugh of Anzy le Duc had introduced stricter adherence to the Rule of Saint Benedict. Later, Berno was sent to restore the monastery of Baume-les-Messieurs in the diocese of Besançon, which had fallen into neglect.

In 890 he established, with his own funds, the monastery of St. Peter at Gigny in the Jura Mountains and became its first abbot. In this he was supported by Rudolph I of Burgundy In 894, Berno travelled to Rome and got papal approval for the charter of Gigny. The monasteries at Gigny and Baume followed the rule as interpreted by Benedict of Aniane, who had sought to restore the primitive strictness of the monastic observance wherever it had been relaxed. The rule focused on prayer, silence, and solitude.

Another account states that Berno was sent to Baume by Abbot Hugh of Autun. This monastery prospered and many monks came there to take vows. His reputation for holiness grew, and he was then asked to take over the leadership of Baume in order to reform it. Berno thus became abbot of Baume and restored this monastery's former reputation for holiness, A second story is supported by later charters that show Baume was dependent upon Gigny. However, it is also possible that Berno took over Gigny's leadership after being abbot of Baume, rather than the other way around.

== Founding of Cluny ==
It was common at this time that monasteries would be founded with patrons who would provide the financial capital needed to create and sustain the monastery, and in return for the monks prayers.

One account states that when Berno was abbot of Baume, he had such a good reputation, that William of Aquitaine gave him the monasteries at Deols and Massay. William was acquainted with Berno when he was abbot of Baume, and was supportive of the reformers who wanted to bring monasticism back to a stricter observance of the Benedictine rule. The Duke wanted to found a new monastery and asked Berno to be abbot. One story holds that when William asked Berno where the monastery should be founded, Berno asked the Duke to donate his favourite hunting lodge in Cluny; thereby making a sacrifice on his own part. The Duke protested and said, "Impossible, I cannot have my dogs removed“， and Berno then answered, "Drive out the dogs and put monks in their place, for thou canst well think what reward God will give thee for dogs, and what for monks." William gave part of his fiefdom of Cluny to Berno for the monastery. The founding of the monastery is dated to 11 September 909.

William guaranteed that the monastery would be free from control by him, his successors or any other temporal power, and it was placed under the direct authority of the Pope in Rome, who accepted Cluny's charter. This was very important for the later history of the abbey, because it meant that no local bishop, who himself might have been against Cluny's Benedictine reform movement within the church, had the authority to stop Cluny from carrying out its work, since Cluny was under the protection of the Pope.

The Benedictine rule was to be strictly followed. Cluny in return would pay a sum of 10 solidi of gold every five years to the Pope. Anyone who violated the charter that placed Cluny under Rome, was to be subject to a terrible curse including eternal hellfire. The apostles Peter and Paul were called upon to be the guardians of Cluny.

== Berno's Death ==
Berno administered six monasteries by the time he died, which were at Gigny, Baume, the abbey of Aethicens with the cella of St Lautenus, Deols, Massay and Cluny. Before he died he gave three monasteries, namely Gigny, Baume and Aethicens to one of his monks named Wido, and the other three he gave to another monk named Odo (later St Odo of Cluny). He urged his monks on his deathbed to continue to stay true to the Benedictine Rule, which had been so often violated by many other monasteries, and to follow all the rules regarding silence, food and drink, ritual, and most importantly the abandonment of personal possessions.

After Berno died, Wido attempted to take Cluny away from Odo, but Pope John X intervened in Odo's favour in the year 928.

== Sources ==
- Friedrich Wilhelm Bautz (1975). "Berno of Cluny". In Bautz, Friedrich Wilhelm (ed.). Biographisch-Bibliographisches Kirchenlexikon (BBKL) (in German). Vol. 1. Hamm: Bautz. col. 542. ISBN 3-88309-013-1.
- Catholic.org: Saints
- Lucy Margaret Smith, The early history of the monastery of Cluny, Oxford University Press, 1920
