= Christianity in the 19th century =

Characteristic of Christianity in the 19th century were evangelical revivals in some largely Protestant countries and later the effects of modern biblical scholarship on the churches. Liberal or modernist theology was one consequence of this. In Europe, the Catholic Church strongly opposed liberalism and culture wars launched in Germany, Italy, Belgium and France. It strongly emphasized personal piety. In Europe there was a general move away from religious observance and belief in Christian teachings and a move towards secularism. In Protestantism, pietistic revivals were common.

== Modernism in Christian theology ==
As the more radical implications of the scientific and cultural influences of the Enlightenment began to be felt in the Protestant churches, especially in the 19th century, Liberal Christianity, exemplified especially by numerous theologians in Germany in the 19th century, sought to bring the churches alongside of the broad revolution that modernism represented. In doing so, new critical approaches to the Bible were developed, new attitudes became evident about the role of religion in society, and a new openness to questioning the nearly universally accepted definitions of Christian orthodoxy began to become obvious.

In reaction to these developments, Christian fundamentalism was a movement to reject the radical influences of philosophical humanism, as this was affecting the Christian religion. Especially targeting critical approaches to the interpretation of the Bible and trying to blockade the inroads made into their churches by atheistic scientific assumptions, the fundamentalists began to appear in various denominations as numerous independent movements of resistance to the drift away from historic Christianity. Over time, the Fundamentalist Evangelical movement has divided into two main wings, with the label Fundamentalist following one branch, while Evangelical has become the preferred banner of the more moderate movement. Although both movements primarily originated in the English speaking world, the majority of Evangelicals now live elsewhere in the world.

After the Reformation, Protestant groups continued to splinter, leading to a range of new theologies. The Enthusiasts were so named because of their emotional zeal. These included the Methodists, the Quakers, and the Baptists. Another group sought to reconcile Christian faith with modernist ideas, sometimes causing them to reject beliefs they considered to be illogical, including the Nicene Creed and Chalcedonian Creed. These included Unitarians and Universalists. A major issue for Protestants became the degree to which people contribute to their salvation. The debate is often viewed as synergism versus monergism, though the labels Calvinist and Arminian are more frequently used, referring to the conclusion of the Synod of Dort.

The 19th century saw the rise of Biblical criticism, new knowledge of religious diversity in other continents, and above all the growth of science. This led many Christians to emphasize the brotherhood, to seeing miracles as myths, and to emphasize a moral approach with religion as lifestyle rather than revealed truth.

=== Liberal Christianity ===
Liberal Christianity—sometimes called liberal theology—reshaped Protestantism. Liberal Christianity is an umbrella term covering diverse, philosophically informed movements and moods within 19th and 20th century Christianity. Despite its name, liberal Christianity has always been thoroughly protean. The word liberal in liberal Christianity does not refer to leftist politics but rather to insights developed during the Age of Enlightenment. Generally speaking, Enlightenment-era liberalism held that people are political creatures and that liberty of thought and expression should be their highest value. The development of liberal Christianity owes a lot to the works of theologian Friedrich Schleiermacher. As a whole, liberal Christianity is a product of a continuing philosophical dialogue.

== Protestant Europe ==
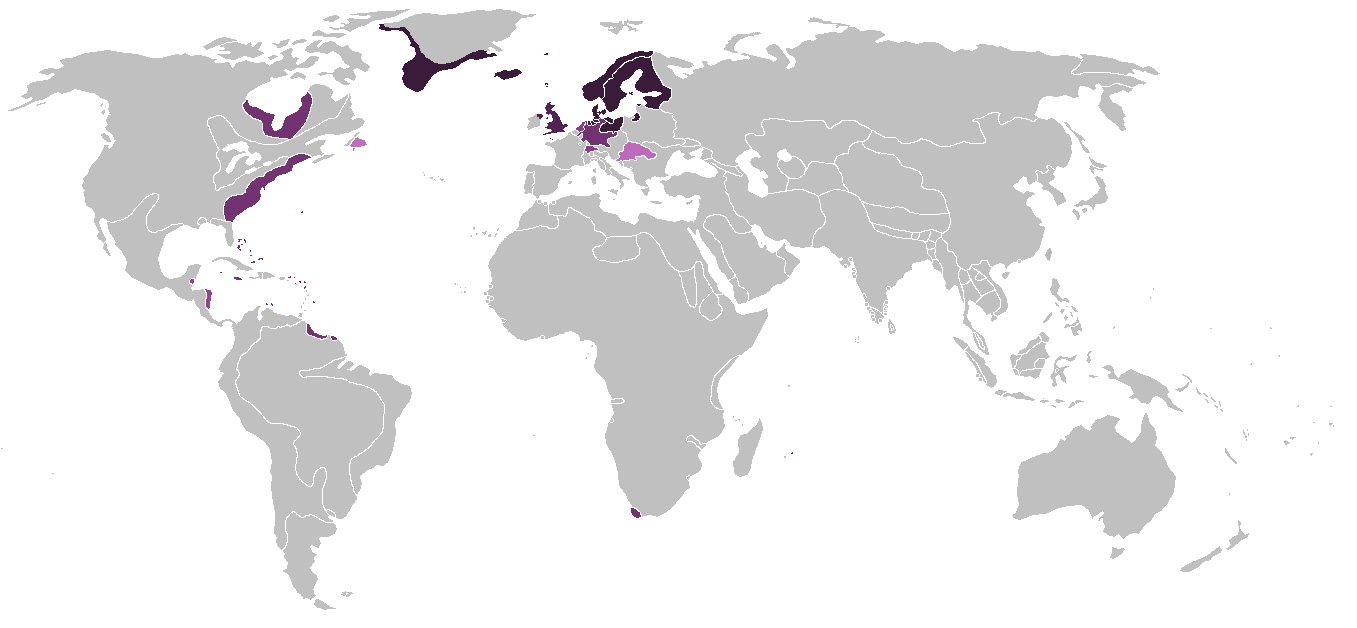
Global Protestantism, 1710

Historian Kenneth Scott Latourette argues that the outlook for Protestantism at the start of the 19th century was discouraging. It was a regional religion based in northwestern Europe, with an outpost in the sparsely settled United States. It was closely allied with government, as in Scandinavia, the Netherlands, Prussia, and especially Great Britain. The alliance came at the expense of independence, as the government made the basic policy decisions, down to such details as the salaries of ministers and location of new churches. The dominant intellectual currents of the Enlightenment promoted rationalism, and most Protestant leaders preached a sort of deism. Intellectually, the new methods of historical and anthropological study undermine automatic acceptance of biblical stories, as did the sciences of geology and biology. Industrialization was a strongly negative factor, as workers who moved to the city seldom joined churches. The gap between the church and the unchurched grew rapidly, and secular forces, based both in socialism and liberalism undermine the prestige of religion. Despite the negative forces, Protestantism demonstrated a striking vitality by 1900. Shrugging off Enlightenment rationalism, Protestants embraced romanticism, with the stress on the personal and the invisible. Entirely fresh ideas as expressed by Friedrich Schleiermacher, Soren Kierkegaard, Albrecht Ritschl and Adolf von Harnack restored the intellectual power of theology. There was more attention to historic creeds such as the Augsburg, the Heidelberg, and the Westminster confessions. The stirrings of pietism on the Continent, and evangelicalism in Britain expanded enormously, leading the devout away from an emphasis on formality and ritual and toward an inner sensibility toward personal relationship to Christ. Social activities, in education and in opposition to social vices such as slavery, alcoholism and poverty provided new opportunities for social service. Above all, worldwide missionary activity became a highly prized goal, proving quite successful in close cooperation with the imperialism of the British, German, and Dutch empires.

=== Britain ===
In England, Anglicans emphasized the historically Catholic components of their heritage, as the High Church element reintroduced vestments and incense into their rituals, against the opposition of Low Church evangelicals. As the Oxford Movement began to advocate restoring traditional Catholic faith and practice to the Church of England (see Anglo-Catholicism), there was felt to be a need for a restoration of the monastic life. Anglican priest John Henry Newman established a community of men at Littlemore near Oxford in the 1840s. From then forward, there have been many communities of monks, friars, sisters, and nuns established within the Anglican Communion. In 1848, Mother Priscilla Lydia Sellon founded the Anglican Sisters of Charity and became the first woman to take religious vows within the Anglican Communion since the English Reformation. In October 1850, the first building specifically built for the purpose of housing an Anglican Sisterhood was consecrated at Abbeymere in Plymouth. It housed several schools for the destitute, a laundry, printing press, and a soup kitchen. From the 1840s and throughout the following hundred years, religious orders for both men and women proliferated in Britain, America and elsewhere.

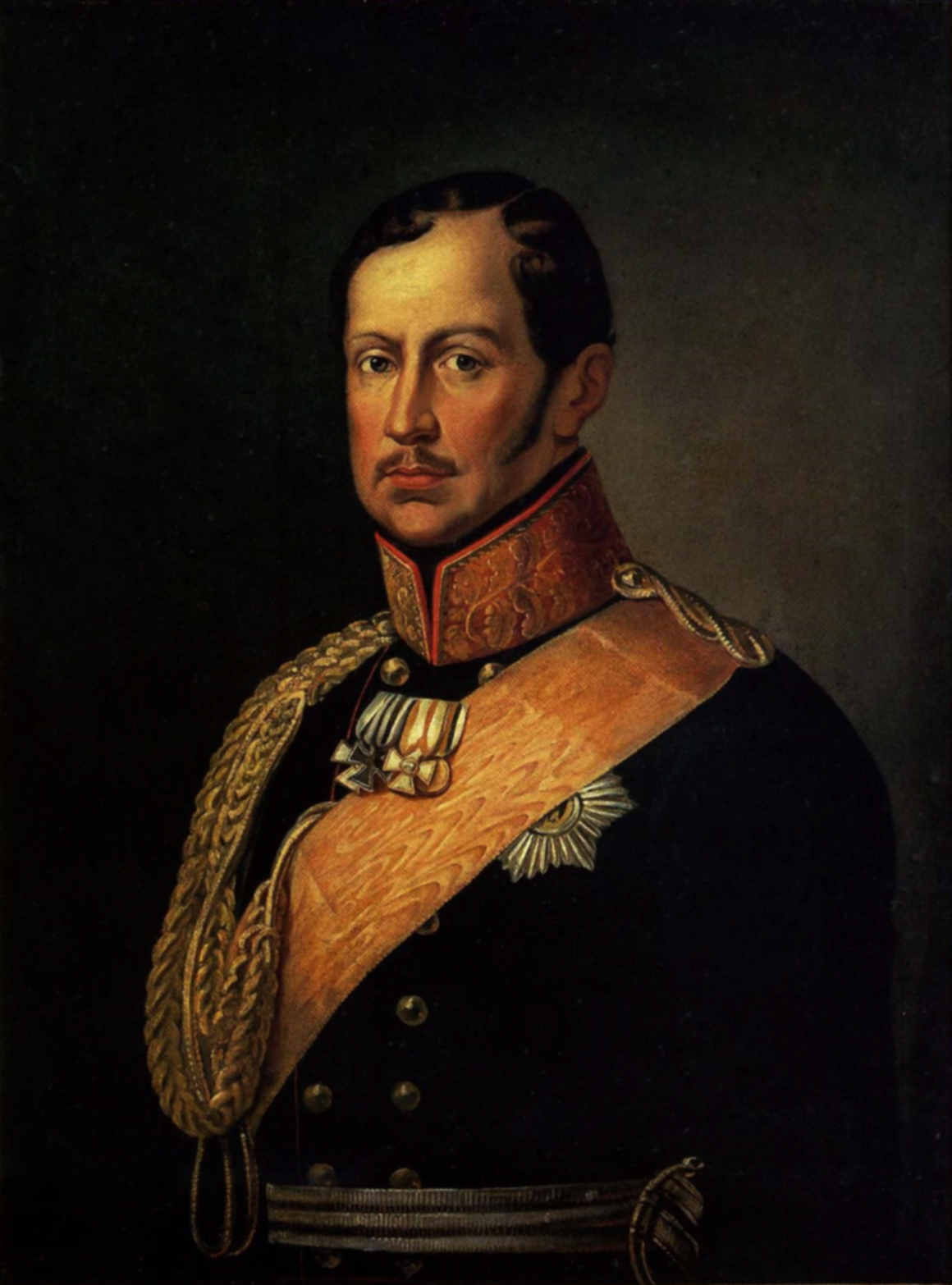
King Frederick William III ruled Prussia 1797 to 1840

=== Germany ===
Two main developments reshaped religion in Germany. Across the land, there was a movement to unite the larger Lutheran and the smaller Reformed Protestant churches. The churches themselves brought this about in Baden, Nassau, and Bavaria. However, in Prussia, King Frederick William III was determined to handle unification entirely on his own terms, without consultation. His goal was to unify the Protestant churches, and to impose a single standardized liturgy, organization, and even architecture. The long-term goal was to have fully centralized royal control of all the Protestant churches. In a series of proclamations over several decades the Church of the Prussian Union was formed, bringing together the more numerous Lutherans, and the less numerous Reformed Protestants. The government of Prussia now had full control over church affairs, with the king himself recognized as the leading bishop. Opposition to unification came from the "Old Lutherans" in Silesia who clung tightly to the theological and liturgical forms they had followed since the days of Martin Luther. The government attempted to crack down on them, so they went underground. Tens of thousands migrated, to South Australia, and especially to the United States, where they formed what is now the Lutheran Church–Missouri Synod, which remains a conservative denomination. Finally, in 1845, the new king, Frederick William IV, offered a general amnesty and allowed the Old Lutherans to form a separate church association with only nominal government control.

From the religious point of view of the typical Catholic or Protestant, major changes were underway in terms of a much more personalized religiosity that focused on the individual more than the church or the ceremony. The rationalism of the late 19th century faded away, and there was a new emphasis on the psychology and feeling of the individual, especially in terms of contemplating sinfulness, redemption, and the mysteries and the revelations of Christianity. Pietistic revivals were common among Protestants.

== American trends ==
The main trends in Protestantism included the rapid growth of Methodist and Baptists denominations, and the steady growth among Presbyterians, Congregationalists and Anglicans. After 1830 German Lutherans arrived in large numbers; after 1860 Scandinavian Lutherans arrived. The Pennsylvania Dutch Protestant sects (and Lutherans) grew through high birth rates.

=== Second Great Awakening ===
The Second Great Awakening (1790-1840s) was the second great religious revival in America. Unlike the First Great Awakening of the 18th century, it focused on the unchurched and sought to instill in them a deep sense of personal salvation as experienced in revival meetings. It also sparked the beginnings of groups such as the Mormons and the Holiness movement. Leaders included Asahel Nettleton, Edward Payson, James Brainerd Taylor, Charles Grandison Finney, Lyman Beecher, Barton W. Stone, Peter Cartwright, and James Finley.

In New England, the renewed interest in religion inspired a wave of social activism. In western New York, the spirit of revival encouraged the emergence of the Restoration Movement, the Latter Day Saint movement, Adventism, and the Holiness movement. Especially in the west—at Cane Ridge, Kentucky and in Tennessee—the revival strengthened the Methodists and the Baptists and introduced into America a new form of religious expression—the Scottish camp meeting.

The Second Great Awakening made its way across the frontier territories, fed by intense longing for a prominent place for God in the life of the new nation, a new liberal attitude toward fresh interpretations of the Bible, and a contagious experience of zeal for authentic spirituality. As these revivals spread, they gathered converts to Protestant sects of the time. The revivals eventually moved freely across denominational lines with practically identical results and went farther than ever toward breaking down the allegiances which kept adherents to these denominations loyal to their own. Consequently, the revivals were accompanied by a growing dissatisfaction with Evangelical churches and especially with the doctrine of Calvinism, which was nominally accepted or at least tolerated in most Evangelical churches at the time. Various unaffiliated movements arose that were often restorationist in outlook, considering contemporary Christianity of the time to be a deviation from the true, original Christianity. These groups attempted to transcend Protestant denominationalism and orthodox Christian creeds to restore Christianity to its original form.

Barton W. Stone, founded a movement at Cane Ridge, Kentucky; they called themselves simply Christians. The second began in western Pennsylvania and was led by Thomas Campbell and his son, Alexander Campbell; they used the name Disciples of Christ. Both groups sought to restore the whole Christian church on the pattern set forth in the New Testament, and both believed that creeds kept Christianity divided. In 1832 they merged.

=== Mormonism ===
The Mormon faith emerged from the Latter Day Saint movement in upstate New York in the 1830s. After several schisms and multiple relocations to escape intense hostility, the largest group, The Church of Jesus Christ of Latter-day Saints (LDS Church), migrated to Utah Territory. They established a theocracy under Brigham Young, and came into conflict with the United States government. It tried to suppress the church because of its polygamy and theocracy. Compromises were finally reached in the 1890s, allowing the church to abandon polygamy and flourish.

=== Adventism ===
Adventism is a Christian eschatological belief that looks for the imminent Second Coming of Jesus to inaugurate the Kingdom of God. This view involves the belief that Jesus will return to receive those who have died in Christ and those who are awaiting his return, and that they must be ready when he returns. The Millerites, the most well-known family of the Adventist movements, were the followers of the teachings of William Miller, who, in 1833, first shared publicly his belief in the coming Second Advent of Jesus Christ in c.1843. They emphasized apocalyptic teachings anticipating the end of the world and did not look for the unity of Christendom but busied themselves in preparation for Christ's return. From the Millerites descended the Seventh-day Adventists and the Advent Christian Church. The Seventh-day Adventist Church is the largest of several Adventist groups which arose from the Millerite movement of the 1840s. Miller predicted on the basis of Daniel 8:14–16 and the day-year principle that Jesus Christ would return to Earth on 22 October 1844. When this did not happen, most of his followers disbanded and returned to their original churches.

=== Holiness movement ===
The Methodists of the 19th century continued the interest in Christian holiness that had been started by their founder, John Wesley. In 1836 two Methodist women, Sarah Worrall Lankford and Phoebe Palmer, started the Tuesday Meeting for the Promotion of Holiness in New York City. A year later, Methodist minister Timothy Merritt founded a journal called the Guide to Christian Perfection to promote the Wesleyan message of Christian holiness.

In 1837, Palmer experienced what she called entire sanctification. She began leading the Tuesday Meeting for the Promotion of Holiness. At first only women attended these meetings, but eventually Methodist bishops and other clergy members began to attend them also. In 1859, she published The Promise of the Father, in which she argued in favor of women in ministry, later to influence Catherine Booth, co-founder of the Salvation Army. The practice of ministry by women became common but not universal within the branches of the holiness movement.

The first distinct "holiness" camp meeting convened in Vineland, New Jersey in 1867 and attracted as many as 10,000 people. Ministers formed the National Camp Meeting Association for the Promotion of Holiness and agreed to conduct a similar gathering the next year. Later, this association became the Christian Holiness Partnership. The third National Camp Meeting met at Round Lake, New York. This time the national press attended, and write-ups appeared in numerous papers. Robert and Hannah Smith were among those who took the holiness message to England, and their ministries helped lay the foundation for the Keswick Convention.

In the 1870s, the holiness movement spread to Great Britain, where it was sometimes called the Higher Life movement after the title of William Boardman's book, The Higher Life. Higher Life conferences were held at Broadlands and Oxford in 1874 and in Brighton and Keswick in 1875. The Keswick Convention soon became the British headquarters for the movement. The Faith Mission in Scotland was one consequence of the British holiness movement. Another was a flow of influence from Britain back to the United States. In 1874, Albert Benjamin Simpson read Boardman's Higher Christian Life and felt the need for such a life himself. He went on to found the Christian and Missionary Alliance.

=== Third Great Awakening ===
The Third Great Awakening was a period of religious activism in American history from the late 1850s to the 20th century. It affected pietistic Protestant denominations and had a strong sense of social activism. It gathered strength from the postmillennial theology that the Second Coming of Christ would come after humankind had reformed the entire earth. The Social Gospel Movement gained its force from the awakening, as did the worldwide missionary movement. New groupings emerged, such as the Holiness and Nazarene movements, and Christian Science. Significant names include Dwight L. Moody, Ira D. Sankey, William Booth and Catherine Booth (founders of the Salvation Army), Charles Spurgeon, and James Caughey. Hudson Taylor began the China Inland Mission and Thomas John Barnardo founded his famous orphanages.

Mary Baker Eddy introduced Christian Science, which gained a national following. In 1880, the Salvation Army denomination arrived in America. Although its theology was based on ideals expressed during the Second Great Awakening, its focus on poverty was of the Third. The Society for Ethical Culture, established in New York in 1876 by Felix Adler, attracted a Reform Jewish clientele. Charles Taze Russell founded a Bible Student movement now known as the Jehovah's Witnesses.

== Roman Catholicism ==
=== France ===
The Catholic Church lost all its lands and buildings during the French Revolution, and these were sold off or came under the control of local governments. The more radical elements of the Revolution tried to suppress the church, but Napoleon came to a compromise with the pope in the Concordat of 1801 that restored much of its status. The bishop still ruled his diocese (which was aligned with the new department boundaries), but could only communicate with the pope through the government in Paris. Bishops, priests, nuns and other religious people were paid salaries by the state. All the old religious rites and ceremonies were retained, and the government maintained the religious buildings. The Church was allowed to operate its own seminaries and to some extent local schools as well, although this became a central political issue into the 20th century. Bishops were much less powerful than before, and had no political voice. However, the Catholic Church reinvented itself and put a new emphasis on personal religiosity that gave it a hold on the psychology of the faithful.

France remained basically Catholic. The 1872 census counted 36 million people, of whom 35.4 million were listed as Catholics, 600,000 as Protestants, 50,000 as Jews and 80,000 as freethinkers. The Revolution failed to destroy the Catholic Church, and Napoleon's concordat of 1801 restored its status. The return of the Bourbons in 1814 brought back many rich nobles and landowners who supported the Church, seeing it as a bastion of conservatism and monarchism. However the monasteries with their vast land holdings and political power were gone; much of the land had been sold to urban entrepreneurs who lacked historic connections to the land and the peasants.

Few new priests were trained in the 1790–1814 period, and many left the church. The result was that the number of parish clergy plunged from 60,000 in 1790 to 25,000 in 1815, many of them elderly. Entire regions, especially around Paris, were left with few priests. On the other hand, some traditional regions held fast to the faith, led by local nobles and historic families.

The comeback was very slow in the larger cities and industrial areas. With systematic missionary work and a new emphasis on liturgy and devotions to the Virgin Mary, plus support from Napoleon III, there was a comeback. In 1870 there were 56,500 priests, representing a much younger and more dynamic force in the villages and towns, with a thick network of schools, charities and lay organizations. Conservative Catholics held control of the national government, 1820–1830, but most often played secondary political roles or had to fight the assault from republicans, liberals, socialists and seculars.

Throughout the lifetime of the Third Republic (1870–1940) there were battles over the status of the Catholic Church. The French clergy and bishops were closely associated with the Monarchists and many of its hierarchy were from noble families. Republicans were based in the anticlerical middle class who saw the Church's alliance with the monarchists as a political threat to republicanism, and a threat to the modern spirit of progress. The Republicans detested the church for its political and class affiliations; for them, the church represented outmoded traditions, superstition and monarchism.

The Republicans were strengthened by Protestant and Jewish support. Numerous laws were passed to weaken the Catholic Church. In 1879, priests were excluded from the administrative committees of hospitals and of boards of charity. In 1880, new measures were directed against the religious congregations. From 1880 to 1890 came the substitution of lay women for nuns in many hospitals. Napoleon's 1801 Concordat continued in operation but in 1881, the government cut off salaries to priests it disliked.

The 1882 school laws of Republican Jules Ferry set up a national system of public schools that taught strict puritanical morality but no religion. For a while privately funded Catholic schools were tolerated. Civil marriage became compulsory, divorce was introduced and chaplains were removed from the army.

When Leo XIII became pope in 1878 he tried to calm Church-State relations. In 1884 he told French bishops not to act in a hostile manner to the State. In 1892 he issued an encyclical advising French Catholics to rally to the Republic and defend the Church by participating in Republican politics. This attempt at improving the relationship failed.

Deep-rooted suspicions remained on both sides and were inflamed by the Dreyfus Affair. Catholics were for the most part anti-dreyfusard. The Assumptionists published anti-Semitic and anti-republican articles in their journal La Croix. This infuriated Republican politicians, who were eager to take revenge. Often they worked in alliance with Masonic lodges. The Waldeck-Rousseau Ministry (1899–1902) and the Combes Ministry (1902–05) fought with the Vatican over the appointment of bishops.

Chaplains were removed from naval and military hospitals (1903–04), and soldiers were ordered not to frequent Catholic clubs (1904). Combes as Prime Minister in 1902, was determined to thoroughly defeat Catholicism. He closed down all parochial schools in France. Then he had parliament reject authorisation of all religious orders. This meant that all fifty four orders were dissolved and about 20,000 members immediately left France, many for Spain.

In 1905 the 1801 Concordat was abrogated; Church and State were separated. All Church property was confiscated. Public worship was given over to associations of Catholic laymen who controlled access to churches. In practise, Masses and rituals continued. The Church was badly hurt and lost half its priests. In the long run, however, it gained autonomy—for the State no longer had a voice in choosing bishops and Gallicanism was dead.

=== Germany ===
Among Catholics there was a sharp increase in popular pilgrimages. In 1844 alone, half a million pilgrims made a pilgrimage to the city of Trier in the Rhineland to view the Seamless robe of Jesus, said to be the robe that Jesus wore on the way to his crucifixion. Catholic bishops in Germany had historically been largely independent of Rome, but now the Vatican exerted increasing control, a new "ultramontanism" of Catholics highly loyal to Rome. A sharp controversy broke out in 1837–38 in the largely Catholic Rhineland over the religious education of children of mixed marriages, where the mother was Catholic and the father Protestant. The government passed laws to require that these children always be raised as Protestants, contrary to Napoleonic law that had previously prevailed and allowed the parents to make the decision. It put the Catholic Archbishop under house arrest. In 1840, the new King Frederick William IV sought reconciliation and ended the controversy by agreeing to most of the Catholic demands. However, the incident led to lasting Catholic distrust of the government.

==== Kulturkampf ====
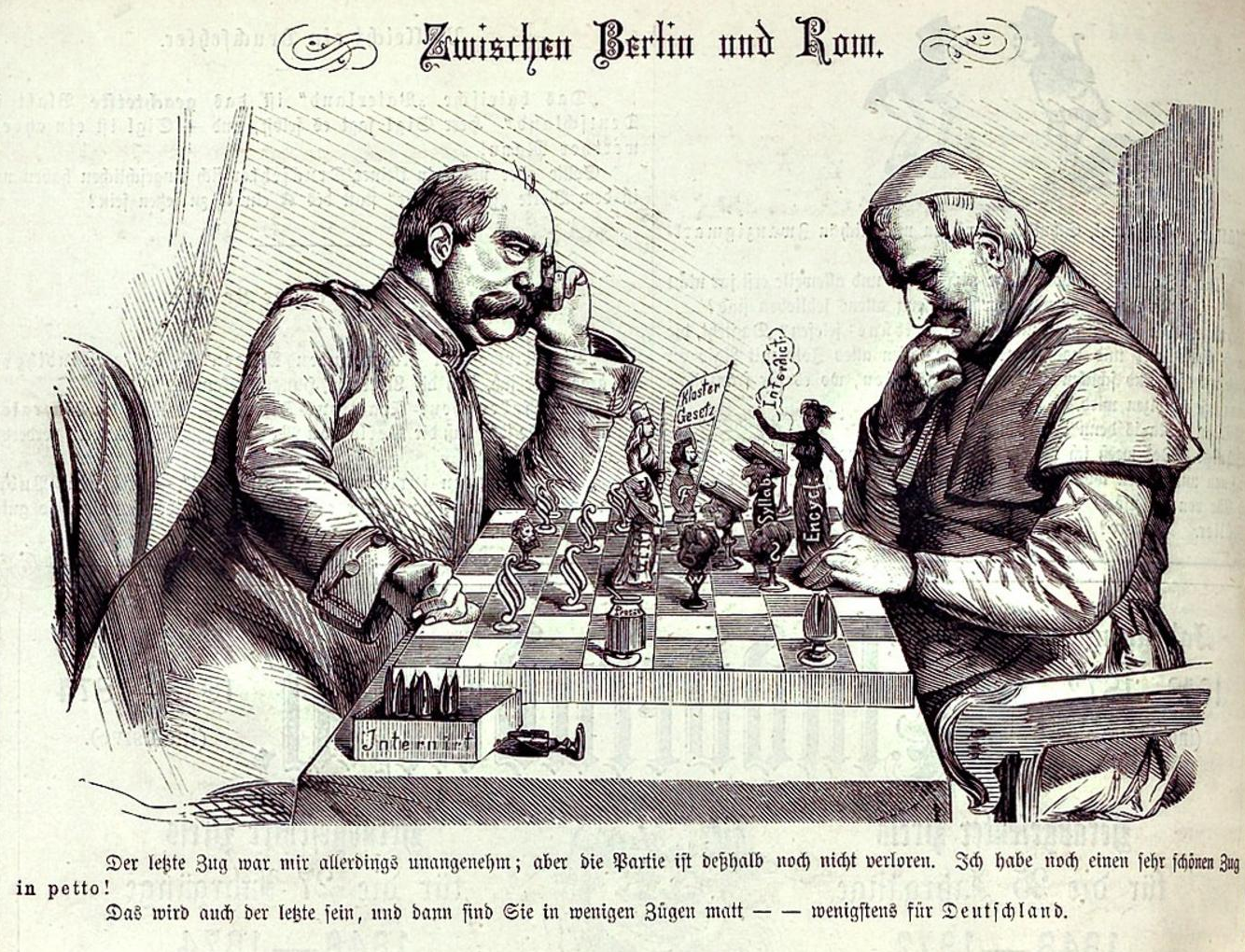
Between Berlin and Rome, Bismarck (left) confronts Pope Pius IX, 1875

After 1870 Chancellor Otto von Bismarck would not tolerate any base of power outside Germany—in Rome—having a say in German affairs. He launched a Kulturkampf ("culture war") against the power of the pope and the Catholic Church in 1873, but only in Prussia. This gained strong support from German liberals, who saw the Catholic Church as the bastion of reaction and their greatest enemy. The Catholic element, in turn, saw in the National-Liberals as its worst enemy and formed the Center Party.

Catholics, although nearly a third of the national population, were seldom allowed to hold major positions in the Imperial government, or the Prussian government. Most of the Kulturkampf was fought out in Prussia, but Imperial Germany passed the Pulpit Law which made it a crime for any cleric to discuss public issues in a way that displeased the government. Nearly all Catholic bishops, clergy, and laymen rejected the legality of the new laws, and were defiant facing the increasingly heavy penalties and imprisonments imposed by Bismarck's government. Historian Anthony Steinhoff reports the casualty totals:

As of 1878, only three of eight Prussian dioceses still had bishops, some 1,125 of 4,600 parishes were vacant, and nearly 1,800 priests ended up in jail or in exile....Finally, between 1872 and 1878, numerous Catholic newspapers were confiscated, Catholic associations and assemblies were dissolved, and Catholic civil servants were dismissed merely on the pretence of having Ultramontane sympathies.

Bismarck underestimated the resolve of the Catholic Church and did not foresee the extremes that this struggle would entail. The Catholic Church denounced the harsh new laws as anti-catholic and mustered the support of its rank and file voters across Germany. In the following elections, the Center Party won a quarter of the seats in the Imperial Diet. The conflict ended after 1879 because Pius IX died in 1878 and Bismarck broke with the Liberals to put his main emphasis on tariffs, foreign policy, and attacking socialists. Bismarck negotiated with the conciliatory new pope Leo XIII. Peace was restored, the bishops returned and the jailed clerics were released. Laws were toned down or taken back (Mitigation Laws 1880–1883 and Peace Laws 1886–87), but the main regulations such as the Pulpit Law and the laws concerning education, civil registry (incl. marriage) or religious disaffiliation remained in place. The Center Party gained strength and became an ally of Bismarck, especially when he attacked socialism.

=== First Vatican Council ===
On 7 February 1862, Pope Pius IX issued the papal constitution Ad Universalis Ecclesiae, dealing with the conditions for admission to Catholic religious orders of men in which solemn vows were prescribed.

The doctrine of papal primacy was further developed in 1870 at the First Vatican Council, which declared that "in the disposition of God the Roman church holds the preeminence of ordinary power over all the other churches". This council also affirmed the dogma of papal infallibility, (declaring that the infallibility of the Christian community extends to the pope himself, when he defines a doctrine concerning faith or morals to be held by the whole Church), and of papal supremacy (supreme, full, immediate, and universal ordinary jurisdiction of the pope).

The most substantial body of defined doctrine on the subject is found in Pastor aeternus, the Dogmatic Constitution on the Church of Christ of Vatican Council I. This document declares that "in the disposition of God the Roman church holds the preeminence of ordinary power over all the other churches." This council also affirmed the dogma of papal infallibility.

The council defined a twofold primacy of Peter, one in papal teaching on faith and morals (the charism of infallibility), and the other a primacy of jurisdiction involving government and discipline of the Church, submission to both being necessary to Catholic faith and salvation. It rejected the ideas that papal decrees have "no force or value unless confirmed by an order of the secular power" and that the pope's decisions can be appealed to an ecumenical council "as to an authority higher than the Roman Pontiff."

Paul Collins argues that "(the doctrine of papal primacy as formulated by the First Vatican Council) has led to the exercise of untrammelled papal power and has become a major stumbling block in ecumenical relationships with the Orthodox (who consider the definition to be heresy) and Protestants."

Before the council in 1854, Pius IX, with the support of the overwhelming majority of bishops, proclaimed the dogma of the Immaculate Conception.

=== Social teachings ===
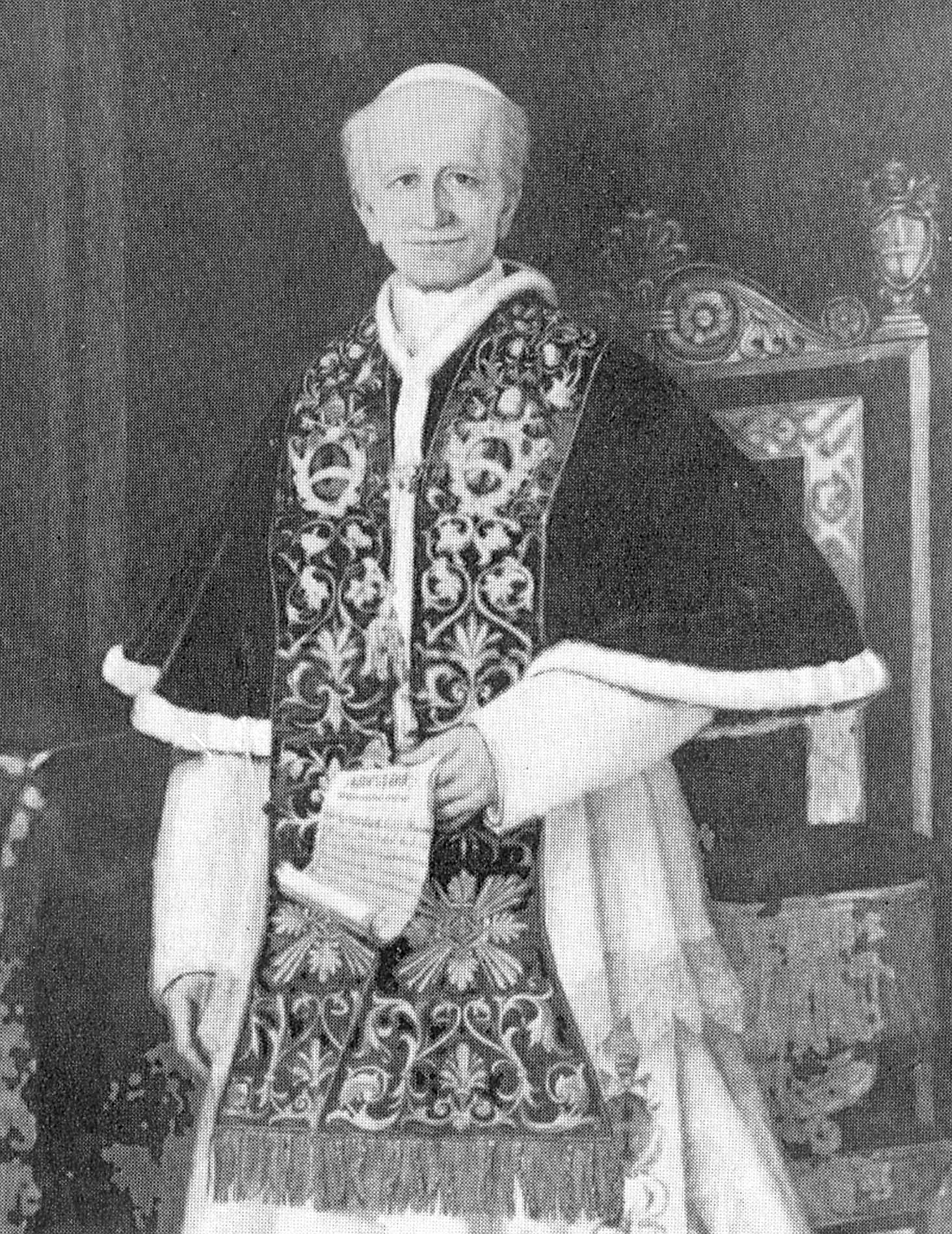
The Church was slow to react to the growing industrialization and impoverishment of workers, trying first to immediate the situation with increased charity Franzen 350 In 1891 Pope Leo XIII issued Rerum novarum in which the Church defined the dignity and rights of industrial workers.

The Industrial Revolution brought many concerns about the deteriorating working and living conditions of urban workers. Influenced by the German Bishop Wilhelm Emmanuel Freiherr von Ketteler, in 1891, Pope Leo XIII published the encyclical Rerum novarum, which set in context Catholic social teaching in terms that rejected socialism but advocated the regulation of working conditions. Rerum novarum argued for the establishment of a living wage and the right of workers to form trade unions.

=== Veneration of Mary ===
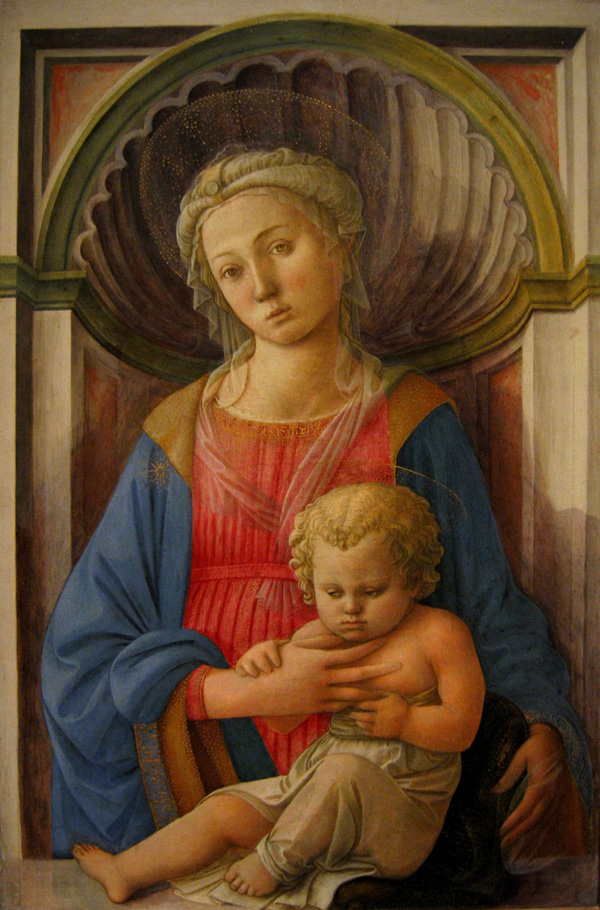
Madonna and Child, by Filippo Lippi

Popes have always highlighted the inner link between the Virgin Mary as Mother of God and the full acceptance of Jesus Christ as Son of God. Since the 19th century, they were highly important for the development of mariology to explain the veneration of Mary through their decisions not only in the area of Marian beliefs (Mariology) but also Marian practices and devotions. Before the 19th century, popes promulgated Marian veneration by authorizing new Marian feast days, prayers, initiatives, and the acceptance and support of Marian congregations. Since the 19th century, popes began to use encyclicals more frequently. Thus Leo XIII, the Rosary Pope, issued eleven Marian encyclicals. Recent popes promulgated the veneration of the Blessed Virgin with two dogmas: Pius IX with the Immaculate Conception in 1854, and the Assumption of Mary in 1950 by Pope Pius XII. Pius IX, Pius XI, and Pius XII facilitated the veneration of Marian apparitions such as in Lourdes and Fátima.

=== Anti-clericalism, secularism and socialism ===
In many revolutionary movements the church was denounced for its links with the established regimes. Liberals in particular targeted the Catholic Church as the great enemy. Thus, for example, after the French Revolution and the Mexican Revolution there was a distinct anti-clerical tone in those countries that exists to this day. Socialism in particular was in many cases openly hostile to religion; Karl Marx condemned all religion as the "opium of the people," as he considered it a false sense of hope in an afterlife withholding the people from facing their worldly situation.

In the History of Latin America, a succession of anti-clerical liberal regimes came to power beginning in the 1830s. The confiscation of Church properties and restrictions on priests and bishops generally accompanied secularist, reforms.

=== Jesuits ===
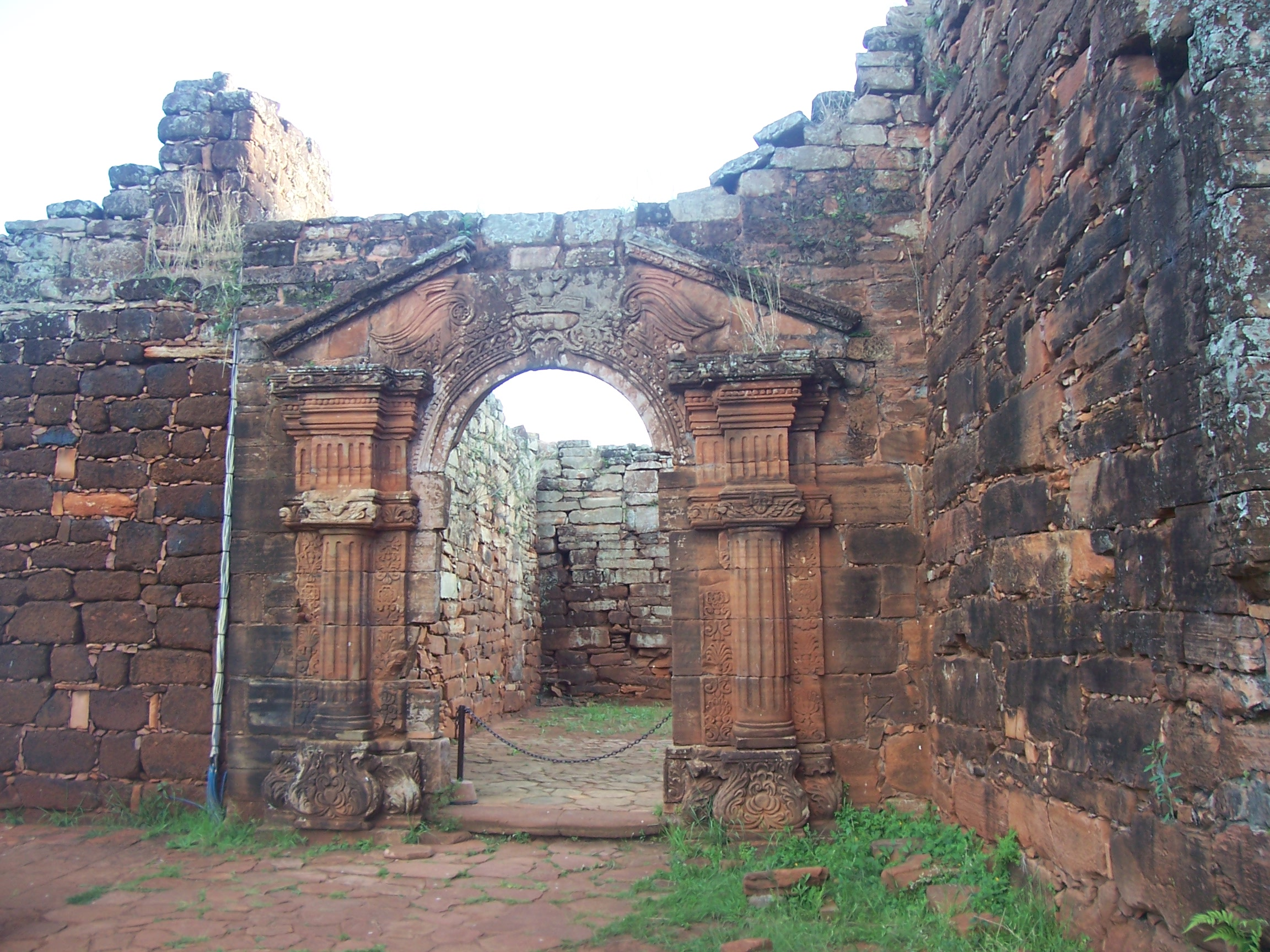
Church from the Indian settlement of San Ignacio Miní

Only in the 19th century, after the breakdown of most Spanish and Portuguese colonies, was the Vatican able to take charge of Catholic missionary activities through its Propaganda Fide organization.

During this period, the Church faced colonial abuses from the Portuguese and Spanish governments. In South America, the Jesuits protected native peoples from enslavement by establishing semi-independent settlements called reductions. Pope Gregory XVI, challenging Spanish and Portuguese sovereignty, appointed his own candidates as bishops in the colonies, condemned slavery and the slave trade in 1839 (papal bull In supremo apostolatus), and approved the ordination of native clergy in spite of government racism.

=== Africa ===
By the close of the 19th century, new technologies and superior weaponry had allowed European powers to gain control of most of the African interior. The new rulers introduced a cash economy which required African people to become literate and so created a great demand for schools. At the time, the only possibility open to Africans for a western education was through Christian missionaries. Catholic missionaries followed colonial governments into Africa and built schools, monasteries, and churches.

=== Australasia and Oceania ===
The influx of Irish into Australia, first convicts and then poor free settlers, led to about a quarter of the Australian white population being Catholic. Irish priests, brothers and nuns led a strong church based on Irish models of piety. The Australian Catholic Church ended the century in a phase of rapid expansion led by Cardinal Moran.

In New Zealand and many of the Pacific Islands, the French Marist Fathers established many successful missions.

== Eastern Orthodox Church ==
=== Greece ===
Even several decades before the fall of Constantinople to the Ottoman Empire in 1453, most of Greece had come under Ottoman rule. During this time, there were several revolt attempts by Greeks to gain independence from Ottoman control. In 1821, The Greek revolution was officially declared and by the end of the month, the Peloponnese was in open revolt against the Turks. The Ecumenical Patriarchate of Constantinople had issued statements condemning and even anathematizing the revolutionaries so as to protect the Greeks of Constantinople from reprisals by the Ottoman Turks.

These statements, however, failed to convince anyone, least of all the Turkish government, which on Easter Day in 1821 had the Patriarch Gregory V hanged from the main gate of the patriarchal residence as a public example by order of the Sultan; this was followed by a massacre of the Greek population of Constantinople. The brutal execution of Gregory V, especially on the day of Easter Sunday, shocked and infuriated the Greeks. It also caused protests in the rest of Europe and reinforced the movement of Philhellenism. There are references that during the Greek War of Independence, many revolutionaries engraved on their swords the name of Gregory, seeking revenge.

With the establishment of the Kingdom of Greece, the government decided to take control of the church, breaking away from the patriarch in Constantinople. The government declared the church to be autocephalous in 1833 in a political decision of the Bavarian Regents acting for King Otto, who was a minor. The decision roiled Greek politics for decades as royal authorities took increasing control. The new status was finally recognized as such by the Patriarchate in 1850, under compromise conditions with the issue of a special "Tomos" decree which brought it back to a normal status.

By the 1880s the "Anaplasis" ("Regeneration") Movement led to renewed spiritual energy and enlightenment. It fought against the rationalistic and materialistic ideas that had seeped in from secular Western Europe. It promoted catechism schools and Bible study circles.

=== Serbia ===
The Serbian Orthodox Church in the Principality of Serbia gained its autonomy in 1831, and was organized as the Metropolitanate of Belgrade, remaining under the supreme ecclesiastical jurisdiction of the Ecumenical Patriarchate of Constantinople. Principality of Serbia gained full political independence from the Ottoman Empire in 1878, and soon after that negotiations were initiated with the Ecumenical Patriarchate, resulting in canonical recognition of full ecclesiastical independence (autocephaly) for the Metropolitanate of Belgrade in 1879. In the same time, Serbian Orthodox eparchies in Bosnia and Herzegovina remained under supreme ecclesiastical jurisdiction of the Ecumenical Patriarchate, but gained internal autonomy. In southern eparchies, that remained under the Ottoman rule, Serbian metropolitans were appointed by the end of the 19th century.

=== Romania ===
The Orthodox hierarchy in the territory of modern Romania had existed within the ecclesiastical jurisdiction of the Ecumenical Patriarchate of Constantinople until 1865 when the Churches in the Romanian principalities of Moldavia and Wallachia embarked on the path of ecclesiastical independence by nominating Nifon Rusailă, Metropolitan of Ungro-Wallachia, as the first Romanian primate. Prince Alexandru Ioan Cuza, who had in 1863 carried out a mass confiscation of monastic estates in the face of stiff opposition from the Greek hierarchy in Constantinople, in 1865 pushed through a legislation that proclaimed complete independence of the Church in the Principalities from the Patriarchate.

In 1872, the Orthodox churches in the principalities, the Metropolis of Ungro-Wallachia and the Metropolis of Moldavia, merged to form the Romanian Orthodox Church.

Following the international recognition of the independence of the United Principalities of Moldavia and Wallachia (later Kingdom of Romania) in 1878, after a long period of negotiations with the Ecumenical Patriarchate, Patriarch Joachim IV granted recognition to the autocephalous Metropolis of Romania in 1885.

=== Russia ===
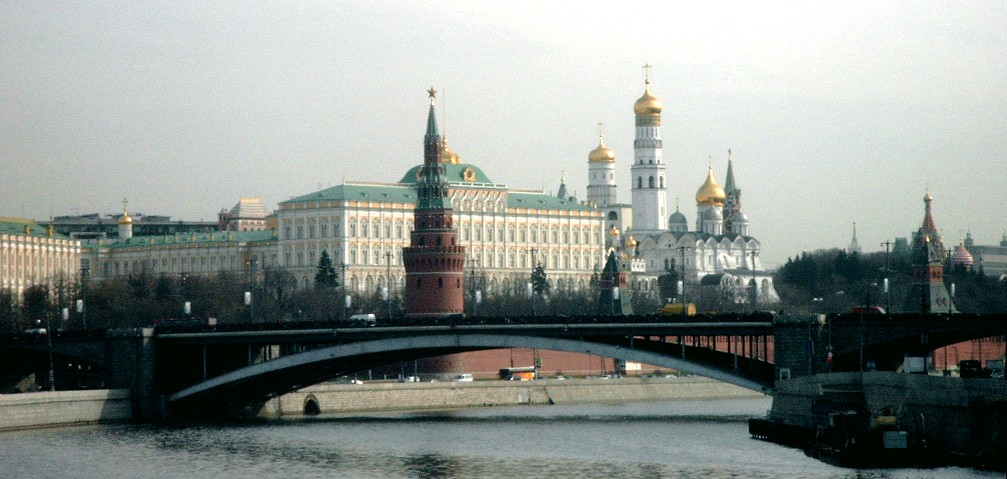
Churches of the Moscow Kremlin, as seen from the Balchug

The Russian Orthodox Church held a privileged position in the Russian Empire, expressed in the motto Orthodoxy, Autocracy, and Populism, of the late Russian Empire. At the same time, it was placed under the control of the tsar by the Church reform of Peter I in the 18th century. Its governing body was the Most Holy Synod, which was run by an official (titled Ober-Procurator) appointed by the tsar.

The church was involved in the various campaigns of russification, and accused of involvement in anti-Jewish pogroms. In the case of anti-Semitism and the anti-Jewish pogroms, no evidence is given of the direct participation of the church, and many Russian Orthodox clerics, including senior hierarchs, openly defended persecuted Jews, at least from the second half of the 19th century. Also, the Church has no official position on Judaism as such.

The church, like the tsarist state, was seen as an enemy of the people by the Bolsheviks and other Russian revolutionaries.

=== Georgia ===
In 1801, the Kingdom of Kartl-Kakheti (Eastern Georgia) was occupied and annexed by the Russian Empire. On 18 July 1811, the autocephalous status of the Georgian Church was abolished by the Russian authorities, despite strong opposition in Georgia, and the Georgian Church was subjected to the synodical rule of the Russian Orthodox Church. From 1817, the metropolitan bishop, or exarch, in charge of the Church was an ethnic Russian, with no knowledge of the Georgian language and culture. The Georgian liturgy was suppressed and replaced with Church Slavonic, ancient frescoes were whitewashed from the walls of many churches, and publication of religious literature in Georgian heavily censored.

=== Cyprus ===
In 1821 with the outbreak of the Greek War of Independence, the Greeks of Cyprus attempted to follow in the footsteps of those of Greece, such was the accusation which Küçük Mehmed brought against the bishops and the leading Greek laymen of the Island. As a result of this Archbishop Kyprianos, the three bishops of Paphos, Kition and Kyrenia together with other leading ecclesiastics and citizens were arrested. The Archbishop and his archdeacon were summarily hanged, the three bishops beheaded and the notables dispatched by the Janissaries. The Cypriot Orthodox Church had paid a terrible penalty for its abuse of power. This was the worst experience between Orthodox Church of Cyprus and Ottoman administration, and beginning of political separation.

The purchase of Cyprus by the British in 1878 allowed more freedom in religious practices, such as the use of bells in churches (which were forbidden under the Ottomans). Some linopampakoi took advantage of the political change to convert back to Christianity.

== Coptic Orthodox Church ==
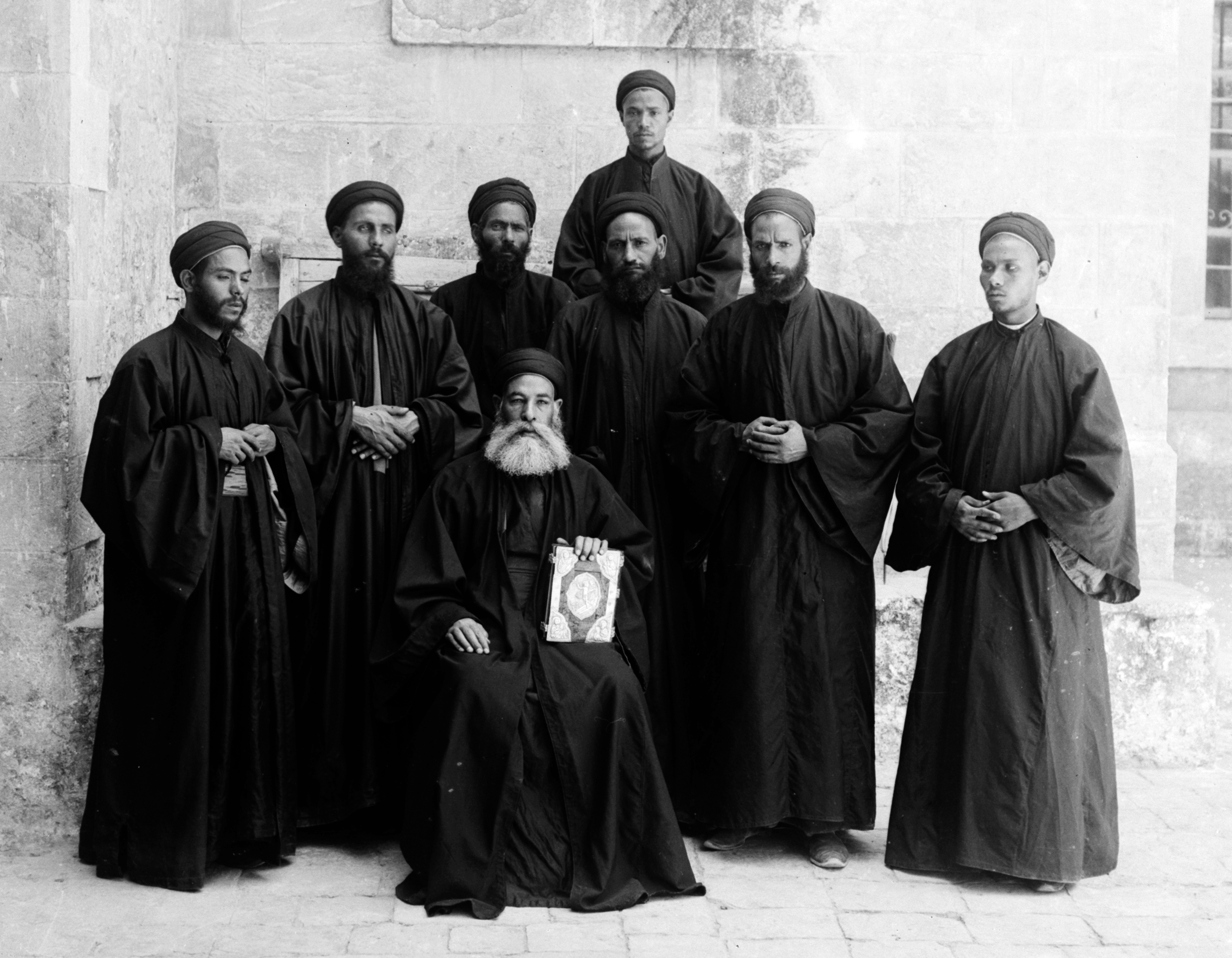
Coptic monks, between 1898 and 1914

The position of Copts began to improve early in the 19th century under the stability and tolerance of the Muhammad Ali Dynasty. The Coptic community ceased to be regarded by the state as an administrative unit. In 1855 the jizya tax was abolished by Sa'id Pasha. Shortly thereafter, the Copts started to serve in the Egyptian army.

Towards the end of the 19th century, the Coptic Church underwent phases of new development. In 1853, Coptic Pope Cyril IV established the first modern Coptic schools, including the first Egyptian school for girls. He also founded a printing press, which was only the second national press in the country. Coptic Pope established very friendly relations with other denominations, to the extent that when the Greek Orthodox Patriarch of Alexandria had to absent himself from the country for a long period of time, he left his Church under the guidance of the Coptic Patriarch.

The Theological College of the School of Alexandria was reestablished in 1893. It began its new history with five students, one of whom was later to become its dean.

== Timeline ==
19th century timeline
- 1801 Cane Ridge, Kentucky
- 1801 – John Theodosius Van Der Kemp moves to Graaff Reinet to minister to the Khoikhoi (Hottentots) people. Earlier he had helped found the Netherlands Missionary Society. In 1798, he had gone to South Africa to work as a missionary among the Xhosa.
- 1802 – Henry Martyn hears Charles Simeon speak of William Carey's work in India and resolves to become a missionary himself. He will sail for India in 1805
- 1803 – The Massachusetts Baptist Missionary Society votes to publish a missionary magazine. Now known as The American Baptist, the periodical is the oldest religious magazine in the U.S.
- 1804 – British and Foreign Bible Society formed; Church Missionary Society enters Sierra Leone
- 1805 – The first Christian missionaries arrive in Namibia, brothers Abraham and Christian Albrecht from the London Missionary Society
- 1806 – Haystack prayer meeting at Williams College; Andover Theological Seminary founded as a missionary training center; Protestant missionary work begins in earnest across southern Africa
- 1807 – First Protestant missionary to China, Robert Morrison, begins work in Guangzhou (formerly called Canton)
- 1809 – London Society for Promoting Christianity Amongst the Jews (now known as the Church's Ministry Among Jewish People) founded
- 1809 – National Bible Society of Scotland organized
- 1810 – The American Board of Commissioners for Foreign Missions is formed
- 1811 – English Wesleyans enter Sierra Leone
- 1811 The Campbells begin Restoration Movement
- 1812 – First American foreign missionary, Adoniram Judson, arrives in Serampore and soon goes to Burma
- 1813 – The Methodists form the Wesleyan Missionary Society.
- 1814 – First recorded baptism of a mainland Chinese Protestant convert, Cai Gao; American Baptist Foreign Mission Society formed; Netherlands Bible Society founded; first missionaries arrive in New Zealand led by Samuel Marsden
- 1815 – American Board of Commissioners for Foreign Missions open work on Ceylon, modern-day Sri Lanka through American Ceylon Mission; Basel Missionary Society organized; Richmond African Missionary Society founded
- 1815 Peter the Aleut, orthodox Christian tortured and martyred in Catholic San Francisco, California
- 1816 – Robert Moffat arrives in Africa; American Bible Society founded
- 1816 Bishop Richard Allen, a former slave, founds the African Methodist Episcopal Church, the first African-American denomination
- 1817 – James Thompson, agent for British and Foreign Bible Society, begins distributing Bibles throughout Latin America
- 1817 Claus Harms publishes 95 theses against rationalism and Prussian Union
- 1818 – Missionary work begins in Madagascar with the reluctant approval of the king
- 1819 – John Scudder, missionary physician, joins the American Ceylon Mission; Wesleyan Methodists start work in Madras, India; Reginald Heber writes words to missionary classic "From Greenland's Icy Mountains"
- 1819 Thomas Jefferson produced the Jefferson Bible
- 1820 – Hiram Bingham goes to Hawaii (Sandwich Islands)
- 1821 – African-American Lott Carey, a Baptist missionary, sails with 28 colleagues from Norfolk, VA to Sierra Leone; Protestant Episcopal Church mission board established
- 1822 – African American Betsy Stockton is sent by the American Board of Missions to Hawaii. She thus becomes the first single woman missionary in the history of modern missions.
- 1823 – Scottish Missionary Society workers arrive in Bombay, India; Liang Fa, first Chinese Protestant evangelist, is ordained by Robert Morrison; Colonial and Continental Church Society formed
- 1824 – Berlin Mission Society formed
- 1824 English translation of Wilhelm Gesenius' ...Handwörterbuch...: Hebrew-English Lexicon, Hendrickson Publishers
- 1825 – George Boardman goes to Burma
- 1826 – American Bible Society sends first shipment of Bibles to Mexico
- 1827 – Missionary Lancelot Edward Threlkeld reports in The Monitor that he was "advancing rapidly" in his efforts to disseminate Holy Scripture among Indigenous Australians of the Hunter and Shoalhaven Rivers.
- 1827 Ernst Wilhelm Hengstenberg takes on the editorship of the Evangelische Kirchenzeitung, the chief literary organ of the Neo-Lutheranism
- 1827 Samuel Gobat begins his first stay in Ethiopia, residing at the capital city of Gondar. He is one of the first modern missionaries to that country.
- 1828 – Basel Mission begins work in the Christiansborg area of Accra, Ghana; Karl Gützlaff of the Netherlands Missionary Society lands in Bangkok, Thailand; Rhenish Missionary Association formed
- 1828 Plymouth Brethren founded, Dispensationalism
- 1829 – George Müller, a native of Prussia, goes to England as a missionary to the Jews; Anthony Norris Groves, an Exeter dentist, sets off as a missionary to Baghdad accompanied by John Kitto
- 1830 – Church of Scotland missionary Alexander Duff arrives in Kolkata (formerly Calcutta); William Swan, missionary to Siberia, writes Letters on Missions, the first Protestant comprehensive treatment of the theory and practice of missions; Baptism of Taufa'ahau Tupou, King of Tonga, by a western missionary
- 1830 Catherine Laboure receives Miraculous Medal from the Blessed Mother in Paris, France.
- 1830 Charles Finney's revivals lead to Second Great Awakening in America
- 1830, 6 April Church of Jesus Christ of Latter Day Saints (Mormonism) founded by Joseph Smith, Jr. as a result of reported visitations and commandment by God the Father, Jesus Christ, and later the Angel Moroni. Book of Mormon also published in 1830.
- 1831 – American Congregational missionaries arrive in Thailand, withdrawing in 1849 without a single convert; four Native Americans from beyond the Rocky Mountains come east to St. Louis, Missouri seeking information on the "palefaces' religion"
- 1832 – Teava, former cannibal and pioneer Pacific Islander missionary, is commissioned by John Williams to work on the Samoan island of Manono
- 1832 Church of Christ (Disciples) organized, made up of Presbyterians in distress over Protestant factionalism and decline of fervor
- 1832 persecution of Old Lutherans: by a royal decree of 28 February all Lutheran worship is declared illegal in Prussia in favour of Prussian Union.
- 1833 – Baptist work in Thailand begins with John Taylor Jones; the first American Methodist missionary, Melville Cox, goes to Liberia where he dies within four months. His dying appeal was: "Let a thousand fall before Africa be given up"; Free Will Baptist Foreign Missionary Society begins work in India
- 1833 John Keble's sermon "National Apostasy" initiates the Oxford Movement in England
- 1834 – American Presbyterian Mission opens work in India in the Punjab; Peter Parker MD, associated with the American Board of Commissioners for Foreign Missions, first American Medical Missionary to China opens Ophthalmic Hospital at Canton
- 1835 – Rhenish Missionary Society begins work among the Dayaks on Borneo (Indonesia); Daniel Wilson, Bishop of Calcutta calls India's caste system "a cancer."
- 1836 – Plymouth Brethren begin work in Madras, India; George Müller begins his work with orphans in Bristol, England;Gossner Mission formed; Leipzig Mission Society established; Colonial Missionary Society formed; The Providence Missionary Baptist District Association is formed, one of at least six national organizations among African American Baptists whose sole objective was missionary work in Africa.
- 1837 – Evangelical Lutheran Church mission board established; First translation of Bible into Japanese (actual translation work done in Singapore)
- 1838 – Church of Scotland Mission of Inquiry to the Jews; four Scottish ministers including Robert Murray M'Cheyne and Andrew Bonar journey to Palestine; Augustinians enter Australia.
- 1838–1839 Saxon Lutherans objecting to theological rationalism emigrate from Germany to the United States; settle in Perry County, Missouri. Leads to formation of the LCMS
- 1839 – Entire Bible is published in language of Tahiti; three French missionaries martyred in Korea; English Protestant missionaries, including John Williams, murdered on Erromango (Vanuatu, South Pacific)
- 1840 – David Livingstone is in present-day Malawi (Africa) with the London Missionary Society; American Presbyterians enter Thailand and labor for 18 years before seeing their first Thai convert; Irish Presbyterian Missionary Society formed; Welsh Calvinistic Methodist Missionary Society founded
- 1841 – Edinburgh Medical Missionary Society formed; Welsh Methodists begin working among the Khasi people of India
- 1842 – Church Missionary Society enters Badagry, Lagos
- 1842 – Gossner Mission Society receives royal sanction; Norwegian Missionary Society formed in Stavanger
- 1842 – Methodist Missionary, Thomas Birch Freeman arrives in Badagry, Nigeria ;
- 1843 – Baptist John Taylor Jones translates New Testament into the Thai language; British Society for the Propagation of the Gospel among the Jews formed
- 1843, Disruption of: schism within the established Church of Scotland
- 1844 – German Ludwig Krapf begins work in Mombasa on the Kenya Coast; first Young Men's Christian Association (YMCA) formed by George Williams; George Smith and Thomas McClatchie sail for China as the first two CMS missionaries to that country
- 1844 Lars Levi Laestadius experiences awakening: beginning of laestadianism
- 1844, 22 October Great Disappointment, false prediction of Second Coming of Christ by Millerites
- 1845 – Southern Baptist Convention mission organization founded
- 1845 Southern Baptist Convention formed in Augusta, Georgia
- 1846 – The London Missionary Society establishes work on Niue, a South Pacific island which westerners had named the "savage island"
- 1846 Bernadette Soubirous received the first of 18 apparitions of Our Lady of Lourdes in Lourdes, France.
- 1847 – Presbyterian William Burns goes to China, translates The Pilgrim's Progress into Chinese; Moses White sails to China as a Methodist medical missionary
- 1848 – Charles Forman goes to Punjab; German missionaries Johannes Rebmann and Johann Ludwig Krapf arrive at Kilimanjaro. Initially, their story of a snow-covered peak near the equator was scoffed at.
- 1848 Epistle to the Easterners and Encyclical of the Eastern Patriarchs response
- 1848 Oneida Community founded by John Humphrey Noyes in western New York state
- 1849 – Just weeks after arriving on the Melanesian island of Anatom, missionary John Geddie wrote in his journal: "In the darkness, degradation, pollution and misery that surrounds me, I will look forward in the vision of faith to the time when some of these poor islanders will unite in the triumphant song of ransomed souls, 'Unto Him that loved us, and washed us from our sins in His own blood.'"
- 1850 – On the occasion of Karl Gützlaff's visit to Europe, the Berlin Ladies Association for China is established in conjunction with the Berlin Missionary Association for China. Work in China will commence in 1851 with the arrival of Hermandine Neumann in Hong Kong. Rev. Thomas Valpy French, came to India in 1850, founded St. John's College, Agra, and became first Bishop of Lahore in 1877.
- 1851 – Allen Gardiner and six missionary colleagues die of exposure and starvation at Patagonia on the southern tip of South America because a re-supply ship from England arrives six months late.
- 1852 – Zenana (women) and Medical Missionary Fellowship formed in England to send out single women missionaries
- 1853– The Hermannsburg Missionary Society, founded in 1849 by Louis Harms, has finished training its first group of young missionaries. They are sent to Africa on a ship (the Kandaze) which had been built entirely from donations.
- 1854 – New York Missionary Conference, guided by Alexander Duff, ponders the question: "To what extent are we authorized by the Word of God to expect the conversion of the world to Christ?"; Henry Venn, secretary of the Church Missionary Society, sets out ideal of self-governing, self-supporting and self-propagating churches; Hudson Taylor arrives in China
- 1854 Immaculate Conception, defined as Catholic dogma
- 1854 Missionary Hudson Taylor arrives in China
- 1855 – Henry Steinhauer is ordained as a Canadian Methodist missionary to North American Indians and posted to Lac La Biche, Alberta. Steinhauer's missionary work had actually begun 15 years earlier in 1840 when he was assigned to Lac La Pluie to assist in translating, teaching and interpreting the Ojibwa and Cree languages.
- 1855 Søren Kierkegaard, founder of Christian existentialism
- 1856 – Presbyterians start work in Colombia with the arrival of Henry Pratt
- 1857 – Bible translated into Tswana language; Board of Foreign Missions of Dutch Reformed Church set up; four missionary couples killed at the Fatehgarh mission during the Indian Mutiny of 1857; Publication of David Livingstone's book Missionary Travels and Researches in South Africa
- 1858 – John G. Paton begins work in New Hebrides; Basel Evangelical Missionary Society begins work in western Sumatra (Indonesia)
- 1859 – Protestant missionaries arrive in Japan; Revivals in North America and the British Isles generate interest in overseas missions; Albert Benjamin Simpson (founder of Christian and Missionary Alliance) is converted by the revival ministry of Henry Grattan Guinness
- 1861 – Protestant Stundism arises in the village of Osnova of modern-day Ukraine; Sarah Doremus founds the Women's Union Missionary Society; Episcopal Church opens work in Haiti; Rhenish Mission goes to Indonesia under Ludwig Nommensen
- 1862 – Paris Evangelical Missionary Society opens work in Senegal
- 1863 – Robert Moffat, missionary to Africa with the London Missionary Society, publishes his book Rivers of Water in a Dry Place, Being an Account of the Introduction of Christianity into South Africa, and of Mr. Moffat's Missionary Labours
- 1863 Seventh-day Adventist Church officially formed twenty 20 years after the Great Disappointment
- 1865 – The China Inland Mission is founded by James Hudson Taylor; James Laidlaw Maxwell plants first viable church in Taiwan. Salvation Army founded in London by William Booth
- 1865 Methodist preacher William Booth founds the Salvation Army, vowing to bring the gospel into the streets to the most desperate and needy
- 1866 – Charles Haddon Spurgeon invents The Wordless Book, which is widely used in cross-cultural evangelism; Theodore Jonas Meyer (1819–1894), a converted Jew serving as a Presbyterian missionary in Italy, nurses those dying in a cholera epidemic until he himself falls prey to the disease. Barely surviving, he becomes a peacemaker between Catholics and Protestants; Robert Thomas, the first Protestant martyr in Korea, is beheaded giving a Bible to his executioner.
- 1867 – Methodists start work in Argentina; Scripture Union established; Lars Olsen Skrefsrud and Hans Peter Børresen begin working among the Santals of India.
- 1868 – Robert Bruce goes to Iran, Canadian Baptist missionary Americus Timpany begins work among the Telugu people in India.
- 1869 – The first Methodist women's missionary magazine, The Heathen Women's Friend, begins publication.; Riot in Yangzhou, China destroys China Inland Mission house and nearly leads to open war between Britain and China.
- 1869–1870 Catholic First Vatican Council, asserted doctrine of Papal Infallibility, rejected by Christian Catholic Church of Switzerland
- 1870 – Clara Swain, the very first female missionary medical doctor, arrives at Bareilly, India; Orthodox Missionary Society founded
- 1870 Italy declared war on the Papal States. The Italian Army enters Rome. Papal States ceased to exist.
- 1871 – Henry Stanley finds David Livingstone in central Africa
- 1871 Pontmain, France was saved from advancing German troops with the appearing of Our Lady of Hope
- 1871–1878 German Kulturkampf against Roman Catholicism
- 1872 – First All-India Missionary Conference with 136 participants; George Leslie Mackay plants church in northern Taiwan; Lottie Moon appointed as missionary to China
- 1873 – Regions Beyond Missionary Union founded in London in connection with the East London Training Institute for Home and Foreign Missions; first Scripture portion (Gospel of Luke) translated into Pangasinan, a language of the Philippines, by Alfonso Lallave
- 1874 – Lord Radstock's first visit to St. Petersburg, Russia, and the beginning of an evangelical awakening among the St. Petersburg nobility; Albert Sturges initiates the Interior Micronesia Mission in the Mortlock Islands under the leadership of Micronesian students from Ohwa
- 1875 – The Foreign Christian Missionary Society organized within the Christian Church (Disciples of Christ) and Church of Christ movements; Clah, a Canadian Indian convert, brought Christianity to natives at Ft. Wangel, Alaska. He assumed the name of Philip McKay.
- 1876 – In September, a rusty ocean steamer arrives at a port on the Calabar River in what is now Nigeria. That part of Africa was then known as the White Man's Grave. The only woman on board that ship is 29-year-old Mary Slessor, a missionary.
- 1877 – James Chalmers goes to New Guinea; Presbyterians Sheldon Jackson and missionary-widow Amanda McFarland arrive at Ft. Wrangel, Alaska where they join Philip McKay (née Clah) to start missionary work. McFarland was the first white woman in Alaska, and renowned as "Alaska's Courageous Missionary." China Inland Mission opens up settled mission work in Sichuan.
- 1878 – Mass movement to Christ begins in Ongole, India
- 1879 Church of Christ, Scientist founded in Boston by Mary Baker Eddy
- 1879 Knock, County Mayo, Ireland was location of the apparition of Our Lady, Queen of Ireland.
- 1880 – Woman missionary doctor Fanny Butler goes to India; Missionary periodical The Gospel in All Lands is launched by A. B. Simpson; Justus Henry Nelson and Fannie Bishop Capen Nelson begin 45 years of service in Belém, Pará, Brazil, establishing the first Protestant Church in Amazonia in 1883
- 1881 – Methodist work in Lahore, Pakistan starts in the wake of revivals under Bishop William Taylor; North Africa Mission (now Arab World Ministries) founded on work of Edward Glenny in Algeria
- 1881–1894 Revised Version, called for by Church of England, used Greek based on Septuagint (B) and (S), Hebrew Masoretic Text used in OT, follows Greek order of words, greater accuracy than AV, includes Apocrypha, scholarship never disputed
- 1882 – James Gilmour, London Missionary Society missionary to Mongolia, goes home to England for a furlough. During that time he published a book: Among the Mongols. It was so well-written that one critic wrote, "Robinson Crusoe has turned missionary, lived years in Mongolia, and wrote a book about it." Concerning the author, the critic said, "If ever on earth there lived a man who kept the law of Christ, and could give proof of it, and be absolutely unconscious that he was giving it to them, it is this man whom the Mongols called 'our Gilmour.'" American Methodist Episcopal Mission enters Sichuan.
- 1883 – Salvation Army enters West Pakistan; A.B. Simpson organizes The Missionary Union for the Evangelization of the World. The first classes of the Missionary Training College are held in New York City. Zaire Christian and Missionary Alliance mission field opens.
- 1884 – David Torrance is sent by the Jewish Mission of the Free Church of Scotland as a medical missionary to Palestine
- 1884 Charles Taze Russell founded Bible Student movement known today as Jehovah's Witnesses
- 1885 – Horace Grant Underwood, Presbyterian missionary, and Henry Appenzeller, Methodist missionary, arrive in Korea; Scottish Ion Keith-Falconer goes to Aden on the Arabian peninsula; "Cambridge Seven" – C. T. Studd, M. Beauchamp, W. W. Cassels, D. E. Hoste, S. P. Smith, A. T. Podhill-Turner, C. H. Polhill-Turner – go to China as missionaries with the China Inland Mission
- 1885 Baltimore Catechism
- 1886 – Student Volunteer Movement launched as 100 university and seminary students at Moody's conference grounds at Mount Hermon, Massachusetts, sign the Princeton Pledge which says: "I purpose, God willing, to become a foreign missionary."
- 1886 Moody Bible Institute
- 1887 -The Hundred missionaries deployed in one year in China under the China Inland Mission. Dr. William Cassidy, a Toronto medical doctor, was ordained as the Christian and Missionary Alliance's first missionary preacher. Unfortunately, en route to China, he died of smallpox. However, Cassidy's death has been called the "spark that ignited the Alliance missionary blaze." William Cassels, Montagu Proctor-Beauchamp, Arthur T. Polhill-Turner, and Cecil H. Polhill-Turner (four of the Cambridge Seven) arrive in Sichuan; Robert John Davidson and Mary Jane Davidson, Quaker missionaries of the Friends' Foreign Mission Association, arrive in Sichuan.
- 1888 – Jonathan Goforth sails to China; Student Volunteer Movement for foreign missions officially organized with John R. Mott as chairman and Robert Wilder as traveling secretary. The movement's motto, coined by Wilder, was: "The evangelization of the world in this generation.; Scripture Gift Mission (now Lifewords) founded
- 1889 – Missionary linguist and folklorist Paul Olaf Bodding arrives in India, Santhal Parganas, and continues the work among the Santals started by Skrefsrud and Børresen in 1867; North Africa Mission enters Tripoli as first Protestant mission in Libya
- 1890 – Central American Mission founded by C. I. Scofield, editor of the Scofield Reference Bible; Methodist Charles Gabriel writes missionary song "Send the Light"; John Livingston Nevius of China visits Korea to outline his strategy for missions: 1) Each believer should be a productive member of society and active in sharing his faith; 2) The church in Korea should be distinctly Korean and free of foreign control; 3) The leaders of the Korean church will be selected and trained from its members; 4) Church buildings will be built by Koreans with their own resources; American Baptist Missionary Union enters Sichuan.
- 1891 – Samuel Zwemer goes to Arabia; Helen Chapman sails for the Congo (Zaire). She married a Danish missionary, William Rasmussen, whom she met during the voyage; Church Missionary Society enters Sichuan.
- 1892 – Redcliffe College, Centre for Mission Training founded in Chelsea, London. Canadian Methodist Mission enters Sichuan.
- 1893 – Eleanor Chestnut goes to China as Presbyterian medical missionary; Sudan Interior Mission founded by Rowland Bingham, a graduate of Nyack College
- 1893 First Bible translation into Oromiffa is published.
- 1894 – Soatanana Revival begins among Lutheran and LMS churches in Madagascar, lasting 80 years
- 1894 The Kingdom of God is Within You, by Leo Tolstoy, start of Christian anarchism
- 1895 – Africa Inland Mission formed by Peter Cameron Scott; Japan Bible Society established; Roland Allen sent as missionary for the Society for the Propagation of the Gospel in Foreign Parts to its North China Mission. Amy Carmichael arrives in India.
- 1896 – Ödön Scholtz founds the first Hungarian Lutheran foreign mission periodical Külmisszió
- 1897 – Presbyterian Church (USA) begins work in Venezuela
- 1897 Christian flag, conceived in Brooklyn, New York
- 1898 – Theresa Huntington leaves her New England home for the Middle East. For seven years she will work as an American Board missionary in Elazığ (Kharput) in the Ottoman Empire. Her letters home will be published in a book titled Great Need over the Water; Archibald Reekie of the Canadian Baptist Ministries arrives in Oruro as the first Protestant missionary to Bolivia. The work of Canadian Baptists led to the guarantee of freedom of religion in Bolivia in 1905.
- 1899 – James Rodgers arrives in Philippines with the Presbyterian Mission; Central American Mission enters Guatemala
- 1899 Gideons International founded
- 1900 – American Friends open work in Cuba; Ecumenical Missionary Conference in Carnegie Hall, New York (162 mission boards represented); 189 missionaries and their children killed in Boxer Rebellion in China; South African Andrew Murray writes The Key to the Missionary Problem in which he challenges the church to hold weeks of prayer for the world

== See also ==
- History of Christianity
- History of Protestantism
- History of the Roman Catholic Church#Industrial age
- History of the Eastern Orthodox Church
- History of Christian theology#Modern Christian theology
- History of Oriental Orthodoxy
- Timeline of the English Reformation
- Timeline of Christianity#19th century
- Timeline of Christian missions#1800 to 1849
- Timeline of the Roman Catholic Church#19th century
- Chronological list of saints and blesseds in the 19th century
- Restoration Movement

History of Christianity: Modern Christianity
Preceded by: Christianity in the 18th century / 19th century / Followed by: Christianity in the 20th century
BC	C1	C2	C3	C4	C5	C6	C7	C8	C9	C10
C11	C12	C13	C14	C15	C16	C17	C18	C19	C20	C21
