= Hermannsburg (disambiguation) =

Hermannsburg is a former municipality in Lower Saxony, Germany.

Hermannsburg may also refer to:

- Hermannsburg, KwaZulu-Natal, South Africa
- Hermannsburg, Northern Territory, Australia

== See also ==
- Hermannsburg Mission, originally an independent mission society in Hermannsburg, Germany
- Hermannsburg Mission Seminary, a seminary in Hermannsburg, Germany
- Hermannsburg mouse, also known as Hermannsburg (Mission) false-mouse and inland hopping mouse, a mouse endemic to Australia
- Hermannsburg School, an Australian art movement
- Hermannsburg School, South Africa, a school in Natal-KwaZulu, South Africa
  - Hermannsburg Mission House, a heritage site owned by the school
