= Hermannsberg =

Hermannsberg may refer to:

== Places ==
- Hermannsberg (Berching), Berching, Neumarkt in der Oberpfalz, Bavaria
- Hermannsberg (Breitbrunn), Breitbrunn, Haßberge, Bavaria
- Hermannsberg (Durach), Durach, Oberallgäu, Bavaria
- Hermannsberg (Heiligenberg), Heiligenberg, Bodenseekreis, Baden-Württemberg
- Hermannsberg (Illschwang), Illschwang, Amberg-Sulzbach, Bavaria
- Hermannsberg (Leuchtenberg), Leuchtenberg, Neustadt an der Waldnaab, Bavaria
- Hermannsberg (Marienheide), Marienheide
- Hermannsberg (St. Georgen im Schwarzwald), St. Georgen im Schwarzwald, Schwarzwald-Baar-Kreis, Baden-Württemberg
- Hermannsberg (Wiesent), Wiesent, Regensburg, Bavaria

== Mountains and hills ==
(Sorted by height)

- Großer Hermannsberg (867.4 m), near Oberschönau in the Thuringian Forest, Schmalkalden-Meiningen, Thuringia
- Hermannsberg (Hesse) (705.1 m), near Rattlar in the Upland (Rothaar Mountains), Waldeck-Frankenberg, Hesse
- Hermannsberg (West Allgäu) (549.5 m), near Achberg in the West Allgäu Hills, Ravensburg, Baden-Württemberg
- Hermannsberg (Upper Palatine Forest) (522 m), near Leuchtenberg, Neustadt an der Waldnaab, Bavaria
- Hermannsberg (Franconian Switzerland) (479 m), near Aufseß, Bayreuth, Bavaria
- Hermannsberg (Bavarian Forest) (404 m), near Wiesent, Regensburg, Bavaria
- Hermannsberg (Steigerwald) (383 m), near Sand am Main, Haßberge, Bavaria
- Hermannsberg (Teutoburg Forest) (363.7 m), near Hörste in the Teutoburg Forest, Lippe, North Rhine-Westphalia
- Hermannsberg (Beckum Hills) (128.2 m), near Beckum in the Beckum Hills, Warendorf, North Rhine-Westphalia

== Estates ==
- Haus Hermannsberg, wine-growing estate in the Lößnitz with the Hermannsberg Vineyard

== See also ==
- Hermannsburg (disambiguation)
- Herrmann Mountains, in Antarctica, known in German as the Herrmannberge
- Herrmannsberg (disambiguation)
