= Johann Heinrich Christoph Johannes =

German missionary

- Born: 16 August 1852; Lower Saxony State, Germany
- Died: 13 September 1943 (aged 91); Wittenberg Eastern Transvaal South Africa
- Occupation: Missionary
- Spouse: Margarethe Engel Drewes

Johann Heinrich Christoph Johannes was born on 16 August 1852 in the Lower Saxony state, Germany and died on 13 September 1943, in the Eastern Transvaal South Africa He was a missionary in eNyathi, Colony of Natal, South Africa.

== Aspirations ==
Johannes wanted to be teacher as he grew up, but that did not materialize. He came to South Africa. He then started at the Hermannsburg Mission. The mission had a station in Natal South Africa. He belonged to the Evangelical-Lutheran Mission in Lower Saxony. His was from the Kinonbergen congregation.

He studied and trained from 1877 to 1882 in Colony of Natal, South Africa.

== Other missionaries ==
He was one of hundreds of German missionaries who were associated with Hermannsburg Mission through the years. They name the town where they settled in the Colony of Natal, South Africa also Hermannsburg.

== Deployment ==
It was planned that he should work in Zululand, Colony of Natal, South Africa. A war was underway so that did not materialise. He ended up in the northern part of Zululand. He was focussing on the youth. He was then transferred to eNyathi, Colony of Natal South Africa. He succeeded Missionary Weber. He was fluent in Zulu the language spoken by the African people in Zululand. Missionary Johannes was the last white missionary officially to be placed in eNyathi and had a lasting influence on the Zulu community and on the Hermannsburg Mission

== Family life ==
He married Margarethe Engel Drewes (b. 31 Jan 1860) on 29 July 1885 at eNyathi. She came from Germany. They had 7 children: Johann (b. 1886), Katharine (b. 1889), Bernhatd (b. 1891), Heinrich Johannes Siegfried (b. 1893), Heinrich Friedrich Rudolf Johannes (b. 1895), Otto (b. 1897) and Heinrich August Walter Johannes (b.1900)

== Later life ==
Johannes settled in the Eastern Transvaal, South Africa where he died on a place called Wittenberg in 1943
