= Hermannsburg, KwaZulu-Natal =

Hermannsburg
- Location within KwaZulu-Natal Location within South Africa
- Coordinates: 29°02′32″S 30°47′45″E
- Country: South Africa
- Province: KwaZulu-Natal
- District: uMzinyathi
- Municipality: Umvoti
- Established: 2 August 1854
- Time zone: UTC+2 (SAST)
- Postal code (street): 3508
- PO box: 3258
- Area code: 033

Hermannsburg is a small hamlet located in the Province of KwaZulu-Natal in South Africa. It is home to the Hermannsburg School (German: Deutsche Schule Hermannsburg).

== History ==
Hermannsburg was established in 1854 as the first station of the Hermannsburg Missionary Society based in Hermannsburg, Germany. The Hermannsburg Missionary Society was founded on the initiative of Louis Harms, who served the Saints Peter and Paul Lutheran Congregation in Hermannsburg, Germany. Under his leadership, the missionaries originally planned to reach Ethiopia, but were forced to turn back when the Sultan of Zanzibar denied them permission to enter his dominions. They turned back and stopped over in Port Natal (Durban), where local Lutherans in New Germany under the leadership of Wilhelm Posselt encourage them to consider a mission to the Zulu people. The Hermannsburg missionaries accepted and started a mission in South Africa. They bought the farm Perseverance on the edge of Zululand near Greytown as Mpande the king of the Zulus would not allow them to settle in his land.

In 1854, after arrival at the new mission station, the missionaries constructed a large house (the Mission House), which was converted to a museum in 1981.

Some unique aspects of the mission approach of the Hermannsburg Missionary Society included its practice of community of property, its extensive use of lay artisans, and its practice of "colonisation," i.e. having the mission stations form the nucleus of new settlements with the intent of establishing an African Christian civilization.

As the mission blossomed, Louis Harms appointed August Hardeland as the first mission superintendent. August Hardeland arrived in Natal in December, 1859. While his leadership was certainly vigorous and contributed to the organisation and consolidation of the Hermannsburg mission, it was also marked by severe conflict on numerous levels which had a profound impact on the development of the mission and the Lutheran churches that developed out of it.

In 1856 the missionaries started a boarding school, which is still in operation as a private boarding school today.

Various missionaries of the Hermannsburg Mission, supported by laymen- and women, immigrated to South Africa and established mission stations across the region.

In South Africa, five churches have grown out of this initial group of missionaries, namely the ELCSA, ELCSA Cape, ELCSA-NT, LCSA and FELSISA, with further growth in Lutheran churches in Botswana, Lesotho and Swaziland.

Other Lutheran missions also worked in South Africa, as well as in the rest of Africa. The Evangelical Lutheran Church in Southern Africa counts 580,000 baptized members across South Africa, Botswana, and Swaziland. Across the continent, there is an estimated number of 19 million members of Lutheran churches (2011).

== See also ==
- Hermannsburg Mission House
