= Hermannsburg Mission Seminary =

The Hermannsburg Mission Seminary (German: Missionsseminar Hermannsburg) is a seminary in Hermannsburg, Germany. It is part of the Evangelical-Lutheran Mission in Lower Saxony (ELM), the common missionary work of the state churches of Hanover, Brunswick and Schaumburg-Lippe.

== History ==
The mission seminary in Hermannsburg was founded in 1849 by pastor Ludwig Harms, after several young men from Hermannsburg and the surrounding area expressed the wish to be sent out as missionaries and would not be accepted by the existing missionary societies because, as farmers and agricultural workers, they did not have the necessary academic education. So the Hermannsburg Mission began as a "farmers' mission" (Bauernmission).

Having qualified, The first "pupils" were sent overseas in 1854 and founded the work of the Hermannsburg Mission in South Africa, where the Evangelical-Lutheran Mission in Lower Saxony (ELM) is still active today.

Even after the Second World War, spiritual impulses went out from the mission seminary under seminary leader, Olav Hanssen. This resulted in the foundation of groups like Group 153, the Epiphaniaskreis, and the Protestant Gethsemane Monastery in Riechenberg Abbey at Goslar.

Between 1979 and 1993 the seminary was led by Dietrich Mann.

== See also ==
- Hermannsburg School, South Africa
- Hermannsburg Mission House, owned by the school
