= Herrmannsberg =

Herrmannsberg may refer to the following hills in Germany (sorted by height):

- Herrmannsberg (North Palatine Uplands) (536 m), county of Kusel, Rhineland-Palatinate
- Herrmannsberg (Franconian Switzerland) (479 m), near Aufseß, county of Bayreuth, Bavaria
- Herrmannsberg (Lindau) (468 m), near Bodolz, county of Lindau, Bavaria

== See also ==
- Hermannsberg (disambiguation)
- Hermannsburg, a village and a former municipality in the Celle district, in Lower Saxony, Germany
- Herrmann Mountains, in Antarctica, known in German as the Herrmannberge
