= Pulpit Law =

German penal law provision

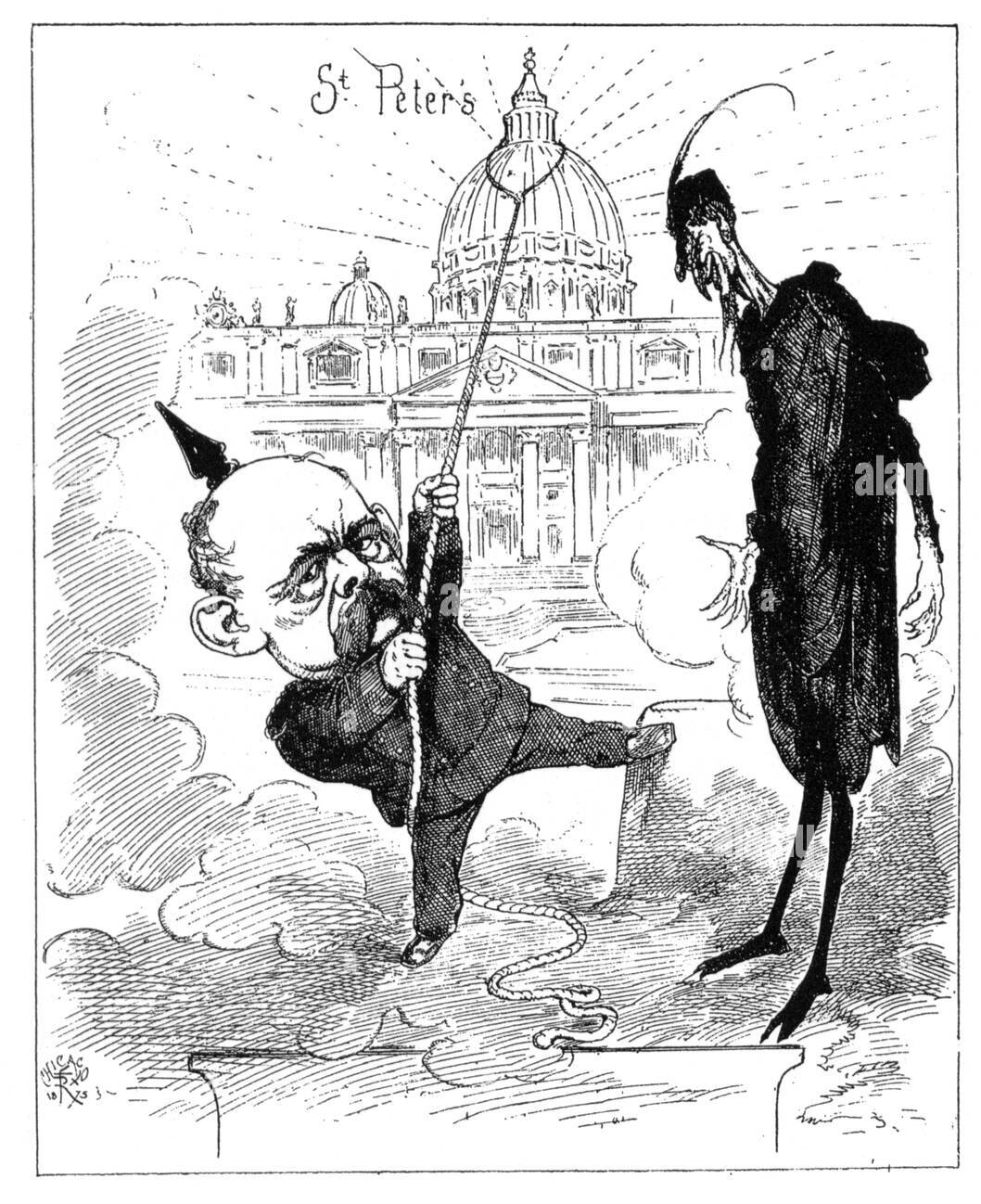
Bismarck tries to tear down the dome of St. Peter's Basilica. Régamey: “Bismarck and Satan” (Chicago, 1875)

The Pulpit Law (German Kanzelparagraph) was a section (§ 130a) to the Strafgesetzbuch (the German Criminal Code) passed by the Reichstag in 1871 during the German Kulturkampf or fight against the Catholic Church. It made it a crime for any cleric in public to make political statements that the government thought would "endanger the public peace." It applied to all of Germany. The law read:

Any cleric or other minister of religion shall be punished with imprisonment or incarceration of up to two years if he, while exercising his occupation or having his occupation exercised, makes state affairs the subject of announcements or discussion either in public before a crowd, in a church, or before any number of people in some other place designated for religious gatherings in such a way that it endangers the public peace.

The passage of the law was part of an anti-clerical campaign including various other laws. Clerics openly resisting these laws were fined or imprisoned and church property was confiscated. By 1872, clerics were banned from teaching in schools and the Jesuits were ordered out of the country. Historian Anthony Steinhoff reports The casualty totals:

As of 1878, only three of eight Prussian dioceses still had bishops, some 1,125 of 4,600 parishes were vacant, and nearly 1,800 priests ended up in jail or in exile....Finally, between 1872 and 1878, numerous Catholic newspapers were confiscated, Catholic associations and assemblies were dissolved, and Catholic civil servants were dismissed merely on the pretence of having Ultramontane sympathies.

The section remained in force until 1953 (in West Germany) and 1968 (In East Germany), though it was rarely enforced after 1878 when Chancellor Otto von Bismarck came to terms with the new Pope. However, several preachers - both Catholic and Protestant - were persecuted by the Nazi regime based on the Pulpit Law. Several religious orders like the Jesuits remained banned from the German Empire, confiscated properties were not returned, a de facto discrimination against the Catholic minority continued in Civil Service positions and civil marriage remained mandatory.
