= Wiesent, Bavaria =

Wiesent
- Municipality
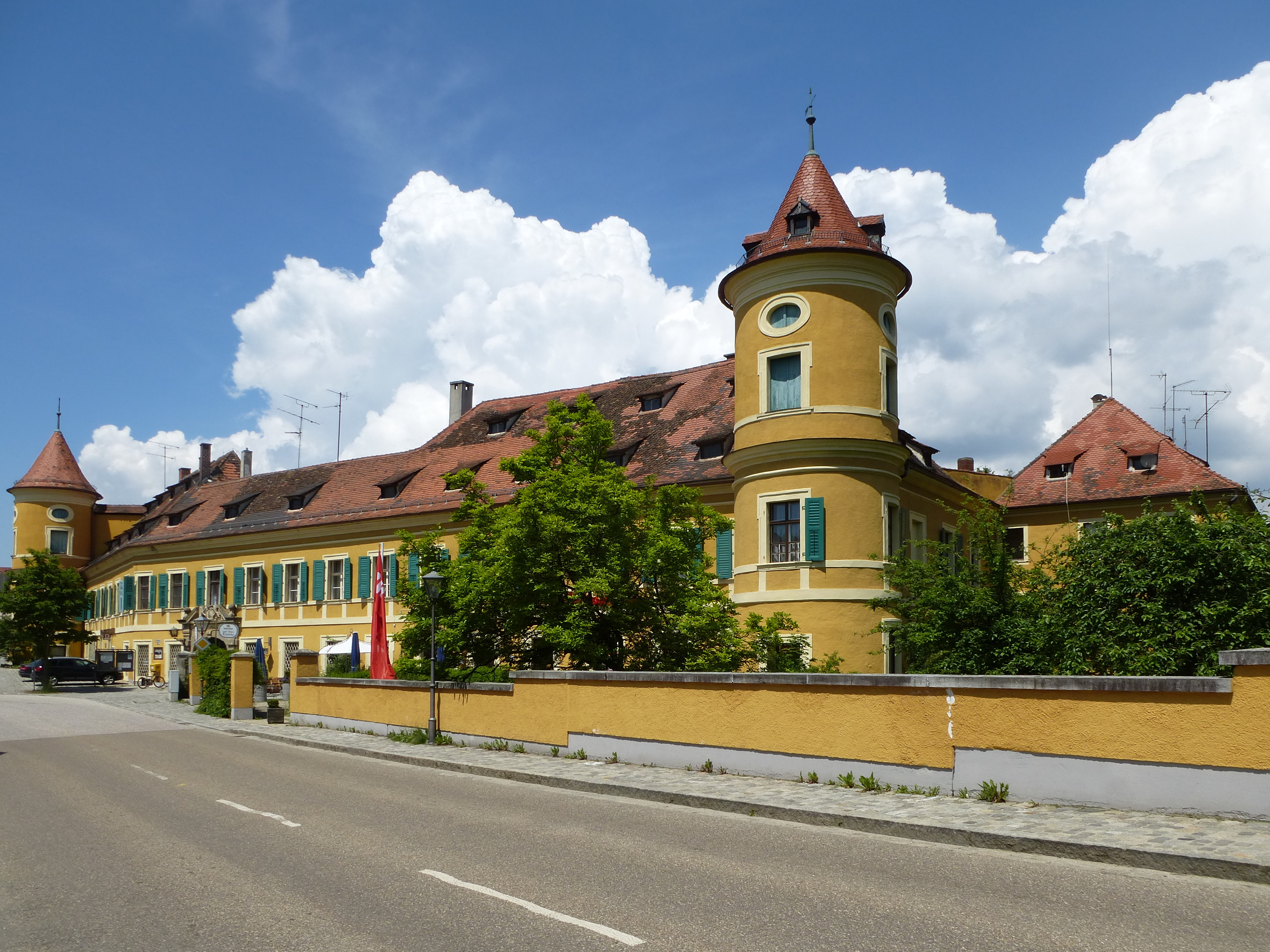
- Wiesent Castle

- Coat of arms

- Location of Wiesent within Regensburg district
- Interactive map of Wiesent
- Location within Germany Location within Bavaria
- Coordinates: 49°00′25″N 12°22′40″E
- Country: Germany
- State: Bavaria
- Admin. region: Oberpfalz
- District: Regensburg

Government
  - Mayor (2020–26): Elisabeth Kerscher (CSU)

Area
  - Total: 26.73 km^{2} (10.32 sq mi)
- Elevation: 332 m (1,089 ft)

Population (2025-12-31)
  - Total: 2,609
  - Density: 97.61/km^{2} (252.8/sq mi)
- Time zone: UTC+01:00 (CET)
  - Summer (DST): UTC+02:00 (CEST)
- Postal codes: 93109
- Dialling codes: 09482
- Vehicle registration: R
- Website: www.wiesent.de

Wiesent (German pronunciation: [ˈviːzɛnt]) is a municipality in the district of Regensburg in Bavaria in Germany.
