= Ad universalis Ecclesiae =

1862 Papul constitution issued by Pius IX

Ad universalis Ecclesiae is a papal constitution dealing with the conditions for admission to Catholic religious orders of men in which solemn vows were prescribed. It was issued by Pope Pius IX on 7 February 1862.

== History ==
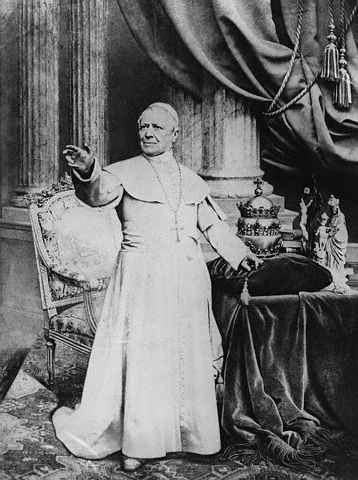
Pope Pius IX

Pius IX had issued, from time to time, various decrees regarding religious. These included:

- Romani Pontifices (25 January 1848)
- Regulari disciplinae (for Italy and adjacent isles, 25 January 1848)
- Neminem Latet (19 March 1857)

These three decrees found their completion and perfection in the constitution Ad universalis Ecclesiae.

== Description ==
This constitution marked a distinct departure from the Tridentine law. It differed both as to the necessary age and other requirements for admission of men to solemn vows in orders, congregations, and institutes in which solemn vows were prescribed. The immediate occasion of its promulgation was the settlement, once and forever, of doubts which had arisen and been presented to the Holy See about the validity of solemn vows made without due observance of the decree Neminem Latet, i.e. without the three years' profession of simple vows.

It said that the Neminem latet regulation was intended to safeguard the religious orders, congregations, and institutes from losing their genuine spirit and former excellence by hastily and imprudently admitting youths having no true vocation and youths whose lives, morals, and bodily and mental endowments had not been properly investigated and no testimonial had been requested of, or received from, the bishop of their native place, or of the places where they had sojourned for the year immediately preceding their admission to the house of postulants.

The Neminem latet decree accomplished this by decreeing that novices, after the completion of their probation and novitiate, should make profession of simple vows for the term of three full years. This also included clerics after reaching sixteen years old or older (prescribed by the Council of Trent), and lay brothers, the age fixed by Pope Clement VIII (in Suprema). After the completion of their term, to be computed from the day of profession to the last hour of the third year, and if found worthy, they were to be admitted to solemn profession. Their superiors, for just and reasonable cause, could postpone the solemn profession. Such postponement was prohibited beyond the twenty-fifth year of age, except in the orders and countries where a longer term of simple profession was conceded by special indult of the Holy See.

Pius IX said that, nevertheless, novices had been admitted to solemn profession without the three years of simple vows. This gave great cause for doubt concerning the validity of the solemn profession. A decision upon that matter was requested from the Holy See. As the Neminem latet decree said nothing about nullity of solemn profession made in opposition to its regulation, the solemn profession made without the prescribed three years of simple vows was valid, though illicit.

In this papal constitution, Pius IX declared:

We, therefore, in a matter of such great importance, desiring to remove all occasion of future doubt, of Our own motion and certain knowledge, and in the plenitude of Our Apostolic power as regards the religious communities of men of whatever order, congregation, or institution in which solemn vows are made, do determine and decree to be null and void and of no value the profession of solemn vows, knowingly or ignorantly, in any manner, colour or pretext, made by novices or lay brothers, who, although they had completed the Tridentine probation and novitiate, had not previously made profession of simple vows and remained in that profession for the entire three years, even though the superiors, or they, or both respectively, had the intention of admitting to, or making, solemn vows, and had used all the ceremonies prescribed for solemn profession.

Women were not included in this law. They, unless special indults were granted, followed the Tridentine regulation until Pope Leo XIII (3 May 1902, Decretum perpensis) enjoined on them the same profession of simple vows for three years prior to the solemn profession, under penalty of nullity.
