= Hermannsburg Mission House =

Heritage site in South Africa

The Hermannsburg Mission House is a provincial heritage site in Hermannsburg, Umvoti District, in the province of KwaZulu-Natal in South Africa. It is owned and operated by the Hermannsburg School.

In 1976 it was described in the Government Gazette of South Africa:

The historic mission house at Hermannsburg was erected around 1862 in the German-Saxon style, in order to provide housing for the staff of the Hermannsburg Mission Station. This building is probably the only German-Saxon house in South Africa.
