= Hermannsberg (Hesse) =

Mountain in Hesse, Germany

Coordinates: 51°18′28″N 8°38′59″E

Highest point
- Elevation: 705.1 m (2,313 ft)

Geography
- Location: Hesse, Germany

Hermannsberg is a mountain of Hesse, Germany.

== Geography ==
=== Location ===

The Hermannsberg is located in the Upland, the northeastern part of the Rothaargebirge, in the Diemelsee Nature Park. Its summit rises approximately 800 m south-southeast of Rattlar and 2.5 km (as the crow flies) north-northwest of Usseln, two Willingen districts. To the east, its landscape slopes down into the valley of the Diemel River and to the west into that of the Wiedbach, a small tributary of the Dommelbach. District Road 65 runs along the Wiedbach stream between Rattlar and Usseln.

Neighboring mountains and elevations of the Hermannsberg include Schetenkopf (approx. 650 m) and Hegekopf (approx. 641 m) to the north, Dommel (738 m) to the north-northeast, Ellenberg (655.5 m) to the northeast, Sähre (726 m) to the southeast, Osterkopf (708.5 m) to the south-southeast, Heimberg (approx. 690 m) to the south, Schneeberg (726.3 m) to the south-southwest, Lüerberg (713 m) to the southwest, and Höhekopf (621.7 m) to the north-northwest.

=== Natural classification ===
The Hermannsberg belongs to the Southern Uplands (No. 33) of the natural main unit group, the Rothaargebirge (including the Hochsauerland) (333), and the Uplands (333.9) subunit, the Inner Uplands (333.90).
