= Louis Harms =

German Lutheran pastor

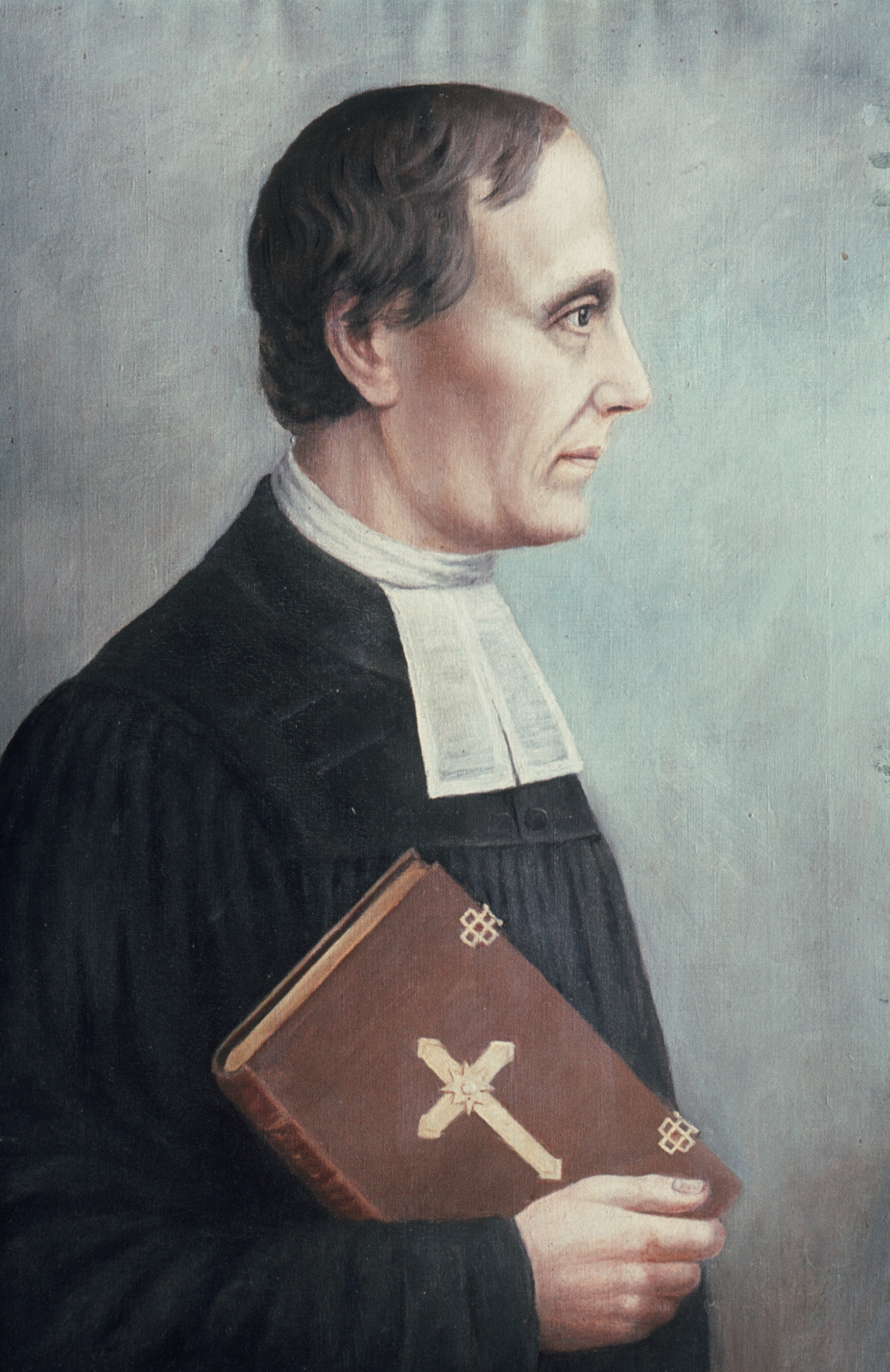
Louis Harms

Georg Ludwig Detlef Theodor Harms (baptised as Ludwig, but called Louis during his life) (1808–1865) was a German Lutheran pastor who was nicknamed the "Reviver of the Heath" (Erwecker der Heide). One of the most significant Christian revivalists of the 19th century, he turned the little village of Hermannsburg on the Lüneburg Heath into the most important centre of revival in Lower Saxony.

== Life ==
=== Youth and training ===
Louis Harms was born on 5 May 1808 in Walsrode in north Germany as the second son of a pastor, Hartwig Christian Harms. His mother was Lucie Dorothee Friederike Harms, née Heinze. In 1817 the family moved to Hermannsburg and, in 1825, Louis Harms went to the secondary school in Celle. After passing his A-levels in Celle, Harms studied Protestant theology in Göttingen from 1827 to 1830. His study forced him to confront the Enlightenment, the leading intellectual movement of his time. When he read the verse John 17:3 "Now this is eternal life: that they might know you, the only true God, and Jesus Christ, whom you have sent" he came in 1830 to the conclusion that "it is not enough, just to be religious and good, to live sensibly and act properly, but that it is essential to have Jesus Christ at the centre of one's life and to testify to that." In the following years his theological thinking was to combine Lutheran faith and pietistic revival pietism.

=== Career development ===
After passing his exam with honours, Louis Harms worked from 1830 to 1840 as a private tutor for the Lord Chamberlain of Linstow in Lauenburg/Elbe. During this time he held Bible studies and, in 1834, and founded the Lauenburg Mission Society.

After Harms had passed two other theological examinations, but still had no prospect of becoming a pastor, he helped his father in Hermannsburg. Then he returned to being a private tutor in 1840 for the family of state architect, Pampel, in Lüneburg. In Lauenburg and Lüneburg he came across slums, moral neglect and children whose lives were a misery. As a result, visits to the poor, the sick and prisoners became a natural consequence of his faith, an approach that was by no means common at that time.

To support his sick father, at the end of 1843, he returned to Hermannsburg. Harms was appointed as curate to relieve his father and was ordained to the ministry on 20 November 1844. In 1846, he managed to turn the parish of Hermannsburg from a "benevolent society" of the Celle Missionary Society into a "mission parish". Through his church services, parlour gatherings in the rectory, home visits and counselling, a revival started in Hermannsburg. At the request of the municipality, Louis Harms was appointed by the Consistory in Hanover for the Evangelical Lutheran State Church of Hanover as the pastor at Hermannsburg after the death of his father in 1849.

Harms had a great gift for speaking in a way that brought things to life. On Sunday evenings, the villagers gathered in the hallway of the rectory to listen to him. His stories simultaneously entertained, instructed and built people up. Local history provided him with lively material. His stories were published in the anthologies Honnig (Low German: "Honey") and Goldene Äpfel in silbernen Schalen ("Golden Apples in Silver Dishes").

Since 1846, at Epiphany on 6 January at irregular intervals, and once a year since 1851, on Saint John's Eve (24 June), the mission festival is held, to which up to 6,000 came. Amongst its best-known visitors were the Hamburg merchant, Johann Hinrich Nagel (1810–1900), and Elise Averdieck (1808–1907), who later founded the Bethesda Deaconess House in Hamburg. Even today, the mission festival is celebrated on a weekend around 24 June in the park of the mission seminary.

=== Hermannsburg ===
On 12 October 1849 Harms founded the Hermannsburg Mission Centre (Missionsanstalt Hermannsburg) by opening the mission seminary. His brother Theodor (1818–1885) was invited to be its first head or Inspektor. The first twelve seminary students studied in what is today the Ludwig Harms House.

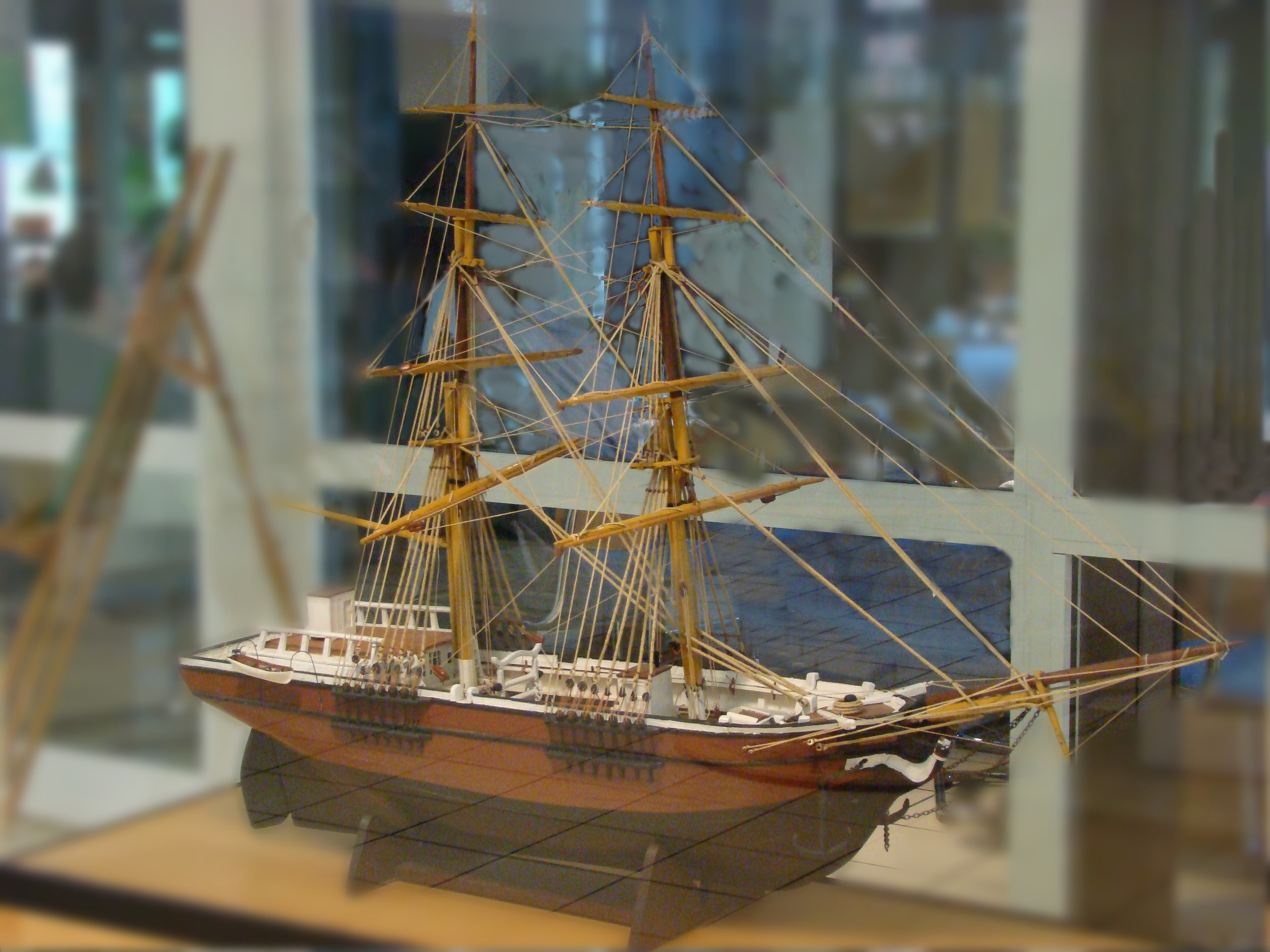
Model of the mission ship, Candace, in Ludwig Harms House in Hermannsburg

In 1853, the first seminary course passed their theological examination before the consistory at Stade and were ordained to the ministry. The first 16 missionaries (including eight tradesmen and peasants) were sent by Louis Harms into mission service and left on 28 October 1853 on the mission ship, Candace. The Candace, which had been launched on 27 September 1853 in Harburg, was financed by donations from friends of the mission, especially those to whom Harms had preached. The Hamburg businessman, Nagel, in particular, stands out. Until its sale in 1874, the ship went on thirteen journeys. The original pennant of the ship is now on display in the Louis Harms House in Hermannsburg.

Louis Harms led the work overseas as mission director from the rectory.

Harms mastered many languages. In addition to his native language of German, he learnt Latin, Greek (modern and ancient Greek), Hebrew, Italian, English and French. After the attempt to get to Ethiopia had failed, the missionaries landed in Port Natal in 1854 (now Durban, South Africa) and began missionary work among the Zulus. In the same year the Hermannsburger Missionsblatt newsletter appeared for first time, a publication that still informs interested parties about the work of the mission. To support the mission work in 1856 also founded a mission trading shop.

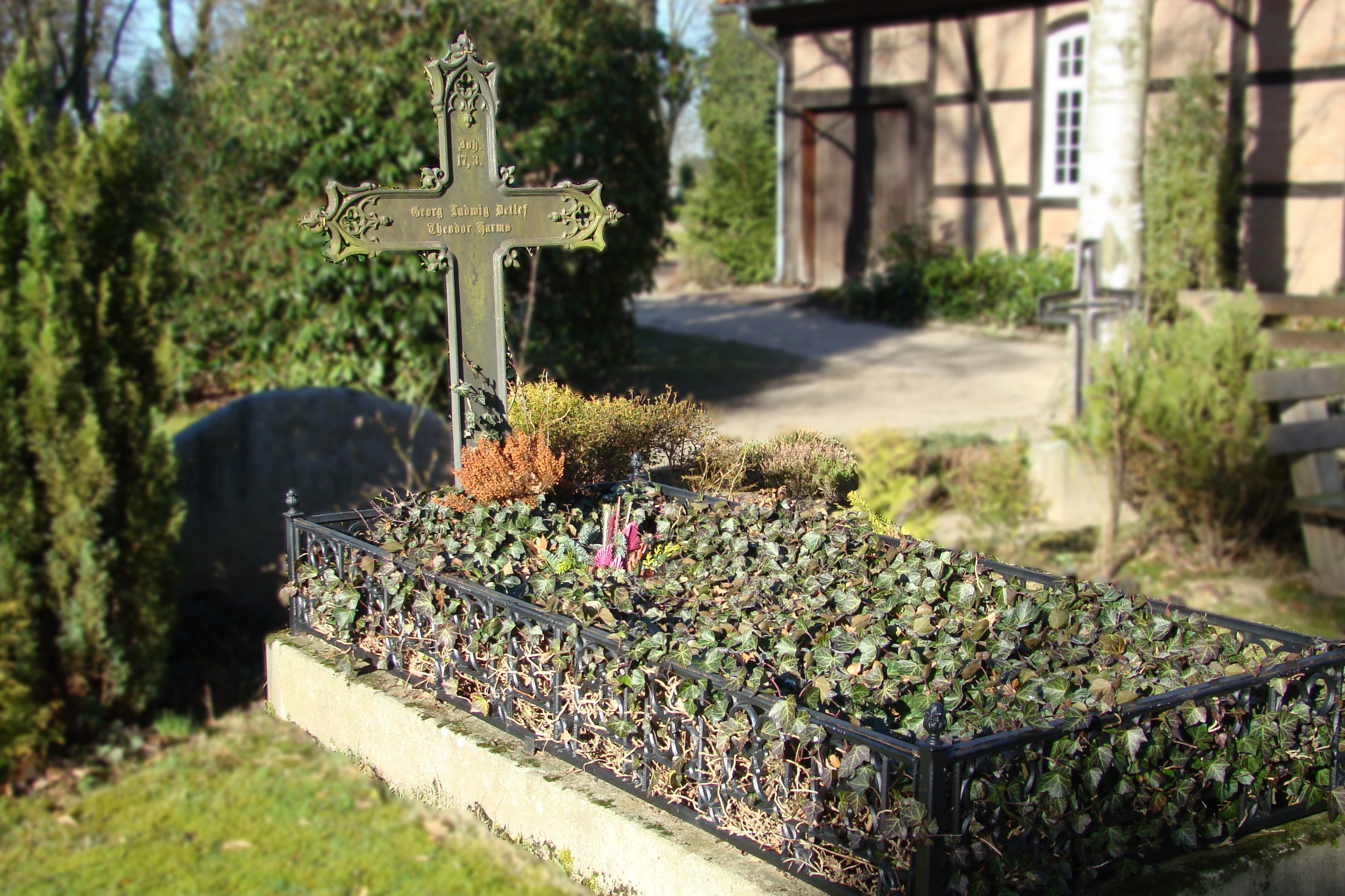
Louis Harm's grave in Hermannsburg Cemetery

Harms also took care of youth offenders after they were released. From 1858 he obtained accommodation and work for them. In 1862 the mission seminary moved to the "New Mission House" where it is today and where young people are trained for missionary service. During the lifetime of Louis Harms, mission work started in India in 1864.

Physically very weakened Louis Harms died on 14 November 1865 in Hermannsburg, after having given his last sermon on 5 November in Hermannsburg's St. Peter and St. Paul's Church. He was buried in Hermannsburg Cemetery. His grave is still there today.

== Hermannsburg Mission today ==
The work of the Hermannsburg Mission is carried on today by the Evangelical-Lutheran Mission in Lower Saxony (ELM), which has been jointly run by the three Lower Saxon state churches of Hanover, Brunswick and Schaumburg-Lippe since 1977.

== Sources ==
- Werner Raupp (Ed.): Mission in Quellentexten. Geschichte der Deutschen Evangelischen Mission von der Reformation bis zur Weltmissionskonferenz Edinburgh 1910, Erlangen/Bad Liebenzell 1990 (ISBN 3-87214-238-0 / 3-88002-424-3), p. 279-283.

== Publications ==
- Evangelien-Predigten (1858), Verlag der Lutherischen Buchhandlung Groß Oesingen 1992.
- Epistel-Predigten (1862), Verlag der Lutherischen Buchhandlung Groß Oesingen 1995.
- In treuer Liebe und Fürbitte, Gesammelte Briefe 1830–1865, Bearbeitet von Hartwig F. Harms und Jobst Reller, Quellen und Beiträge zur Geschichte der Hermannsburger Mission Bd. 12, LIT-Verlag 2004.

== Literature ==
- Hugald Grafe: Die volkstümliche Predigt des Ludwig Harms. Ein Beitrag zur Predigt- und Frömmigkeitsgeschichte im 19. Jahrhundert. Vandenhoeck & Ruprecht, Göttingen ²1974
- Ernst-August Lüdemann (Hg.): Vision Gemeinde weltweit – 150 Jahre Hermannsburger Mission und Ev.luth. Missionswerk in Niedersachsen (ELM). Hermannsburg 2000
- Ernst-August Lüdemann (Hg.): Ludwig Harms Grüße alle meine Kinder, die weißen und die schwarzen, Briefe eines Missionsdirektors nach Südafrika 1861–1865, Hermannsburg 1998
- Jobst Reller, Hartwig F. Harms: Gelebte Liebe und deutliche Worte. Louis Harms – Hermannsburger Pastor und Missionsgründer. Verlag Ludwig-Harms-Haus, Hermannsburg 2008
- Jobst Reller: Heidepastor Ludwig Harms – Begründer der Hermannsburger Mission. Hänssler Verlag Stuttgart 2008
- Julius August Wagenmann (1879). "Harms, Ludwig". Allgemeine Deutsche Biographie (in German). Vol. 10. Leipzig: Duncker & Humblot. pp. 612–614.
- Friedrich Wilhelm Bautz (1990). "Harms, Ludwig (Louis)". In Bautz, Friedrich Wilhelm (ed.). Biographisch-Bibliographisches Kirchenlexikon (BBKL) (in German). Vol. 2. Hamm: Bautz. cols. 545–553. ISBN 3-88309-032-8.
