= Hermannsburg Mission =

German Christian mission society

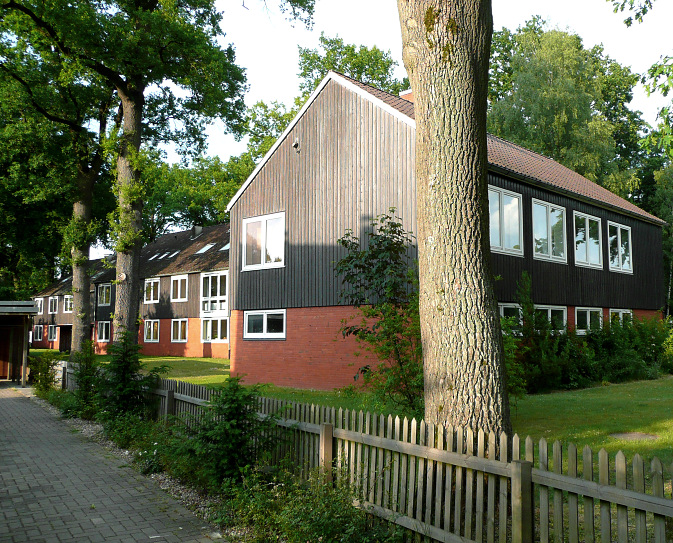
Residential building of the Hermannsburg Mission

The Hermannsburg Mission (German: Hermannsburger Mission) was founded as the Hermannsburg Mission Centre (Missionsanstalt Hermannsburg) in 1849 in Hermannsburg, near Celle, North Germany, by Louis Harms. In 1977, the independent mission society was merged into the work of the Evangelical-Lutheran Mission in Lower Saxony. As a result, it became an institution recognised by the state church.

== History ==
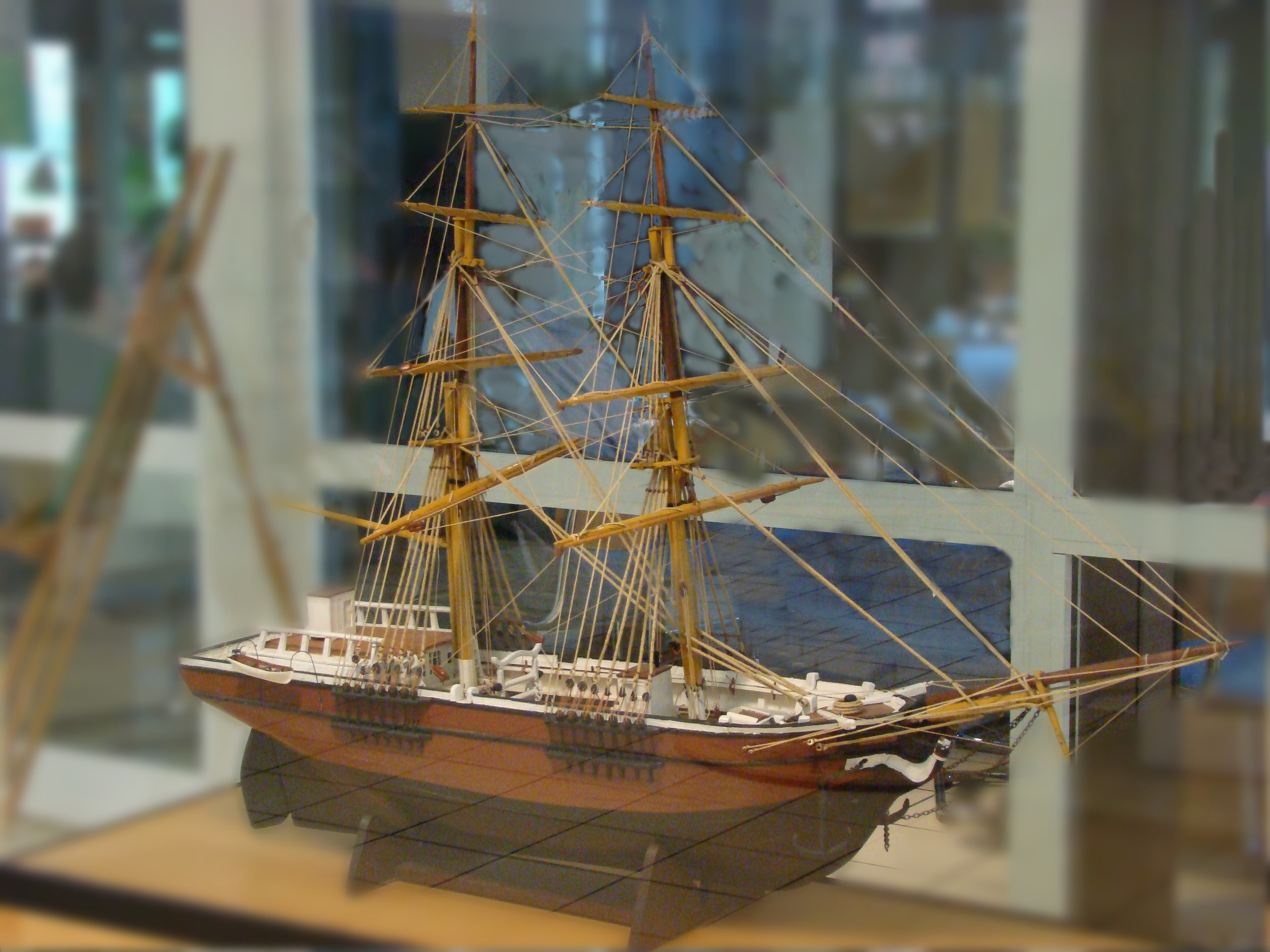
Model of the mission ship Candace

On 12 October 1849, Ludwig ("Louis") Harms (1808–1865) founded the Hermannsburg Mission Seminary. This date counts as the foundation date for the Hermannsburg Mission. Harms served at St. Peter and St. Paul's Church in Hermannsburg from 1844, first as an assistant pastor (curate) and later as the parish pastor. He was considered a good minister by the community and had a great talent for bringing things alive. On Sunday evenings, the villagers gathered in the hallway of the rectory to listen to him. His stories simultaneously entertained, instructed and built people up. Local history provided him with lively material. His stories were published in the anthology Honnig (Low German for "Honey") and Goldene Äpfel in silbernen Schalen ("Golden Apples in Silver Dishes").

With his preaching Harms sparked a revival movement that reached as far as the patricians in nearby Hamburg. On 12 October 1849, the first students moved into the Hermannsburg Mission Seminary, newly founded by Harms. He appointed his brother, Theodor, as the first director. Harms campaigned tirelessly for donations. The eloquent and energetic evangelist managed to interest a large number of poor men from the heath in mission service, not unlike the effect that David Livingstone had on the poor of Scotland.

Harms had a vision to begin his missionary work with the Oromo people (then called the Galla) in East Africa. The necessary funds were raised from the Hermannsburg congregation and later a large circle of friends. He even succeeded in building his own mission ship, the Candace, which was named after the Ethiopian queen, Candace, mentioned in Acts 8.27. The attempt to get to Ethiopia, failed however. Consequently, the Hermannsburg missionaries landed at Port Natal (now Durban) in South Africa in 1854. There they began to work among the Zulu people, and from 1857, were also operating in the Transvaal. In 1859 they established a mission station in Shoshong and in 1864, August Mylius started his work with the Telugu in southern India.

== Expansion of the work ==
After the death of Louis Harms, his brother Theodor Harms (1818–1885) became his successor. Under his leadership, the seminary and missionary activity was further expanded. In 1879, the second mission house was built and Carl Mützelfeldt (1842–1927) became its first director in the appointment of "mission inspector". Under the leadership of Theodor Harms', successors, Egmont Harms, (1885–1916) and George Haccius (1916–1926) the missionary work was strengthened . New areas were opened up: Australia (1866), North America (1866), New Zealand (1875), Iran (1880), Brazil (1898 ) and Ethiopia (1927). In the long run, however, not all areas could continue to be supported.

== Emergence of the Hermannsburg free church and consequences for the mission ==
After the annexation of the Kingdom of Hanover by Prussia opposition was stirring, especially in Hermannsburg to the introduction by the King of Prussia of compulsory civil marriage in 1876 and the adoption of a new marriage liturgy in the state.

Theodor Harms was especially vehement in his opposition. As a result, Harms and a number of other pastors were removed from office. He left the Evangelical Lutheran State Church of Hanover and was followed by the majority of the Hermannsburg community. On 13 February 1878, they established the Lutheran Church of the Cross, independently of the state church. At the Synod in Hermannsburg on 30 April 1878, under the chairmanship of Theodore Harms, pastors and representatives of the independent churches of the country founded the Hanoverian Evangelical Lutheran Free Church. In 1886, they split again. Thirteen parishes formed the "Hermannsburg Free Church".

Separation from the state church had serious consequences for the Hermannsburg Mission. Collections from the Hanoverian national church and its character as the public body were both lost. In 1890, there was an agreement between the Hanover church and the Hermannsburg Free Church. So that members of both the state and free church were represented in the mission's management, the office of co-director (Kondirektor) was created, which existed until 1972

== Mission directors ==
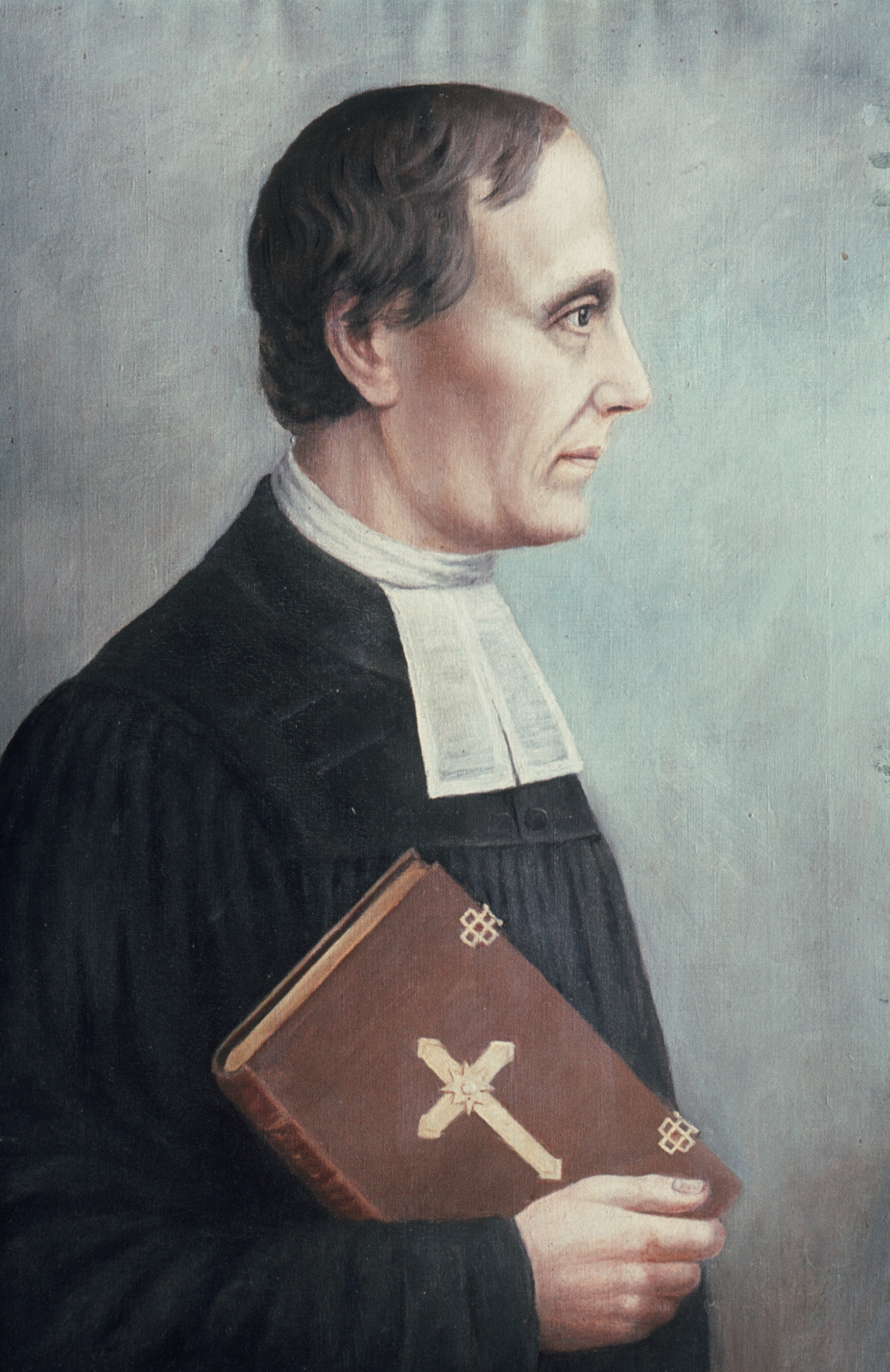
Louis Harms

The head of the mission is known as the director (Direktor)

- 1849 to 1865 Louis Harms (baptised as Ludwig, but called Louis, born 5 May 1808, died 14 November 1865)
- 1865 to 1885 Theodor Harms (born 19 March 1819, died 16 February 1885)
- 1885 to 1916 Egmont Harms (born 15 April 1859, died 4 December 1916)
  (1890 to 1916 together with Georg Haccius)
- 1890 to 1926 Georg Haccius (born 22 July 1847, died 4 June 1926)
- 1926 to 1943 Christoph Schomerus (born 23 November 1871, died 8 August 1944)
- 1943 to 1959 August Elfers (born 18 July 1897, died 6 July 1959)
- 1959 to 1974 Hans-Robert Wesenick (born 18 December 1904, died 15 November 1988)
- 1975 to 1988 Reinhart Müller (born 8 April 1925, died 3 April 2006)
- 1989 to 2003 Ernst-August Lüdemann
- since 2003 Martina Helmer-Pham Xuan

== Hermannsburg Mission today ==
In 1977, the formal integration of the Hermannsburg Mission into the state church took place. By maintaining the legal status of the foundation, however, it remained possible to preserve the special character of the spiritual work here. As the Evangelical-Lutheran Mission in Lower Saxony (ELM), it continues to be based in Hermannsburg. The head of the mission's work since 2003 is Rev. Martina Helmer-Pham Xuan.

The most important contributors to the work are the Evangelical-Lutheran state churches of Hanover, Brunswick and Schaumburg-Lippe. In addition, many parishes and friends of the mission support its work. The ELM is also supported by private donations from many people in the region. Currently missionaries and missionaries sent out by the ELM are working in Africa, Latin America, India and Siberia.

The mission maintains a mission seminary in Hermannsburg to this day, where young theologians are prepared for service within one of the partner churches of the ELM. The Ludwig Harms House in Hermannsburg, in whose building the mission seminary was originally based, is now a modern conference centre with a cafe, bookshop and "One World Shop". It houses an exhibition called "Candace - Mission Possible" to inform those interested about the work and worldwide network of the ELM.

== See also ==
- Hermannsburg Mission Seminary

== Sources ==
- Ernst Bauerochse: Ihr Ziel war das Oromoland, Die Anfänge der Hermannsburger Mission in Äthiopien, Quellen und Beiträge zur Geschichte der Hermannsburger Mission Bd. 14, LIT-Verlag 2006.
- Georg Gremels (Hrsg.): Die Hermannsburger Mission und das „Dritte Reich“. Zwischen faschistischer Verführung und lutherischer Beharrlichkeit. Quellen und Beiträge zur Geschichte der Hermannsburger Mission Bd. 13, LIT-Verlag 2005.
- Georg Gremels (Hrsg.): Eschatologie und Gemeindeaufbau. Hermannsburger Missionsgeschichte im Umfeld lutherischer Erweckung, Quellen und Beiträge zur Geschichte der Hermannsburger Mission Bd. 11, Hermannsburg 2004.
- Hartwig Harms: Träume und Tränen, Hermannsburger Missionare und die Wirkungen ihrer Arbeit in Australien und Neuseeland, Quellen und Beiträge zur Geschichte der Hermannsburger Mission Bd. 10, Hermannsburg 2003.
- Ludwig Harms: Grüße alle meine Kinder, die weißen und die schwarzen … (Briefe eines Missionsdirektors 1861–1865), Quellen und Beiträge zur Geschichte der Hermannsburger Mission Bd. 6, Hermannsburg 1998.
- Ludwig Harms: In treuer Liebe und Fürbitte, Gesammelte Briefe 1830–1865, Quellen und Beiträge zur Geschichte der Hermannsburger Mission Bd. 12, LIT-Verlag 2004.
- Geschichte der Hannoverschen evangelisch-lutherischen Freikirche. Herausgegeben von dem Pastorenkonvent, Celle 1924
- Fritz Hasselhorn: Bauernmission in Südafrika. Die Hermannsburger Mission im Spannungsfeld der Kolonialpolitik 1880–1939, Erlangen 1988.
- Ludwig Harms Symposium (Hrsg.) Georg Haccius – Leben und Werk, Quellen und Beiträge zur Geschichte der Hermannsburger Mission Bd. 5, Hermannsburg 1993.
- Ernst-August Lüdemann (Hrsg.), Vision Gemeinde weltweit – 150 Jahre Hermannsburger Mission und Ev.-luth. Missionswerk in Niedersachsen (ELM), Hermannsburg 2000.
- Ernst-August Lüdemann (Hrsg.): Ludwig Harms Grüße alle meine Kinder, die weißen und die schwarzen, Briefe eines Missionsdirektors nach Südafrika 1861–1865, Hermannsburg 1998.
- Joachim Lüdemann, August Mylius (1819–1887), Lutherische Missionarsexistenz in Tamilnadu und Andhra Pradesh, Studien zur Orientalischen Kirchengeschichte 15, Hamburg 2003.
- Reinhart Müller, (Hrsg.): Aus der Heide in die Welt, Quellen und Beiträge zur Geschichte der Hermannsburger Mission Bd. 4, Hermannsburg 1988.
- Reinhart Müller: Die vergessenen Söhne Hermannsburgs in Nordamerika, Quellen und Beiträge zur Geschichte der Hermannsburger Mission Bd. 7, Hermannsburg 1998.
- Reinhart Müller: Hermannsburger in Lateinamerika, Quellen und Beiträge zur Geschichte der Hermannsburger Mission Bd. 8, Hermannsburg 2001.
- Wolfgang Proske: Botswana und die Anfänge der Hermannsburger Mission; Voraussetzungen, Verlauf und Scheitern eines lutherischen Missionierungsversuches im Spannungsfeld divergierender politischer Interessen, Frankfurt a. M. 1989.
- Gunther Schendel: Die Missionsanstalt Hermannsburg und der Nationalsozialismus. LIT-Verlag, Münster 2009, ISBN 978-3-8258-0627-9.
