= Evangelical-Lutheran Mission in Lower Saxony =

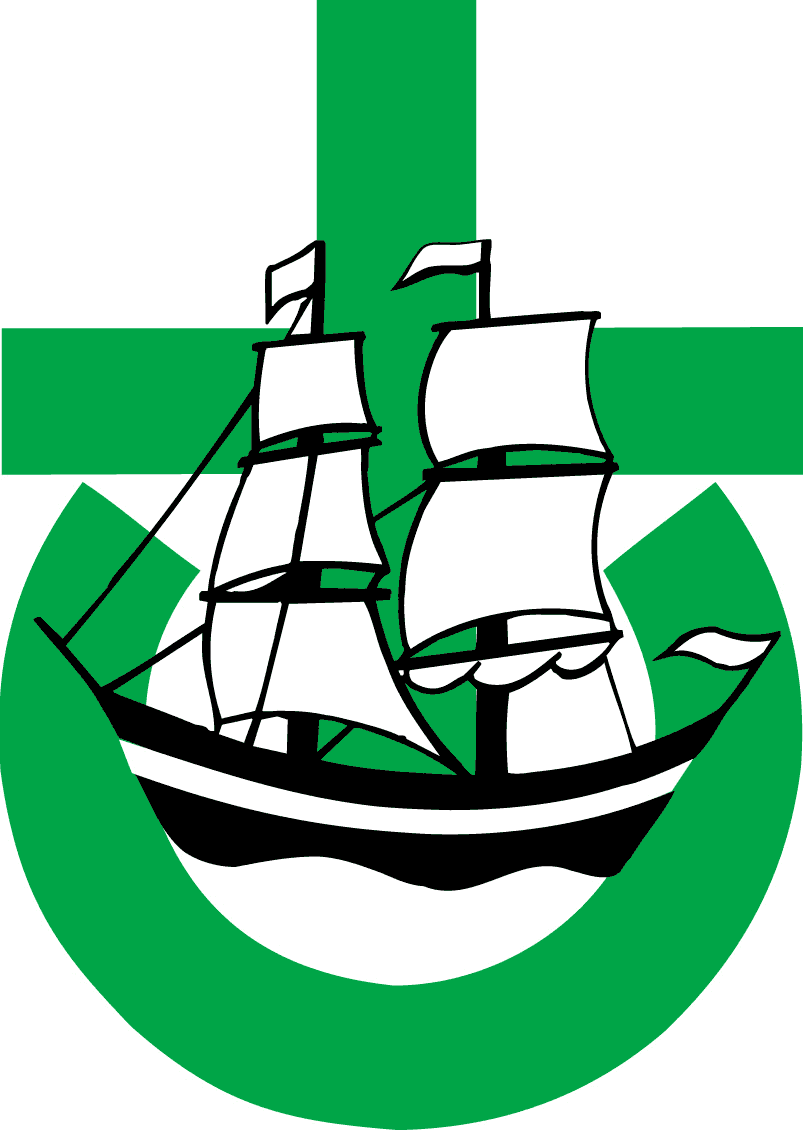
Logo of the ELM

The Evangelical-Lutheran Mission in Lower Saxony (German: Evangelisch-lutherische Missionswerk in Niedersachsen) or ELM is a German Protestant mission organisation.

== Purpose ==
The declared mission of the ELM is "... the holistic proclamation of the Gospel in word and deed, through people and projects, in a context which is appropriate to our partner and member churches."

== History ==
On 12 October 1849 the Hermannsburg pastor, Ludwig Harms, began training the first missionaries. At the outset it was called the Hermannsburg Mission (Hermannsburg Mission). Even today young men are trained for service in the church worldwide at the Hermannsburg Mission Seminary (Missionsseminar Hermannsburg).

On 25 May 1977 the ELM was founded as a common facility for the Protestant-Lutheran state churches of Hanover, Brunswick and Schaumburg-Lippe from the amalgamation of the Hermannsburg Mission Centre (also called the Hermannsburg Mission) with the Hildesheim HQ of the Protestant-Lutheran Mission (Leipzig Mission) of Erlangen.

It works closely with the Hessian regional churches (Protestant Church in Hesse and Nassau, Evangelical Church of Hesse Electorate-Waldeck), the Protestant Church of Augsburg Confession of Alsace and Lorraine and over 20 mission and friends' societies.

It retains the legal status of a charity. The headquarters of the ELM (Lower Saxony) is in Hermannsburg. A branch in Hildesheim was closed on 30 June 2006.

Following the fall of the Berlin Wall, the Leipzig Mission was disbanded in 1992 and the Leipzig Evangelical-Lutheran Mission was founded with its base in Leipzig. The focus of its work is India. However, the ELM continues to carry out its own work in India as an independent partner alongside the Leipzig Mission.

== The ELM today ==
Today, the Evangelical-Lutheran Mission in Lower Saxony operates worldwide, sending staff out to the Lutheran churches in Africa, Asia and Latin America and financially supporting their communities and projects.

In 2007 it was working in cooperation with 19 churches in 17 countries abroad. The main focus of effort is in Ethiopia, southern Africa (South Africa, Botswana, Malawi, Swaziland), Latin America (Brazil, Peru), India and non-European Russia.

In addition to theologians the ELM dispatches medical specialists, teachers, craftsmen and farming and administrative experts abroad. In addition it has an annual voluntary programme to give young men the opportunity to work with a partner church and experience different cultures. The ELM is a recognised sending organisation as part of the Volunteer Service of the German Federal Ministry for Economic Cooperation and Development across the world.

The official publication of the ELM is the journal Mitteilen ("Inform") which is issued 6 times a year jointly with other missions.

In the Ludwig-Harms House in Hermannsburg, a conference and management centre with a small café-restaurant, there is an exhibition called Candace - Mission possible which gives an insight into the worldwide work of the ELM and its partner churches.

The ELM is a member of the Evangelical Mission in Germany (EMW).

== Sources and Literature ==
- Mittendrin - Das ELM stellt sich vor. Hermannsburg 2003
- Helmer-Pham Xuan, Martina (Hg.): Jahresbericht 2006/2007. Hermannsburg 2006.
- Lüdemann, Ernst-August (Hg.): Vision Gemeinde weltweit - 150 Jahre Hermannsburger Mission und Ev.luth. Missionswerk in Niedersachsen (ELM). Hermannsburg 2000.
