= Hermannsburg School, South Africa =

Hermannsburg School

Location
- Hermannsburg, KwaZulu-Natal (Umzinyathi District Municipality); South Africa; 29.0416°S 30.7965°E

Information
- Type: Independent private school
- Established: 1856
- Grades: Kindergarten through Grade 12
- Website: www.hmbschool.co.za

Hermannsburg School, originally Deutsche Schule Hermannsburg, is a private school in Hermannsburg, KwaZulu-Natal, South Africa.

The Central Agency for German Schools Abroad listed it as an international school in 2015, but as of 2025 no longer lists it.

== History ==
The Deutsche Schule Hermannsburg was established by German missionaries in 1856, making it the oldest boarding school in the province, then Natal.

In 1965 it had 14 teachers and 307 students.

In 2015 the German government stopped funding the school, as the school would have needed to adopt the German curriculum, which it could not do. Then, a former student named Zola Mkumla, who graduated in 1997, purchased the school. Mkumla acquired the school in 2020.

== Description ==
Hermannsburg School serves Grade levels RRRR (18 months) through Grade 12 (18 years).

Hermannsburg has English as its main language of instruction, although it has an intense German language programme. Zulu language, as a subject, is also offered in the school, as a second language alongside Afrikaans. Music and outdoor activities are other focus areas, besides the academic programme.

The school offers boarding facilities, and day students from Greytown, 25 kilometres (16 mi) away, and Kranskop, 15 kilometres (9.3 mi) away may use a bus service provided by the school.

== Campus ==
There are three boarding facilities in the school and they are available for students in Grades 8–12. The Männerheim serves boys in Grades 8–12. Mädchenheim serves girls in Grades 8 and 9, while Neues Mädchenheim serves girls in Grades 10–12. All the boarding establishments accommodate the students in shared rooms of 2 or 3 students per room.

The primary school and kindergarten are separate from the High School. Both the junior school and the senior school have their own computer centres and libraries.

The school has extensive sporting facilities, including a swimming pool, tennis/basketball courts, rugby, cricket, hockey and soccer fields as well as volleyball nets.
