= Christianity in the 12th century =

Medallion of Christ from Constantinople, c. 1100.

Christianity in the 12th century was marked by scholastic development and monastic reforms in the western church and a continuation of the Crusades, namely with the Second Crusade in the Holy Land.

== Investiture controversies ==
Two investiture controversies ended in the 12th century, both concerning whether secular or religious authorities could appoint bishops.

One was between the Pope and the Holy Roman Emperor, which ran from 1076 (starting between Pope Gregory VII and Emperor Henry IV) until 1122, when Pope Callixtus II and Emperor Henry V agreed on the Concordat of Worms. The agreement differentiated between the royal and spiritual powers and gave the emperors a limited role in selecting bishops in Germany. The selection of bishops was granted to their cathedral canons. As a symbol of the compromise, lay authorities invested bishops with their secular authority symbolised by the lance, and ecclesiastical authorities invested bishops with their spiritual authority symbolised by the ring and the staff.

The second was between King Henry I of England and Pope Paschal II, starting in 1102. The English dispute was resolved by the Concordat of London, 1107, where the king renounced his claim to invest bishops but continued to require an oath of fealty from them upon their election. This was a partial model for the Concordat of Worms.

== Medieval Inquisition ==
The Medieval Inquisition is a series of inquisitions (Roman Catholic Church bodies charged with suppressing heresy) from around 1184, including the Episcopal Inquisition (1184–1230s) and later the Papal Inquisition (1230s). It was in response to movements within Europe considered apostate or heretical to Western Catholicism, in particular the Cathars and the Waldensians in southern France and northern Italy. These were the first inquisition movements of many that would follow. The inquisitions in combination with the Albigensian Crusade were fairly successful in ending heresy.

12th-century France witnessed the widespread growth of Catharism, a dualistic belief in extreme asceticism which taught that all matter was evil, accepted suicide and denied the value of Church sacraments.

== Rise of universities ==
Modern western universities have their origins directly in the Medieval Church. They began as cathedral schools, and all students were considered clerics. This was a benefit as it placed the students under ecclesiastical jurisdiction and thus imparted certain legal immunities and protections. The cathedral schools eventually became partially detached from the cathedrals and formed their own institutions, the earliest being the University of Paris (c. 1150), the University of Bologna (1088), and the University of Oxford (1096).

== Church architecture ==
Two new orders of architecture emerged from the Church of this era. The earlier Romanesque style combined massive walls, rounded arches and ceilings of masonry. To compensate for the absence of large windows, interiors were brightly painted with scenes from the Bible and the lives of the saints. Later, the Basilique Saint-Denis marked a new trend in cathedral building when it utilized Gothic architecture. This style, with its large windows and high, pointed arches, improved lighting and geometric harmony in a manner that was intended to direct the worshiper's mind to God who "orders all things".

Eight new monastic orders were founded in the 12th century, many of them functioning as Military Knights of the Crusades. Cistercian monk Bernard of Clairvaux exerted great influence over the new orders and produced reforms to ensure purity of purpose. His influence led Pope Alexander III to begin reforms that would lead to the establishment of canon law.

== Early scholasticism and its contemporaries ==
Scholasticism comes from the Latin word scholasticus meaning "that [which] belongs to the school"; it was a method of learning taught by the academics (or schoolmen) of medieval universities c.1100–1500. Scholasticism originally began to reconcile the philosophy of the ancient classical philosophers with medieval Christian theology. It is not a philosophy or theology in itself but a tool and method for learning which puts emphasis on dialectical reasoning. The primary purpose of scholasticism was to find the answer to a question or resolve a contradiction. It is most well known in its application in medieval theology but was eventually applied to classical philosophy and many other fields of study.

Anselm of Canterbury is sometimes called the 'Father of Scholasticism' because of the prominent place that reason has in his theology; instead of establishing his points by appeal to authority, he presents arguments to demonstrate why it is that the things he believes on authority must be so. His particular approach, however, was not very influential in his time, and he kept his distance from the Cathedral Schools. Instead, scholasticism likely was fostered by the production of the gloss on Scripture associated with Anselm of Laon, the rise to prominence of dialectic (middle subject of the medieval trivium) in the work of Abelard, and the production by Peter Lombard of a collection of Sentences or opinions of the Church Fathers and other authorities. Scholasticism proper can be thought of as the kind of theology that emerges when, in the Cathedral schools and their successors, the tools of dialectic are pressed into use to comment upon, explain, and develop the gloss and the sentences.

Notable authors include:

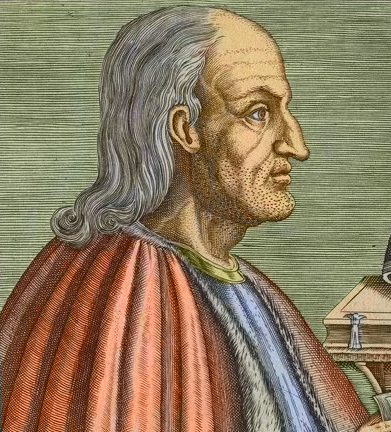
- Anselm of Canterbury
  Anselm of Canterbury
- Anselm of Laon
- Hugh of St Victor
- Richard of St Victor
- Peter Abelard
- Bernard of Clairvaux
- Hildegard of Bingen
- Peter Lombard
- Joachim of Fiore
- Aelred of Rievaulx

== Monasticism ==
The next wave of monastic reform came with the Cistercian Movement. The first Cistercian abbey was founded by Robert of Molesme in 1098, at Cîteaux Abbey. The keynote of Cistercian life was a return to a literal observance of the Rule of Saint Benedict. Rejecting the developments that the Benedictines had undergone, they tried to reproduce the life exactly as it had been in Saint Benedict's time, indeed in various points they went beyond it in austerity. The most striking feature in the reform was the return to manual labour, and especially to field-work, which became a special characteristic of Cistercian life.

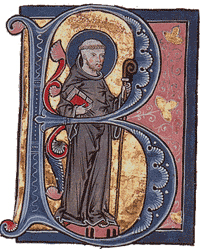
Saint Bernard of Clairvaux, in a medieval illuminated manuscript.

Inspired by Saint Bernard of Clairvaux, the Cistercians became the main force of technological diffusion in medieval Europe. By the end of the 12th century the Cistercian houses numbered 500; in the 13th a hundred more were added; and at its height in the 15th century, the order claimed to have close to 750 houses. Most of these were built in wilderness areas and played a major part in bringing such isolated parts of Europe into economic cultivation.

In the Middle Ages, monasteries conserved and copied ancient manuscripts in their scriptoria, their pharmacies stored and studied medicaments and they aided the development of agricultural techniques. The requirement of wine for the Mass led to the development of wine culture, as shown in the discovery of the méthode champenoise by Dom Perignon. Several liquors such as the Trappist beers were also developed in monasteries.

The consequence of this centralisation of knowledge was that they initially controlled both public administration and education, where the trivium led through the quadrivium to theology. Christian monks cultivated the arts as a way of praising God. Gregorian chant and miniatures are examples of the practical application of quadrivium subjects. However, the dialectical dispute between Peter Abelard and William of Champeaux in the early 12th century over the methods of philosophic ontology led to a schism between the Catholic Orthodox of the School of Notre Dame in Paris and the student body, leading to the establishment of Free Schools and the concept of an autonomous University, soon copied elsewhere in Europe, and this eventually led to the Reformation which dismounted the primacy of the monasteries.

The status of monks as apart from secular life (at least theoretically) also served a social function. Dethroned Visigothic kings were tonsured and sent to a monastery so that they could not claim the crown back. Monasteries became a place for second sons to live in celibacy so that the family inheritance went to the first son; in exchange the families donated to the monasteries. Few cities lacked both a St Giles house for lepers outside the walls and a Magdalene house for prostitutes and other women of notoriety within the walls, and some orders were favored by monarchs and rich families to keep and educate their maiden daughters before arranged marriage.

== Crusades ==
=== Crusade of 1101 ===
There was a less successful wave of crusaders, in which Turks led by Kilij Arslan soundly defeated the Crusaders in three separate battles in a well-managed response to the First Crusade. This is known as the Crusade of 1101 and may be considered an adjunct of the First Crusade.

=== Second Crusade, 1147–1149 ===
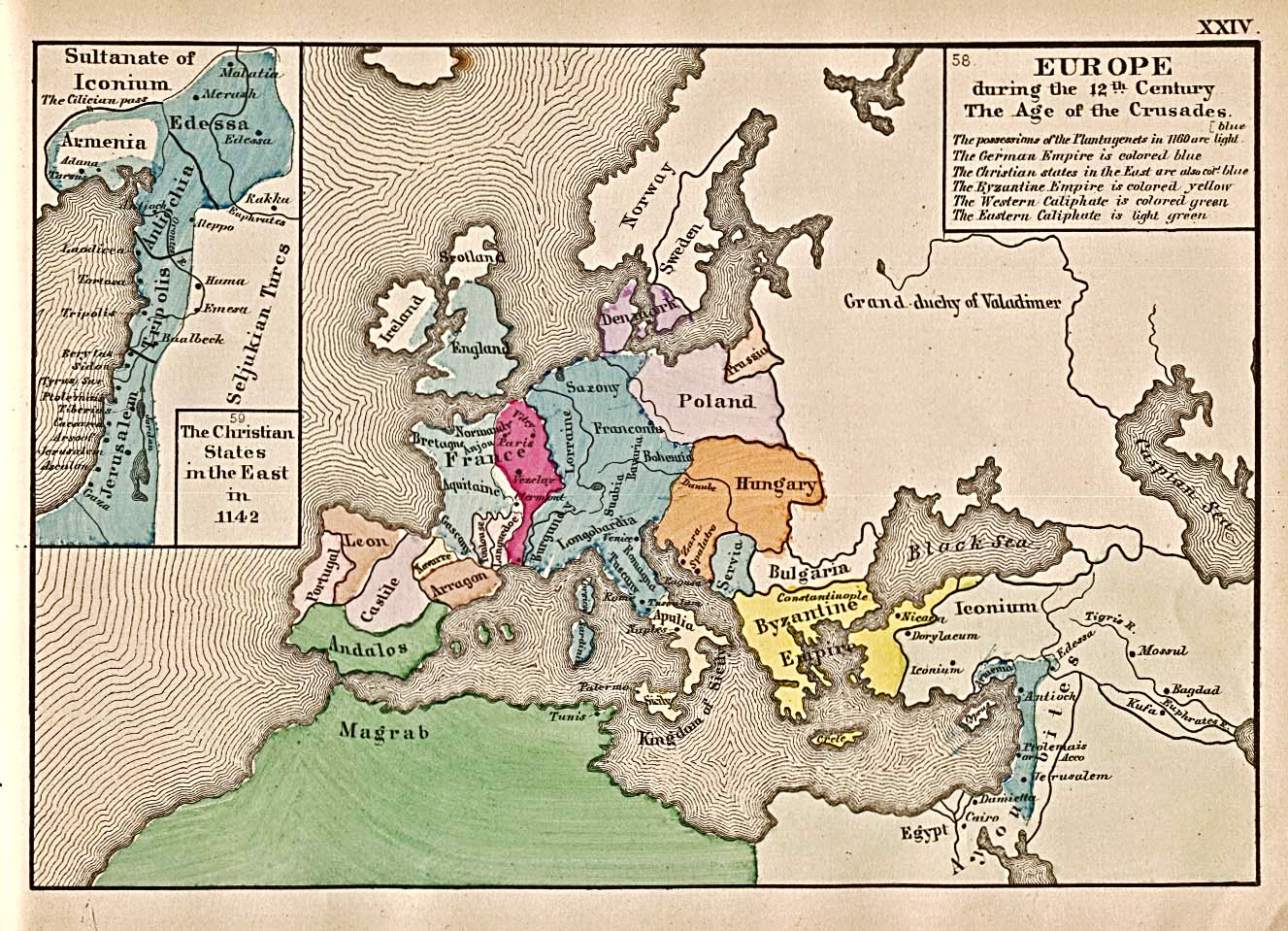
The status of Europe in 1142

After a period of relative peace in which Christians and Muslims co-existed in the Holy Land, Muslims conquered the town of Edessa. A new crusade was called for by various preachers, most notably by Bernard of Clairvaux.

French and south German armies, under the Kings Louis VII and Conrad III respectively, marched to Jerusalem in 1147 but failed to win any major victories, launching a failed pre-emptive siege of Damascus, an independent city that would soon fall into the hands of Nur ad-Din Zangi, the main enemy of the Crusaders. On the other side of the Mediterranean, however, the Second Crusade met with great success as a group of northern European Crusaders stopped in Portugal, allied with the Portuguese King Afonso I of Portugal, and retook Lisbon from the Muslims in 1147.

In the Holy Land by 1150, both the kings of France and Germany had returned to their countries without any result. St. Bernard of Clairvaux, who in his preachings had encouraged the Second Crusade, was upset with the amount of misdirected violence and slaughter of the Jewish population of the Rhineland. North Germans and Danes attacked the Wends during the 1147 Wendish Crusade, which was unsuccessful as well.

=== Third Crusade, 1187–1192 ===
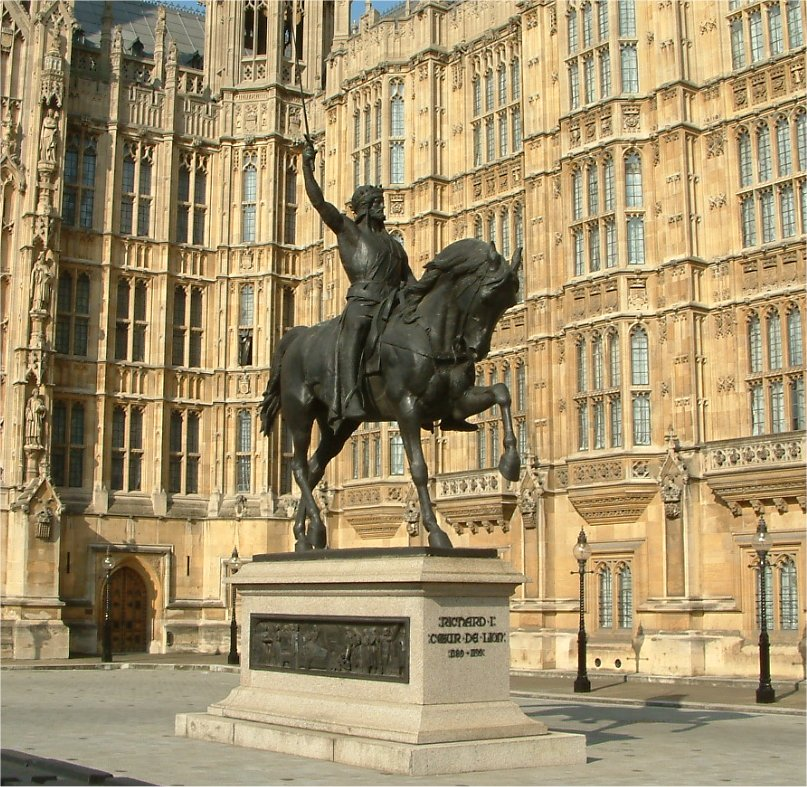
A statue of king Richard I of England (Richard the Lionheart), outside Westminster Palace in London.

In 1187, Saladin, Sultan of Egypt, recaptured Jerusalem, following the Battle of Hattin. After taking Jerusalem back from the Christians, the Muslims spared civilians and for the most part left churches and shrines untouched to be able to collect ransom money from the Franks. Saladin is remembered respectfully in both European and Islamic sources as a man who "always stuck to his promise and was loyal."

The reports of Saladin's victories shocked Europe. Pope Gregory VIII called for a crusade, which was led by several of Europe's most important leaders: Philip II of France, Richard I of England (Richard the Lionheart), and Frederick I, Holy Roman Emperor. Frederick drowned in Cilicia in 1190, leaving an unstable alliance between the English and the French. Before his arrival in the Holy Land, Richard captured the island of Cyprus from the Byzantines in 1191. Cyprus served as a Crusader base for many centuries and remained in Western European hands until the Ottoman Empire conquered the island from Venice in 1571.

After reaching port, Richard the Lionheart promised to leave noncombatants unharmed if the city of Acre surrendered and Saladin returned his Christian prisoners, as well as the true cross and a ransom. However, Saladin, preferring to delay Richard in Acre, refused to honor the surrender agreement of the city's garrison. Therefore, Richard executed Acre's former defenders. From the Frankish point of view, an oath made to a non-Christian was no oath at all. Philip left in 1191, after the Crusaders had recaptured Acre from the Muslims. The Crusader army headed south along the coast of the Mediterranean Sea. They defeated the Muslims near Arsuf, recaptured the port city of Jaffa, and were in sight of Jerusalem. However, Richard did not believe he would be able to hold Jerusalem once it was captured, as the majority of Crusaders would then return to Europe, and the crusade ended without the taking of Jerusalem. Richard left the following year after negotiating a treaty with Saladin. The treaty allowed unarmed Christian pilgrims to make pilgrimages to the Holy Land (Jerusalem), while it remained under Muslim control, as well as ensured the survival of a new Crusader kingdom based around Acre and other Levantine port cities.

On Richard's way home, his ship was wrecked, and he ended up in Austria, where his enemy Duke Leopold captured him. The duke delivered Richard to Emperor Henry VI, who held the king for ransom. By 1197, Henry felt ready for a crusade, but he died in the same year of malaria. Richard I died during fighting in Europe and never returned to the Holy Land. The Third Crusade is sometimes referred to as the Kings' Crusade.

=== Northern Crusades ===
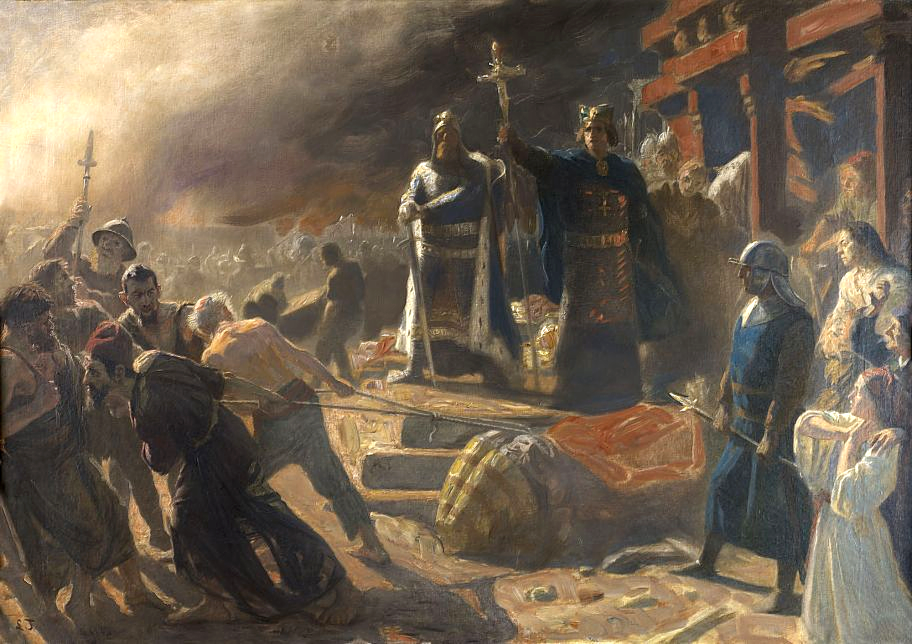
Danish Bishop Absalon destroys the idol of Slavic god Svantevit at Arkona in a painting by Laurits Tuxen

The Northern Crusades or Baltic Crusades were crusades undertaken by the Catholic kings of Denmark and Sweden, the German Livonian and Teutonic military orders, and their allies against the pagan peoples of northern Europe around the southern and eastern shores of the Baltic Sea. Swedish and German campaigns against Russian Eastern Orthodox Christians are also sometimes considered part of the Northern Crusades. Some of these wars were called crusades during the Middle Ages, but others, including most of the Swedish ones, were first dubbed crusades by 19th century romantic nationalist historians.

Contemporaneous with the Second Crusade, Saxons and Danes fought against Polabian Slavs in the 1147 Wendish Crusade. In the 13th century, the Teutonic Knights led Germans, Poles, and Pomeranians against the Old Prussians during the Prussian Crusade.

==== Norwegian Crusade, 1107–1110 ====
Sigurd I of Norway was the first European king who went on a crusade, and his crusader armies defeated Muslims in Spain, the Baleares, and in Palestine where they joined the king of Jerusalem in the Siege of Sidon.

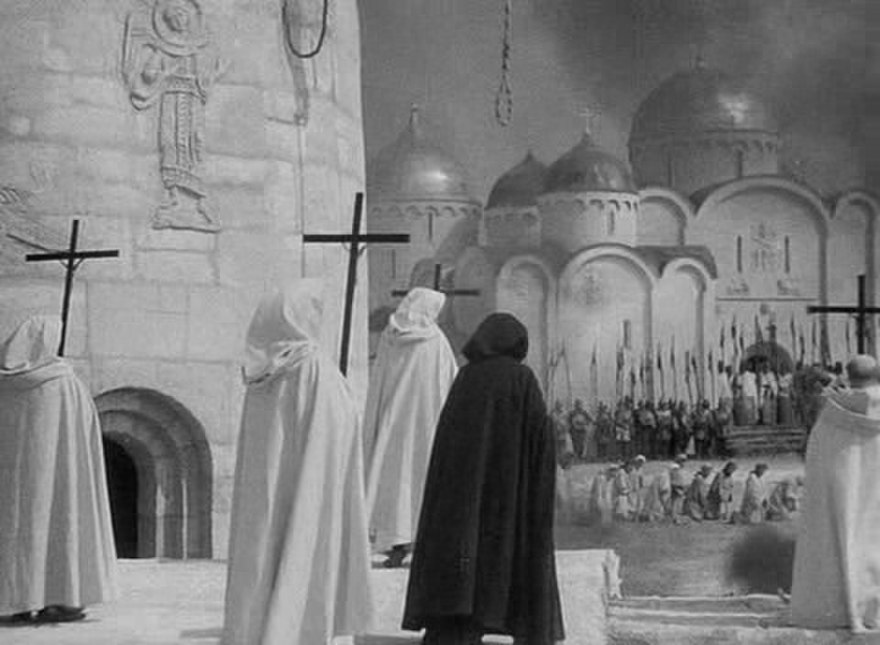
The Teutonic Knights in Pskov in 1240 as depicted in Sergei Eisenstein's Alexander Nevsky (1938).

==== Swedish Crusades ====
The Swedish conquest of Finland in the Middle Ages has traditionally been divided into three "crusades": the First Swedish Crusade around 1155, the Second Swedish Crusade about 1249 and the Third Swedish Crusade in 1293.

The First Swedish Crusade is purely legendary and according to most historians today never took place as described in the legend and did not result in any ties between Finland and Sweden. For the most part, it was made up in the late 13th century to date the Swedish rule in Finland further back in time. No historical record has also survived describing the second one, but it probably did take place and ended up in the concrete conquest of southwestern Finland.

== Orthodox Christianity ==
Orthodox Christian figures of the 12th century included;

- George of Chqondidi, Georgia (d. 1118)
- David IV of Georgia (d. 1125)
- Constantine of Murom, Kievan Rus’ (d. 1129) and his wife Irene
- Anthony of Rome (d. 1149)
- Euphrosyne of Polotsk, Belarus (d. 1167)
- Kirill of Turov, Belarus (d. 1182)
- Andrey Bogolyubsky of Bogolyubovo, Russia (d. 1174)
- Gerasimus of Vologda, Russia (died 1178)
- Maria Shvarnovna of Vladimir, Russia (b. 1158)

== Timeline ==
12th century Timeline
- 1101 Antipope Theodoric and Antipope Adalbert deposed by Pope Paschal II
- 1113 Knights Hospitaller confirmed by Papal bull of Pope Paschal II, listing Blessed Gerard (Gerard Thom) as founder, (a.k.a. Sovereign Order of Saint John of Jerusalem of Rhodes and of Malta, Knights of Malta, Knights of Rhodes, and Chevaliers of Malta)
- 1118 Knights Templar founded, to defend Holy Land
- 1123 Catholic First Lateran Council
- 1124 Conversion of Pomerania - first mission of Otto of Bamberg
- 1128 Holyrood Abbey in Scotland
- 1128 Conversion of Pomerania - second mission of Otto of Bamberg
- 1130 Peter of Bruys, burned at the stake
- 1131 Tintern Abbey in Wales
- 1131-1138 Antipope Anacletus II
- 1139 Catholic Second Lateran Council
- 1140? Decretum Gratiani, Catholic Canon law
- 1142 Peter Abélard, Letters of Abelard and Heloise
- 1144 The Saint Denis Basilica of Abbot Suger is the first major building in the style of Gothic architecture.
- 1154-1159 Pope Adrian IV, first (and to date only) English pope
- 1155 Theotokos of Vladimir arrives to Bogolyubovo
- 1155 Carmelites founded
- 1163 Notre Dame de Paris, construction begun
- 1168 Conversion of Pomerania - Principality of Rugia missioned by Absalon
- 1173 Waldensians founded
- 1179 Catholic Third Lateran Council
- 1191 Teutonic Knights founded
- 1200 - The Bible is now available in 22 different languages

== See also ==
- History of Christianity
- History of the Roman Catholic Church
- History of the Eastern Orthodox Church
- History of Christian theology
- History of Oriental Orthodoxy
- Christianization
- Timeline of Christianity
- Timeline of Christian missions
- Timeline of the Roman Catholic Church
- Chronological list of saints and blesseds in the 12th century

History of Christianity: The Middle Ages
Preceded by: Christianity in the 11th century / 12th century / Followed by: Christianity in the 13th century
| BC | C1 | C2 | C3 | C4 | C5 | C6 | C7 | C8 | C9 | C10 |
| C11 | C12 | C13 | C14 | C15 | C16 | C17 | C18 | C19 | C20 | C21 |
