= Christianity in the 7th century =

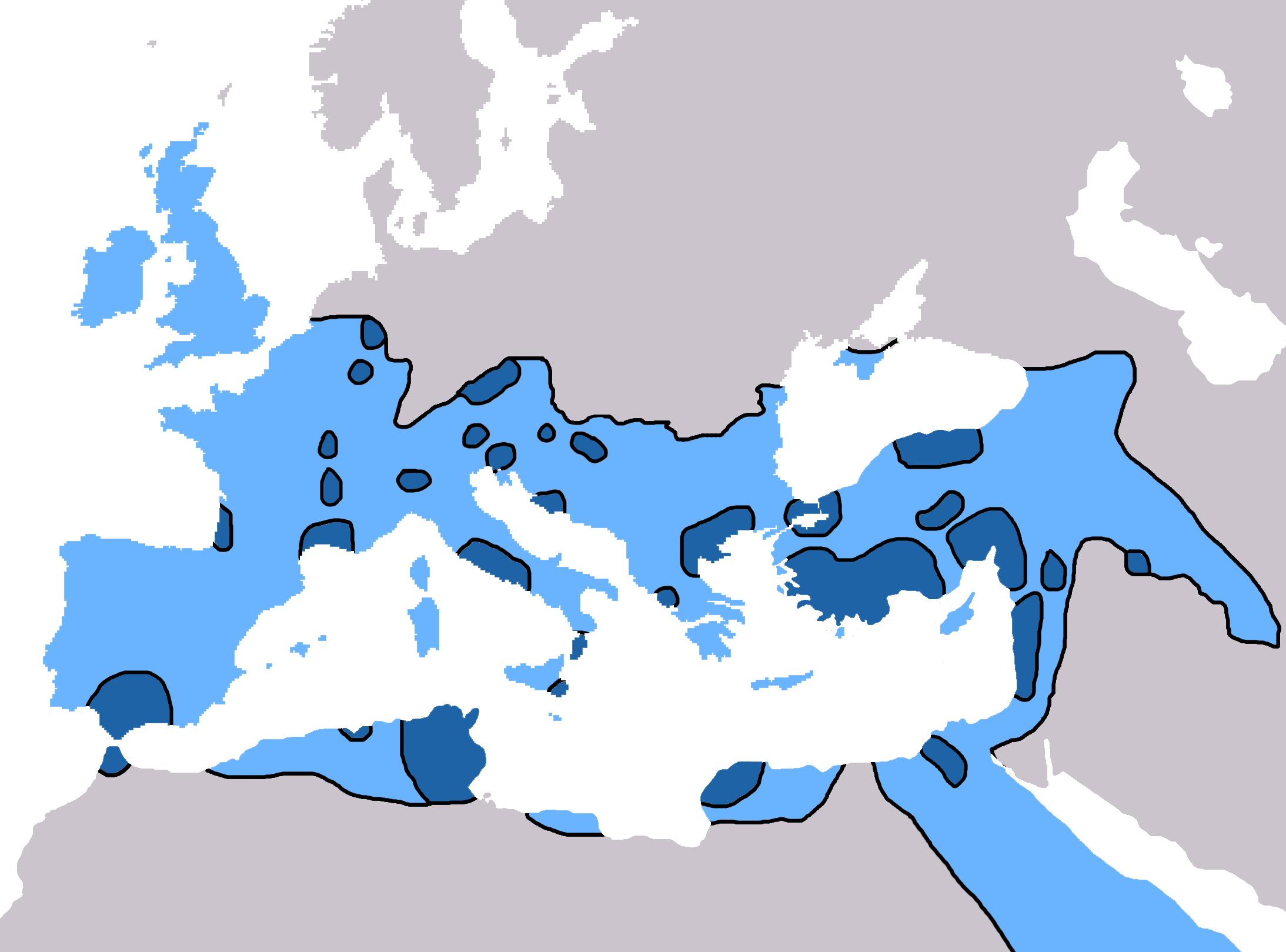
Spread of Christianity to 325 Spread of Christianity to 600

The Western (Latin) and Eastern (Greek) divisions of Christianity began to take on distinctive shape in 7th-century Christianity. Whereas in the East the Church maintained its structure and character and evolved more slowly, in the West the Bishops of Rome (the popes) were forced to adapt more quickly and flexibly to drastically changing circumstances. In particular, whereas the bishops of the East maintained clear allegiance to the Eastern Roman emperor, the Bishop of Rome, while maintaining nominal allegiance to the Eastern emperor, was forced to negotiate delicate balances with the "barbarian rulers" of the former Western provinces. Although the greater number of Christians remained in the East, the developments in the West would set the stage for major developments in the Christian world during the later Middle Ages.

During the 7th century an Arabian religious leader named Muhammad began to spread an Abrahamic faith, similar to that of Christianity and Judaism, which would become one of the greatest challenges to the medieval Christian Church. Large portions of the Arabian Peninsula had been conquered by the time of his death, and the emerging caliphate would soon begin expanding beyond Arabia as the Byzantine and Persian empires had just been crippled during the Byzantine–Sasanian War of 602–628.

== Ecumenical Councils ==
=== Third Council of Constantinople ===
The Third Council of Constantinople (680–681): repudiated monothelitism and affirmed that Christ had both human and divine wills. It is considered one of the first seven ecumenical councils

=== Quinisext Council ===
The Quinisext Council or Council in Trullo (692) has not been accepted by the Roman Catholic Church. Since it was mostly an administrative council for raising some local canons to ecumenical status, establishing principles of clerical discipline, addressing the Biblical canon, and establishing the pentarchy, without determining matters of doctrine, the Eastern Orthodox Church does not consider it to be a full-fledged council in its own right; instead it is considered to be an extension of the fifth and sixth councils.

== Western theology ==
When the Western Roman Empire fragmented under the impact of various barbarian invasions, the empire-wide intellectual culture that had underpinned late patristic theology had its interconnections cut. Theology tended to become more localised, more diverse, more fragmented. The classic Christianity preserved in Italy by men like Boethius and Cassiodorus was different from the vigorous Frankish Christianity documented by Gregory of Tours, which was different from the Christianity that flourished in Ireland and Northumbria in the 7th and 8th centuries. Throughout this period, theology tended to be a more monastic affair, flourishing in monastic havens where the conditions and resources for theological learning could be maintained.

Important writers include:

- Isidore of Seville (c.560-636)
- Bede (672-736)

== Monasticism ==
=== Western ===
Wealthy lords and nobles would give the monasteries estates in exchange for the conduction of masses for the soul of a deceased loved one. Though this was likely not the original intent of Benedict of Nursia, the efficiency of his cenobitic rule in addition to the stability of the monasteries made such estates very productive; the general monk was essentially raised to a level of nobility; for the serfs of the estate would tend to the labor while the monk was free to study. The monasteries thus attracted many of the best people in society, and during this period the monasteries were the central storehouses and producers of knowledge.

=== Eastern ===
Of great importance to the development of monasticism is the Saint Catherine's Monastery on Mount Sinai. The Ladder of Divine Ascent was written there by John Climacus (c.600), a work of such importance that many Orthodox monasteries to this day read it publicly either during the Divine Services or in Trapeza during Great Lent.

At the height of the Byzantine Empire, numerous great monasteries were established by the emperors, including the twenty "sovereign monasteries" on Mount Athos, an actual "monastic republic" wherein the entire country is devoted to bringing souls closer to God. In this milieu, the Philokalia was compiled.

== Spread of Christianity ==
=== England ===
Christianization of Anglo-Saxon England began around 600, influenced by the Gregorian mission from the southeast and the Hiberno-Scottish mission from the northwest. Augustine, the first Archbishop of Canterbury, took office in 597. Arwald, the last pagan Anglo-Saxon king, was killed in 686.

=== Germanic peoples ===
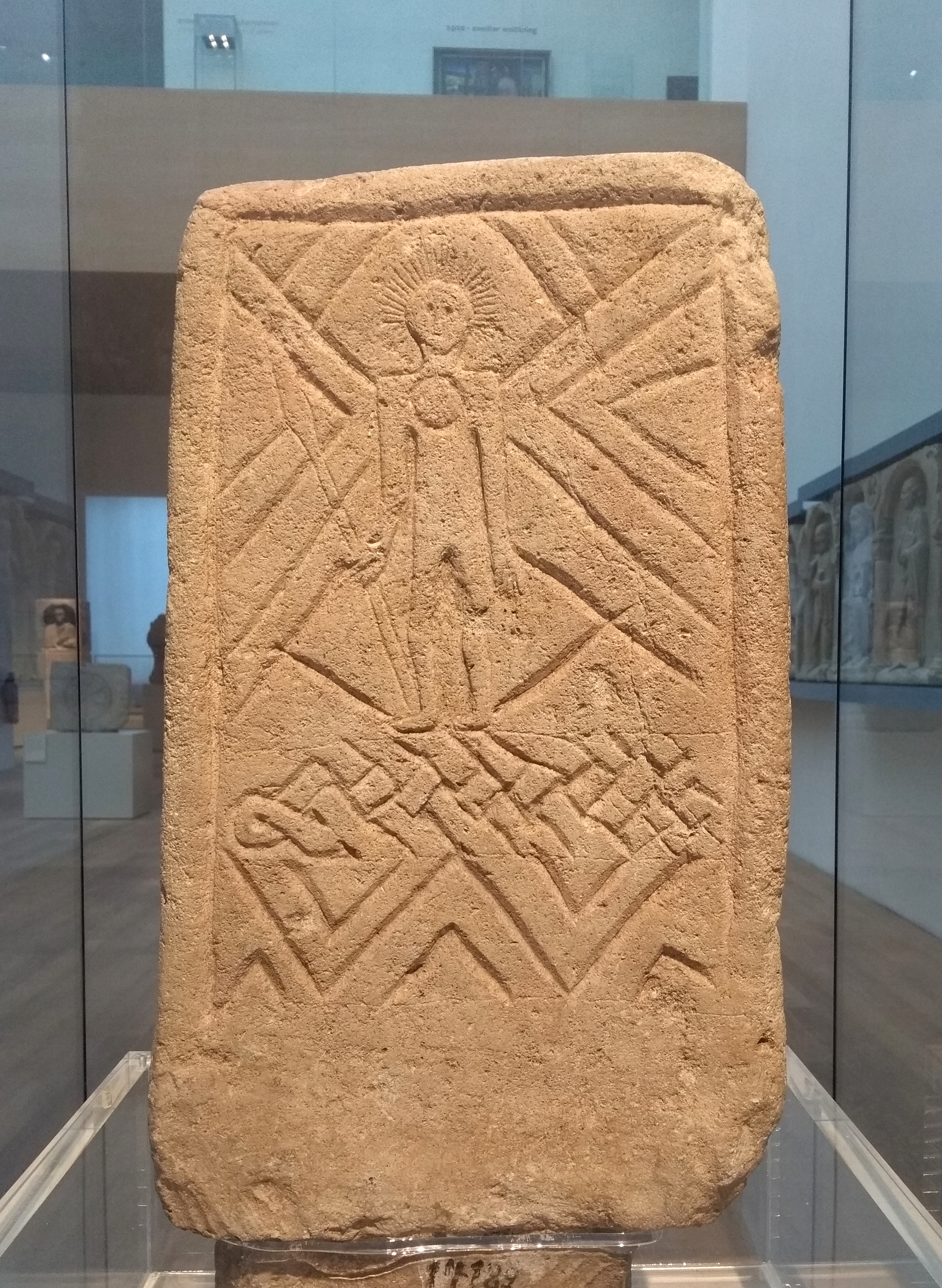
7th-century Frankish depiction of Jesus on the Niederdollendorf stone in Germany.

Colombanus, Boniface, Willibrord, and others took Christianity into northern Europe and spread Catholicism among the Germanic and Slavic peoples. The Synod of Whitby of 664, though not as decisive as sometimes claimed, was an important moment in the reintegration of the Celtic Church of the British Isles into the Roman hierarchy, after having been effectively cut from contact with Rome by the pagan invaders.

The Alamanni became Christians after a period of syncretism during the 7th century, by gradual emulation of the new religion of the Merovingian elite.

Christian missionaries to the Anglo-Saxons include:

- Augustine of Canterbury
- Laurence of Canterbury
- Mellitus
- Justus
- Chad of Mercia
- Saint Honorius
- Aidan of Lindisfarne
- Saint Trudpert (Irish, 7th century)
- Saint Rumbold

=== China ===
When Christianity was first introduced to China, three major religious systems, Buddhism, Confucianism, and Taoism, were already popular there, woven into the ancient traditions and customs of the people. The average Chinese did not regard himself as an exclusive adherent of any one of the three but rather as a follower of a general Chinese religion made up of both animistic and polytheistic elements which represented a syncretistic conglomeration of ideas. Thus the Christian church with its divisive and exclusionist policies had some difficulties. Only in the periods of the Tang (618-906) and Yuan (1206–1368) dynasties did the gospel enterprise have any considerable degree of success. The ancient Breviary of the Syrian church of Malabar written during 17th century states that "By the means of St. Thomas the Chinese...were converted to the truth...By means of St. Thomas the kingdom of heaven flew and entered into China...The Chinese in commemoration of St. Thomas do offer their adoration unto Thy most Holy Name, O God."

Active trade for centuries between China and the West could have brought Christian missionaries at an early date. But aside from one rather obscure reference in the Adversus Gentes by Arnobius (303) to "the Chinese as among those united in the faith of Christ, there is little or no evidence of Christians in China before the 7th century. But from then on the evidence of Christianity in China during the Tang Era (618-906) are numerous, including references in Chinese writings, imperial edicts, and in particular the famous inscriptions on the so-called "Nestorian Monument". During the Tang dynasty conditions were favorable for the introduction of foreign faiths: the lines of international communication were wide open; foreign trade flourished; the government was tolerant toward all faiths; all foreigners were welcome in various capacities. It was in the Tang dynasty that Christianity first came to be known as the "Luminous Religion" (Jǐng Jiào, 景教).

Following this is an account of how Alopen of Daqin (Daqin meaning the Near East, especially Syria or Persia) arrived in Chang'an in 635 bearing the Scriptures. He was welcomed by Emperor Gaozu, the founder of the Tang dynasty. The emperor, having examined the sacred writings, ordered their translation and the preaching of their message. He also directed the building of a Christian monastery in his capital. According to the inscription, his successor, Emperor Taizong, also encouraged Christianity and ordered the building of a monastery in each province of his domain.

The second part of the monument was written in Syriac and listed some sixty-seven names: one bishop, twenty-eight presbyters, and thirty-eight monks. Some of these have been verified from Assyrian church records. The inscription displays considerable grace of literary style, and the allusions and phraseology reveal competence in both Chinese and Syriac and familiarity with both Buddhism and Taoism. Ancient Christian manuscripts were also discovered at Dunhuang from about the same period and are written in the literary style of the Monument. These include a "Hymn to the Trinity" and refer to at least thirty Christian books, indicating that considerable Christian literature was in circulation.

The 250-year span of the Christian movement in the Tang period was characterized by vicissitudes of imperial favor and prosperity, persecution and decline. Christianity fared badly during the reign of Wu Zetian (689-699), who was an ardent Buddhist. However, several succeeding emperors were favorable, and the missionary forces were reinforced from time to time.

=== Northeast Asia ===
The trade routes of the Silk Road are also known to have reached Korea, Japan, and what is today eastern Russia by this time, contributing to these exchanges. Against this background it is from China, in particular from Chang-an during the Tang dynasty, that Christianity also first came to Korea and Japan. In the case of Korea, where Christianity seems to have been present, evidence has been found in the Korean Chronicles Sanguk Yusa and Sanguksa, for the presence of Nestorian Christianity during the Northern and Southern States period (698–926). This is not unexpected in the light of the known presence of Koreans at the tang capital, Chang-an, in the 7th to 9th centuries.

=== Middle East ===
The Muslim presence in the Holy Land began with the initial Muslim conquest of Syria in the 7th century. The Muslim armies' successes put increasing pressure on the Eastern Orthodox Byzantine Empire.

Early Muslim conquest of these lands in the 7th and 8th centuries did not introduce direct persecution. However, Muslim apostasy was curbed by threat of death, and many nominal Christians began to gradually defect to Islam to avoid discrimination and the 1 dinar per year jizya. Christians were still allowed to maintain churches and preach the Gospel in private sermons.

In 644, Abdisho had succeeded in drawing a large number of Turks, beyond the Oxus River, into the Church of the East. Colleges were established in Merv, and a monastery was founded there in the 8th century.

In fact, so successful were the missionary efforts that it appeared that Christianity might become the dominant faith in the whole region between the Caspian Sea and Xinjiang in northwest China. The largely animistic and polytheistic religions there offered little or no effective resistance to the higher faith. Moreover, Islam at first made little headway in that area, and the dualistic faith of Manichaeism also had scant appeal.

Christian Turks visiting Ctesiphon in connection with the election of a new metropolitan about this time were described as people of clean habits and orthodox beliefs and as readers of the Scriptures in both Syriac and their own language.

== Byzantine and Muslim conflict ==
=== The Roman-Persian Wars ===
Lasting from 92 BC to 627 AD, the conflict between the Persian and Roman Empires was a protracted struggle which was arguably a continuation of the Greco-Persian Wars. The Roman-Persian Wars led to weakening of the neighboring Arab states to the South and East of the Eastern Roman Empire. The conflict so drained both the Persian and Byzantine empires that once the conquests of Muhammad started, neither could mount an effective defense against the onslaught. Persia fell to the Muslims.

=== Byzantine-Arab Wars ===
Age of the Caliphs Expansion under Muhammad, 622–632 Expansion during the Rashidun Caliphate, 632–661 Expansion during the Umayyad Caliphate, 661–750

Following the death of Muhammad in 632, there was a vigorous push by the Arab Muslims to conquer Arab tribes of the East such as the mostly Christian Ghassanids. The Byzantine-Muslim Wars were a series of wars between the Arab Muslims Caliphates and the Eastern Orthodox Byzantine Empire. These started during the initial Muslim conquests under the Rashidun and Umayyad caliphs and continued in the form of an enduring border tussle until the beginning of the Crusades. As a result, the Byzantines saw an extensive loss of territory.

The initial conflict lasted from 629 to 717, ending with the Second Arab Siege of Constantinople that halted the rapid expansion of the Arab Muslim Empire or Umayyad dynasty into Asia Minor.

After the Arab conquest of North Africa in the 7th century the Eastern Orthodox Church of Egypt in Alexandria were a minority even among Christians and remained small for centuries.

== Timeline ==
Timeline of Christianity in the 7th century
- 604 St Paul's Cathedral in London
- 604 - A church is reportedly planted on Thorney Island (where Westminster Abbey now stands)
- 609 Pantheon, Rome renamed Church of Santa Maria Rotonda
- 612? Bobbio monastery in northern Italy
- 613 Abbey of St. Gall in Switzerland
- 614 Khosrau II of Persia conquered Damascus, Jerusalem, took Holy Cross of Christ
- 625 Paulinus of York comes to convert Northumbria
- 627 - Conversion of King Edwin of Northumbria
- 628 Babai the Great, pillar of Assyrian Church of the East, died
- 628-629 Battle of Mut'ah, Heraclius recovered Cross of Christ and Jerusalem from the Persians until 638
- 629 - Amandus of Elnon is consecrated a missionary bishop. He evangelized the region around Ghent and went on missions to Slavs along the Danube and to Basques in Navarre
- 632 Eorpwald of East Anglia baptized under influence of Edwin of Northumbria
- 630 - Conversion of the East Angles (one of the seven kingdoms of the Anglo-Saxon Heptarchy)
- 635 - First Christian missionaries (Nestorian monks, including Alopen, from Asia Minor and Persia arrive in China; Aidan of Lindisfarne begins evangelizing in the heart of Northumbria (England)
- 635 Cynegils of Wessex baptized by Bishop Birinus
- 637 - the Lombards, a Germanic people living in northern Italy, become Christians
- 638 - A church building is erected in Ch'ang-an, then perhaps the largest city in the world (see Daqin Pagoda)
- 647 - Amadeus, bishop of Maastricht, carries out missionary work in Frisia (Netherlands) and among the Slavs
- 650 - First church organized in Netherlands
- 664 Synod of Whitby unites Celtic Christianity of British Isles with Roman Catholicism
- 680-681 Third Council of Constantinople, 6th ecumenical, against Monothelites, condemned Pope Honorius I, Patriarch Sergius I of Constantinople, Heraclius' Ecthesis
- 681-686 Wilfrid converts Sussex
- 687-691 Dome of the Rock built
- 673 - Irish monk Maol Rubha founds a training center at Aprochrosan that would serve as a base for missionary outreach into Scotland
- 680 - First translation of Christian Scriptures into Arabic
- 687 - Conversion of Sussex
- 689 - Pagans kill Irish missionary Kilian near Würzburg in what is now Germany. His remains will be buried in a Benedictine abbey in Würzburg.
- 690? Old English Bible translations
- 692 Orthodox Quinisext Council, convoked by Justinian II, approved Canons of the Apostles of Apostolic Constitutions, Clerical celibacy, rejected by Pope Constantine
- 692 - Willibrord and 11 companions cross the North Sea to become missionaries to the Frisians (modern day Netherlands)

== See also ==
- Christian monasticism
- Christianization
- Chronological list of saints in the 7th century
- Church Fathers
- Development of the New Testament canon
- History of Calvinist-Arminian debate
- History of Christian theology
- History of Christianity
- History of Oriental Orthodoxy
- History of the Eastern Orthodox Church
- History of the Roman Catholic Church
- List of Church Fathers
- Patristics
- Timeline of Christian missions
- Timeline of Christianity
- Timeline of the Roman Catholic Church

== Notes and references ==
History of Christianity: The Middle Ages
Preceded by: Christianity in the 6th century / 7th century / Followed by: Christianity in the 8th century
BC	C1	C2	C3	C4	C5	C6	C7	C8	C9	C10
C11	C12	C13	C14	C15	C16	C17	C18	C19	C20	C21
