= Bogolyubovo =

Bogolyubovo (Russian: Боголюбово, translated as "God-loving") is the name of several rural localities in Russia:

- Bogolyubovo, Perm Krai, a village in Kochyovsky District of Perm Krai
- Bogolyubovo, Smolensk Oblast, a selo in Bogdanovskoye Rural Settlement of Kholm-Zhirkovsky District in Smolensk Oblast
- Bogolyubovo, Petrovsky District, Tambov Oblast, a village in Pervomaysky Selsoviet of Petrovsky District in Tambov Oblast
- Bogolyubovo, Staroyuryevsky District, Tambov Oblast, a selo in Novikovsky Selsoviet of Staroyuryevsky District in Tambov Oblast
- Bogolyubovo, Vladimir Oblast, a settlement in Suzdalsky District of Vladimir Oblast

There is also an Eastern Orthodox icon Theotokos of Bogolyubovo.
