= Bogolyubovo, Perm Krai =

Bogolyubovo Боголюбово
- Village
- Location within Perm Krai Location within Russia
- Coordinates: 59°29′N 54°24′E
- Country: Russia
- Region: Perm Krai
- District: Kochyovsky District
- Time zone: UTC+5:00

Bogolyubovo (Russian: Боголюбово) is a rural locality (a village) in Kochyovskoye Rural Settlement, Kochyovsky District, Perm Krai, Russia. The population was 1 as of 2010. There is 1 street.

== Geography ==
Bogolyubovo is located 30 km southeast of Kochyovo (the district's administrative centre) by road. Salnikovo is the nearest rural locality.
