= Würzburg Abbey =

Würzburg Abbey may refer to:

- St. Burchard's Abbey, Würzburg
- St. Kilian's Abbey, Würzburg
- St. James's Abbey, Würzburg
- St. Stephen's Abbey, Würzburg
