= Gerasimus of Vologda =

Russian Orthodox saint (died 1178)

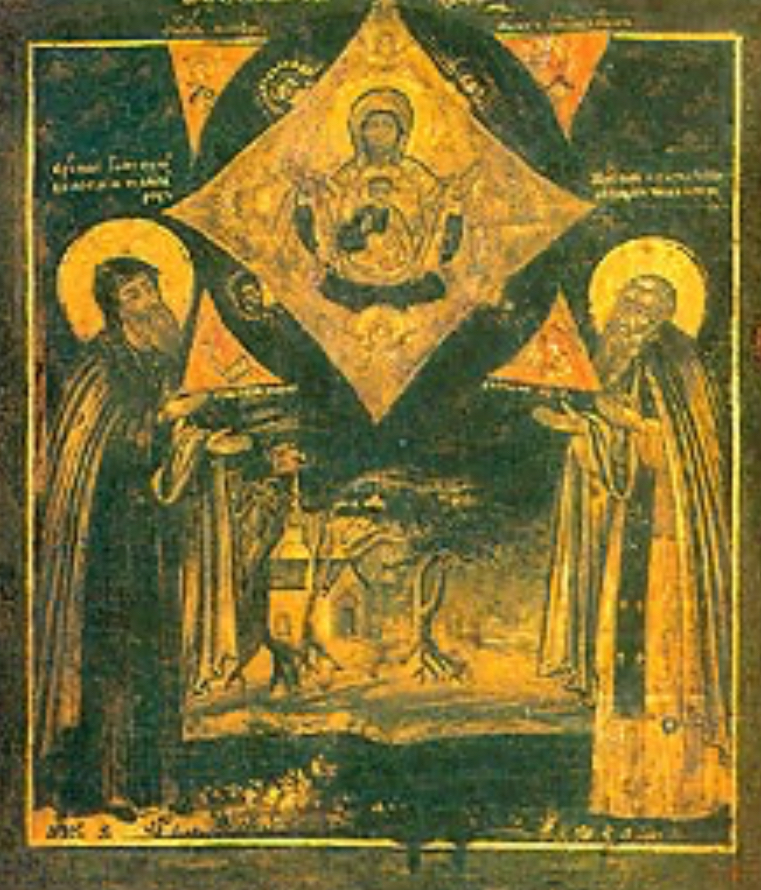
An icon of Saint Gerasmus of Vologda, and Saint Gerasmus of the Jordan, his namesake, standing before the Theotokos (Virgin Mary).

Gerasimus of Vologda was the first wonderworker in the city of Vologda, Russia He is canonised by the Russian Orthodox Church, his feast day is celebrated on March 4. It is celebrated on March 4th because on that day Gerasimus took up monastic tonsure, with his religious name being, Gerasimus, after the great Saint, Saint Gerasimus of the Jordan.

Gerasimus was attracted to the Gniloe Dormition monastery in Kiev. He was attracted to the monastery and caves as that is where Saint Theodosius spent Great Lent in hesychasm. Eventually, Hersamus moved to the north of Russia, on the banks of the River Vologda, on August 19, 1147. In the North, he found a small settlement, and he blessed and foretold that this settlement would become a bustling city. This “blessing” worked, as this settlement would later become, Vologda. Gerasimus choose to flee the settlement, and practice hesychasm, in the dense forest, near Kaisarova creek. There he build a church in honour of the Trinity. It was also considered a monastery, so it was considered the first monastery in the North, to be built in honour of the Trinity. This monastery served as a place of spiritual enlightenment amongst the people.

He died at his monastery in March 4, 1178, the same day of his monastic tonsure and his namesake's feast day.
