= Pajić =

Pajić (Serbian, Croatian) or Pajič (Slovene) is a surname, a patronymic of Pajo or Paja. Notable people with the surname include:

- Dejan Pajić (born 1989), Serbian sprint canoer
- Ksenija Pajić (born 1961), Croatian actress
- Marko Pajić (born 1992), Slovenian basketball player
- Murajica Pajič (born 1961), Slovenian ice hockey player
- Nancy Wilson-Pajic (born 1941) American visual artist
- Predrag Pajić (born 1993), Macedonian basketball player
- Rok Pajič (born 1985), Slovenian ice hockey player
- Sladjan Pajić (born 1992), Austrian-Serbian footballer
- Slobodan Pajic (born 1943), visual artist
- Slobodan Pajić (born 1990), Serbian Missile Scientist
