= Pavle, Archbishop of Peć =

Pavle, Archbishop of Peć may refer to:

- Pavle I, Archbishop of Peć, eastern-orthodox Archbishop of Peć and self-proclaimed Serbian Patriarch c. 1527 – 1541
- Pavle II, Archbishop of Peć, eastern-orthodox Archbishop of Peć and Serbian Patriarch from 1990 to 2009

== See also ==
- Pavle (disambiguation)
- Archbishop Pavle (disambiguation)
- List of heads of the Serbian Orthodox Church
