= Pavic =

Pavic may refer to:

- Pavić, a South Slavic surname found in Croatia and Serbia
- Pavič, a South Slavic surname found in Slovenia
