= Archbishop Pavle =

Archbishop Pavle may refer to:

- Pavle of Smederevo, Archbishop of Peć and self-proclaimed Serbian Patriarch c. 1527 – 1541
- Pavle Nenadović, Serbian Orthodox Archbishop of Karlovci, from 1749 to 1768
- Pavle, Serbian Patriarch, Archbishop of Peć and Serbian Patriarch from 1990 to 2009

== See also ==
- Pavle (disambiguation)
- Patriarch Pavle (disambiguation)
- List of heads of the Serbian Orthodox Church
