= Pavić =

Pavić (pronounced [pǎːʋitɕ]) is a South Slavic surname, common in Croatia and Serbia. It is derived from the personal name Pavao/Pavo (related to English Paul), by means of patronymic-forming suffix -ić.

The surname is among the most common surnames in two counties of Croatia.

Notable people with the name include:

- Ante Pavić (born 1989), Croatian tennis player
- Antonio Pavić (born 1994), Croatian footballer
- Armin Pavić (1844–1914), Croatian literary historian and politician
- Boris Pavić (born 1973), Croatian football manager and former player
- Josip Pavić (born 1982), Croatian water polo player
- Jure Pavić (born 1975), Croatian footballer
- Lazar Pavić (born 1994), Serbian footballer
- Markus Pavić (born 1995), Austrian footballer
- Martina Pavić (born 1988), Croatian handball player
- Mate Pavić (born 1993), Croatian tennis player
- Milan Pavić (1914–1986), Croatian photographer
- Milorad Pavić (writer) (1929–2009), Serbian writer
- Milorad Pavić (footballer) (1921–2005), Serbian football coach
- Nikola Pavić (1898–1976), Croatian writer
- Ninoslav Pavić, Croatian entrepreneur
- Siniša Pavić (1933–2024), Serbian writer
- Vlasta Pavić (born 1955), Croatian politician
- Vukota Pavić (born 1993), Montenegrin basketball player

== See also ==
- Pavič
