= Pavo (given name) =

Pavo is a Croatian masculine given name, cognate to Paul.

It may refer to:

- Pavo Barišić (born 1959), Croatian philosopher and politician
- Pavo Crnac (born 1971), Croatian football player
- Pavo Dadić (born 1969), Bosnian Croat football player
- Pavo Grgic, German parathlete
- Pavo Marković (born 1985), Croatian water polo player
- Pavo Raudsepp (born 1973), Estonian cross-country skier
- Pavo Urban (1968–1991), Croatian photographer

== See also ==
- Paavo
- Pavao (given name)
- Pavel
- Pavle
- Pajo (given name)
