= FON University =

University in Skopje, North Macedonia

American University of Europe - FON
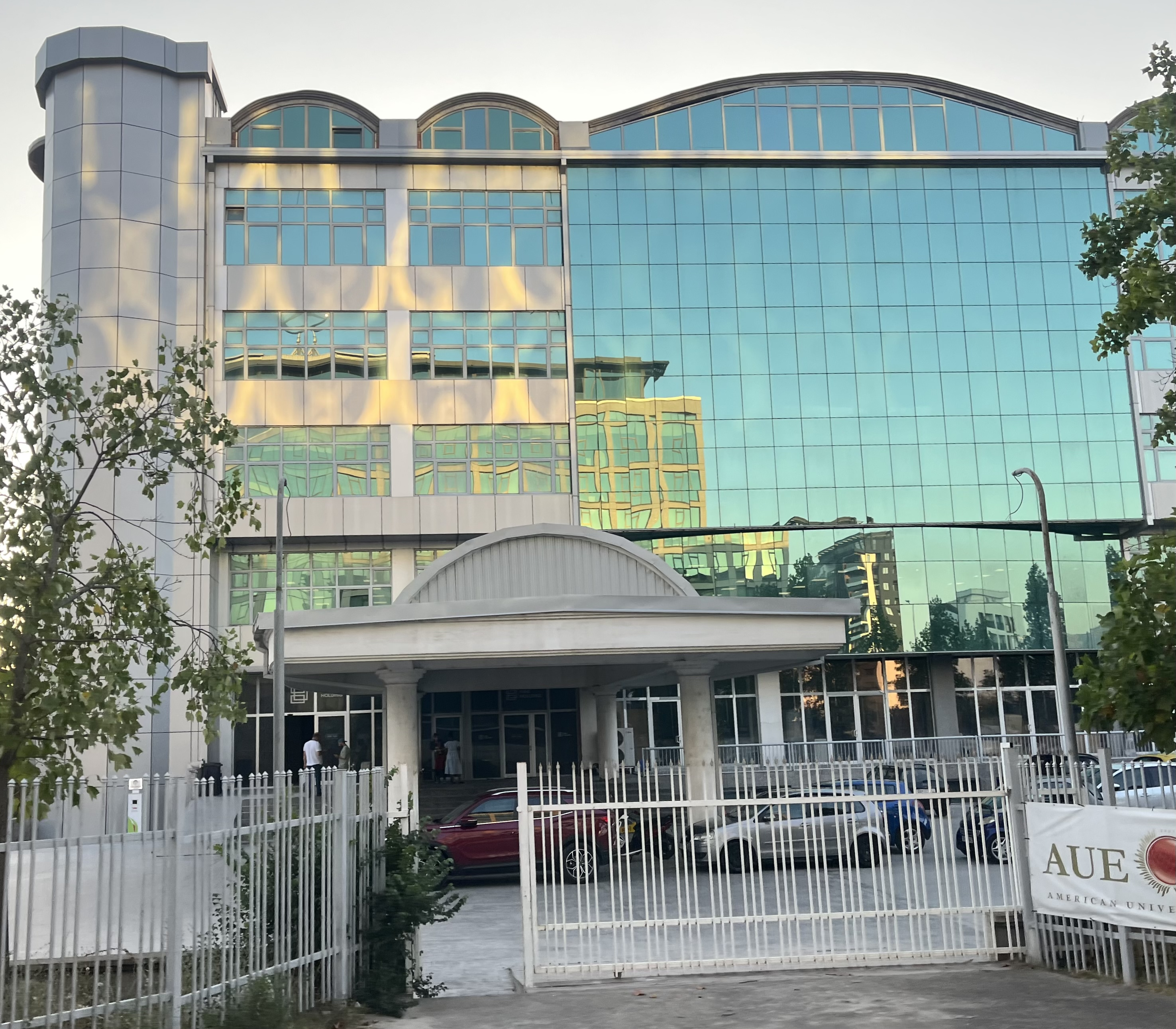
- AUE-FON University Building
- Former name: FON University
- Type: Private
- Established: 2003; 23 years ago
- Founder: Fijat Canoski
- Accreditation: Agency for Quality of Higher Education, Republic of North Macedonia
- President: Sefer Canoski
- Rector: Savo Ashtalkoski, PhD
- Faculty: 170
- Administrative staff: 90
- Students: 863 (2018–19)
- Location: Skopje and Struga, North Macedonia; 41°59′35″N 21°28′28″E
- Campus: Urban
- Website: aue.mk

The American University of Europe-FON, or AUE-FON University is a private university with headquarters in Skopje, North Macedonia. Established in 2003, it is one of the first private universities in North Macedonia. The University received accreditation after the 2002 changes to the Higher Education Law, which liberalized the establishment of higher education institutions.

In 2020, the university changed its name from FON University to American University of Europe - FON (AEU-FON).

== History ==
The University is an autonomous, private, non-profit, scientific, and higher education institution, established in the year of 2003 as a Faculty of Social Sciences. The founder of the first private university in the country is Mr. Fijat Canoski, MA. In 2007, with the introduction of new academic areas, the institution became the First Private University-FON. As a result of the significant growth in its development and the great interest for education, apart from Skopje, AUE - FON opens three dispensary departments in Strumica, Gostivar and Struga. Still functioning to this day is the dispensary department in Struga.

Following the world trends in higher education in order to adapt to the interest, needs and requirements of students, in 2020 the university rebranded and renamed itself into the American University of Europe - FON.

== Faculties ==
The University has 5 faculties:

- Faculty of Law and Political Science
- Faculty of Economics
- Faculty for Detectives and Security
- Faculty of Information and Communication Technology
- Faculty of Design and Multimedia

== Notable alumni ==
- Besar Durmishi, minister of Economy and Labor, Government of North Macedonia
- Dragan Pavlović Latas, Macedonian journalist
- George Gruevski, Chief Operating Officer of LEORON Institute
- Goce Georgievski, Macedonian professional handball player
- Marija Petrushevska, Macedonian member of parliament
- Mevmed Xhemajloski, Macedonian member of parliament
- Monika Zajkova, Macedonian member of parliament
- Pavle Sazdov, Macedonian former politician
- Robertina Mečevska, Macedonian former professional handball player
- Shaban Saliu, minister without portfolio, Government of North Macedonia
- Viktorija Trajkov, deputy minister of European affairs, Government of North Macedonia

== See also ==
- Balkan Universities Network
- List of universities in North Macedonia
- Skopje
