= Pavle =

Pavle (Macedonian and Serbian Cyrillic: Павле; Georgian: პავლე) is a Serbian, Macedonian, Croatian and Georgian male given name corresponding to the English Paul; the name is of biblical origin, coming from Saint Paul.

== People ==
=== Mononyms ===
- Pavle I, Archbishop of Peć (c. 1526–1541), Serbian Orthodox bishop
- Pavle, Serbian Patriarch (died 2009) (1914–2009), Serbian Orthodox Patriarch

=== By surname ===
- Pavle Abramidze (1901–1989), Georgian Soviet general
- Pavle Dešpalj (1934–2021), Croatian composer and conductor
- Pavle Đurišić (1909–1945), Montenegrin Serb Chetnik army commander
- Pavle Gregorić (1892–1989), Croatian communist politician
- Pavle Ingorokva (1893–1983), Georgian historian
- Pavle Ivić (1924–1999), Serbian linguist
- Pavle "Paja" Jovanović (1859–1957), Serbian painter
- Pavle Jurina (1954–2011), Croatian handball player
- Pavle Kalinić (born 1959), Croatian politician and writer
- Pavle Karađorđević (1893–1976), Prince regent of Yugoslavia
- Pavle Nenadović (1703–1768), Serbian Orthodox bishop
- Pavle Orlović, 14th-century Serbian nobleman
- Pavle Papić (1919–2005), Croatian mathematician
- Pavle Popović (1868–1939), Serbian literary critic and historian
- Pavle Radenović (1391–1415), Bosnian nobleman
- Pavle Radić (1880–1928), Croatian politician
- Pavle Savić (1909–1994), Serbian physicist and chemist
- Pavle Sazdov (born 1983), Macedonian politician
- Pavle Simić (1818–1876), Serbian painter
- Pavle Vuisić (1926–1988), Yugoslav actor

== See also ==
- Paulus (disambiguation)
- Pavao (given name)
- Pavo (given name)
- Paja (given name)
- Pajo (given name)
- Pavel, another Slavic form of the name
