= Pavle Papić =

Pavle Papić (1919, Antofagasta – 2005, Zagreb) was a Croatian mathematician.

Papić graduated mathematics from the University of Zagreb where in 1953 he received his doctorate degree in mathematics under the supervision of Đuro Kurepa. From 1966 until 1968 he was a dean of Faculty of Natural Sciences and Mathematics at the University of Zagreb, from 1968 until 1974 a director of Institute of Mathematics in Zagreb. Since 1977 he was a corresponding member of the Yugoslav Academy of Arts and Sciences and since 1994 a corresponding member of the Croatian Academy of Arts and Sciences.

His interests were in set theory and general topology. He found necessary and sufficient conditions for metrizability and orderability of pseudometric and ultrametric spaces.
