= Pavič =

Pavič is a South Slavic surname found largely in Slovenia. Notable people with the name include:

- Jozo Pavič (born 1969), Croatian football player
- Smiljan Pavič (born 1980), Slovenian basketball player

== See also ==
- Pavić
