= Pavao (given name) =

Pavao is a Croatian masculine given name, cognate to Paul.

It may refer to:

- Pavao Anđelić (1920–1985), Bosnian archaeologist and historian
- Pavao Dragičević (1694–1773), Bosnian Franciscan friar and bishop
- Pavao Ljubičić (1918–1944), Croatian rower
- Pavao Löw (1910–1986), Yugoslav Jewish football player
- Pavao Martić (born 1940), Croatian rower
- Pavao Mašić (born 1980), Croatian harpsichordist and organist
- Pavao Miljavac (1953–2022), Croatian general
- Pavao Muhić (1811–1897), Croatian lawyer and politician
- Pavao Pavličić (born 1946), Croatian writer
- Pavao Pervan (born 1987), Austrian football player of Bosnian Croat origin
- Pavao Pintarić (1913–1990), Yugoslav fencer
- Pavao Posilović (1597–1657), Croatian Catholic bishop
- Pavao Rajzner (1942–2015), Croatian football player and manager
- Pavao Rauch (1865–1933), Croatian politician
- Pavao Ritter Vitezović (1652–1713), Habsburg-Croatian polymath
- Pavao Tijan (1908–1997), Croatian encyclopaedist
- Pavao Zorčić (c.1620–1685), Croatian Greek Catholic hierarch
- Pavao Špirančić (c. 1400–1463), Croatian nobleman
- Pavao Štalter (1929–2021), Croatian animator
- Pavao Štoos (1806–1862), Croatian poet and priest
- Pavao Šubić (c. 1245–1312), Croatian nobleman
- Pavao Žanić (1918–2000), Croatian Catholic bishop

== See also ==
- Pavo (given name)
- Pajo (given name)
- Pavle
- Pavel
