= Nancy Wilson-Pajic =

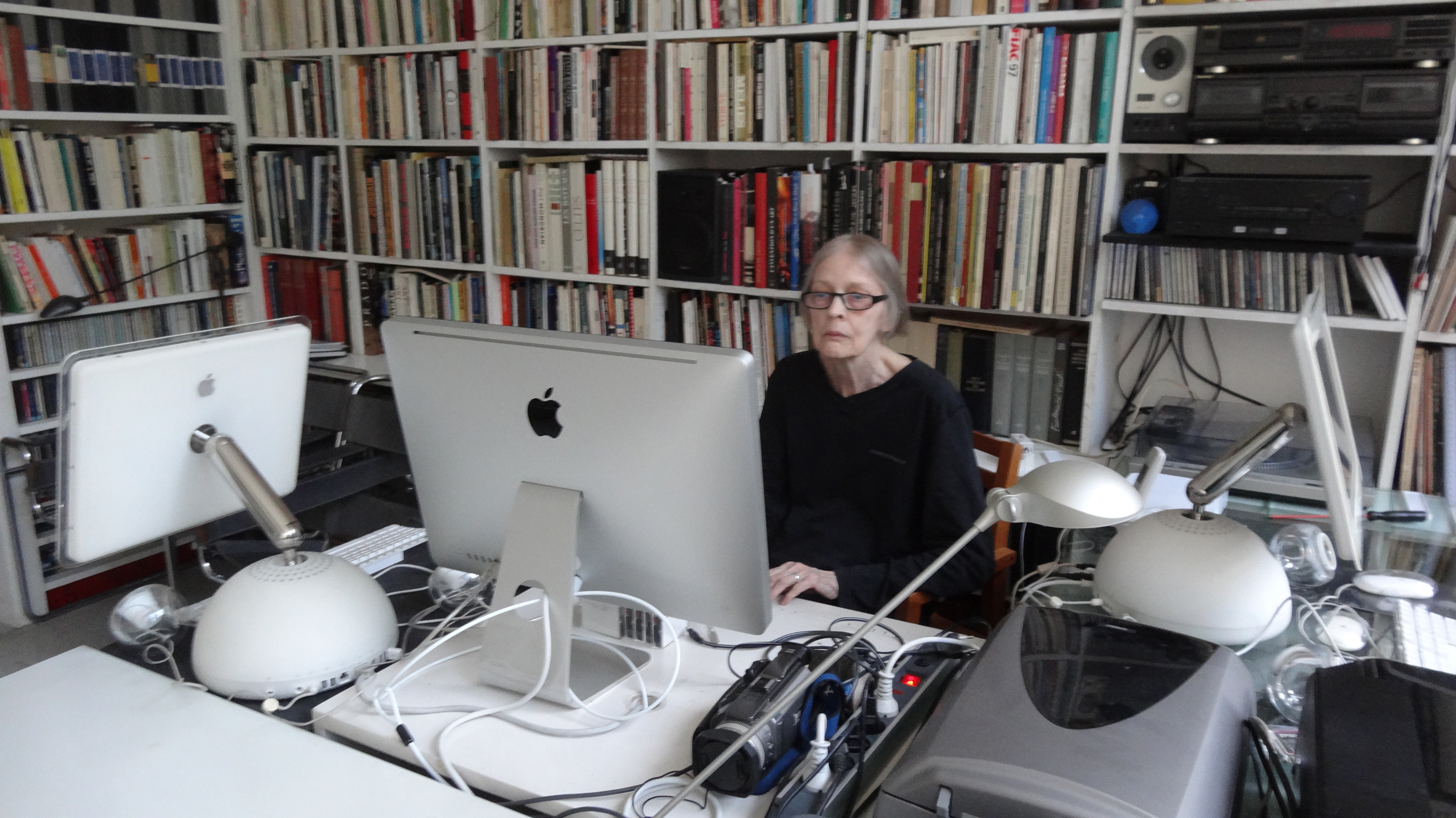
- Nancy Wilson-Pajic
- Born: 1941 (age 84–85); Peru, Indiana
- Education: art, psychology, literature, B.F.A. Cooper Union 1972
- Known for: sound installations, feminist art, photography
- Style: Avant-Garde
- Awards: Chevalier des Arts et des Lettres 1996
- Website: https://pajic-wilson-pajic.com

Nancy Wilson-Pajic (born 1941) is an artist who uses narrative forms (primarily recorded text installations, but also video, performance, photography) to make narrative, content-oriented artworks.

== Biography ==
Wilson-Pajic was born in Peru, Indiana in 1941. She studied art, literature and psychology in Indiana and graduated from Cooper Union, New York in 1972 with a BFA.

Wilson-Pajic began her work in new media in the mid-1960s in New York, installing taped texts “In Situ” in everyday environments, and recording her performance works. In 1973, when she was invited to participate in a performance series at Artists Space in New York, she installed taped texts dealing with such issues as art world celebrity (Limelight) and women's daily lives (Visiting Hour), which created a polemic in the art world because of their form as well as their contents.

As one of the founders of A.I.R. Gallery in New York, the first women's cooperative gallery, Wilson-Pajic was actively implicated in alternative spaces with artworks not yet accepted in more traditional environments. A solo exhibition, at 112 Workshop at 112 Greene Street in 1974, introduced her into the international avant-garde scene where she played an important role throughout the 1970s with her text-sound installations and narrative feminist works (My Grandmother's Gestures, Roles, Disguises...) in Europe and the United States, using the name Nancy Wilson Kitchell.

In 1979, Wilson-Pajic moved to Paris and undertook research on the influence of photography on our understanding of the artworks documented, specifically the tendency of the image to transform difficult content into more conventional, pictorial form. She began experimenting with photographic printing processes, exploring the relations between techniques, subjects, sequences and text. Her first exhibition in a photography context was a solo show at the Musée National d’Art Moderne in the Pompidou Center, Paris in 1983.

Text soon reintegrated her work in a series of large-scale subtitled images (V.O. Soustitré 1985–88) and quickly reassumed its dominant position in her work.

After summing up her experiments with the image in three major museum retrospectives: at the Musée Cantini (1990), the Musée National (1991) and a double retrospective of photographic works and installations in two museums in Aurillac (1992), and after creating, in collaboration with Slobodan Pajic, large-scale photograms in cyanotype of human figures (Falling Angels) and of garments from museum collections (notably Les Divas from the Nouveau Musée National de Monaco) and from Christian Lacroix Haute-Couture (The Apparitions and Les Déesses), she resumed her work in space, creating installations composed of texts and ordinary objects, and continues to explore relations between text, context and space.

Wilson-Pajic's work is represented in museums and other public collections throughout the world, notably the Musée National d’Art Moderne in Paris, the Nouveau Musée National de Monaco, the Dailim Museum in Seoul, The Artphilein Foundation, The Kunstmuseum Liechtenstein in Vaduz, the Museet for Photokunst in Odensee, the Moscow House of Photography, the French National Collection (Fonds National d’Art Contemporain, Paris), Moderna Galerija in Ljubljana, Slovenia, Musée Cantini in Marseille, and the Musée Réattu in Arles.

She was named Chévalier de l'Ordre des Arts et des Lettres by the French Ministry of Culture in 1996.

== Selected bibliography ==
- Allan MOORE, Nancy Kitchel at 112 Greene Street, Artforum, Sept. 1974.
- Jacques CLAYSSEN. Nancy Kitchel, Identité/Identifications (Bordeaux, CAPC, 1976).
- Alan SONDHEIM, ed. Individuals: Post-Movement Art in America (New York, Dutton, 1977).
- Lucy LIPPARD. From the Center: Feminist Essays on Women's Art (New York, Dutton, 1977), pp. 95, 105, 107, 130
- Günter METKEN. Spürensicherung (Köln, Dumont, 1977), pp. 39–46.
- Bernard MILLET, et al. D’un art, l’autre (Marseille, Images en Manoeuvres, 1990), pp. 92–115.
- Robyn BRENTANO with Mark SAVITT, eds. 112 Workshop/112 Greene Street: History, Artists and Artworks (New York University Press, 1981), p. 38.
- Carole CHICHET, Nancy Wilson-Pajic: Créer des espaces "entre"..., Art Press, N° 152, nov. 1990, pp. 43–45.
- Cathy DAY. Nancy Wilson-Pajic: Chronology (Aurillac, La Sellerie, 1992).
- Larousse Dictionnaire mondial de la Photographie des Origins à nos Jours (Paris, Larousse, 1994).
- Carole GEDRINSKY, Nancy Wilson-Pajic, Etat des choses, Etat des lieux (Calais, Musée de Beaux-Arts et de la Dentelle, 1997).
- Camille MORINEAU, et al. Elles@centrepompidou/Femmes. Catalog (Paris, Centre Pompidou, 2009) p. 200.
- Gabriele SCHOR. Feministische Avant Garde 1970er jahre (Hamburger Kunsthalle, 2015), pp. 32–33.
