= Pavle Sazdov =

Macedonian politician (born 1983)

- Павле Саздов

Member of the Macedonian Parliament
- In office 2011–2016
- President: Trajko Veljanovski
- Preceded by: Office established
- Parliamentary group: VMRO-DPMNE
- Constituency: Eight electoral district – Macedonian diaspora (North and South America)

State Secretary at the Ministry of Information Society and Administration
- In office 2010–2011
- Prime Minister: Nikola Gruevski
- Preceded by: Office established

Personal details
- Born: December 27, 1983 (age 42) Skopje, SFR Yugoslavia (present-day North Macedonia)
- Citizenship: Macedonian
- Party: VMRO-DPMNE
- Education: FON University (MSc)
- Occupation: Politician

Pavle Sazdov (Macedonian: Павле Саздов; born December 27, 1983) is a Macedonian former politician. He served as state secretary at the Ministry of Information Society and Administration from 2010 to 2011, and as a member of parliament in the Macedonian National Assembly from 2011 to 2016, representing the Macedonian diaspora in North and South America.

== Early life and education ==
Sazdov was born on December 27, 1983, in Skopje, then part of the Socialist Federal Republic of Yugoslavia (now North Macedonia). He went to Canada when he was still in high school and lived in Toronto.

Sazdov graduated in the field of Information Technologies at Everest College - School of Technology in 2005 in Canada. He received an Honors Bachelor of Science degree in Information and Communication Technologies in FON University at Skopje, while also receiving a master's degree from the same institute. His wife is a diplomat.

== Career ==
Sazdov joined VMRO-DPMNE's Youth Force Union in 1997. He worked as a business consultant in information technologies for "Best Buy Canada". Per himself, he returned to Macedonia (now North Macedonia) in 2010 at the invitation of former prime minister Nikola Gruevski to become state secretary in the Ministry of Information Society and Administration. He said that his position on the Macedonia naming dispute was identical to VMRO-DPMNE's position and that "there must be no bending of the spine at any cost". Under the motto "Reforms will win", Sazdov was a candidate as a VMRO-DPMNE deputy in the eight electoral district for the early 2011 parliamentary elections, where he advocated for the formation of an American-Macedonian Chamber of Commerce and the facilitation of the procedure for Macedonian citizenship. His mandate as state secretary for the Ministry of Information Society and Administration ended when he was elected as the first member of the Macedonian Assembly representing the Macedonian diaspora from North and South America. Sazdov also was a member of the Foreign Policy Committee and the president of the Inter Party Parliamentary Group for the Rights of People with Disabilities.

In December 2013, he visited Toronto, where he said that the main subjects were promotion of the learning of the Macedonian language among the diaspora, securing Macedonian citizens with personal documents and the participation of the diaspora voters in the next presidential elections. He was re-elected in the early parliamentary elections in 2014 with 1,170 votes. In 2014, Sazdov spent over €16,000 for traveling abroad, the most out of any Macedonian member of the Assembly.

He was the head of the Commission for supervision of wiretapping in July 2015. In November 2015, he was elected as a member of the Inquiry Committee on the wiretapping scandal.

In November 2015, a coordinator of the Social Democratic Union of Macedonia accused Sazdov of being illegitimately elected because his votes were 1:10 compared to the votes needed to elect a deputy in the country, with law amendments stipulating that a minimum of 6,000 votes for a candidate from the diaspora was needed to be elected as a deputy. A member of the Liberal Democratic Party accused Sazdov of not living among his own voters after being employed as a state secretary.
