= Maximilian Uhland =

German missionary

Maximilian Uhland [called Father Bernardino de San José] (c. 1475 near Crefeld – 1538 in Mexico) was a German missionary.

== Biography ==
He became a Franciscan friar, and, being assigned to the American missions, went to Hispaniola in 1520 with the newly appointed Bishop Alessandro Geraldini. After learning the Indian language, he was attached to a mission in the interior, but as he opposed the policy of the conquerors, which brought about the depopulation of the island, he was ordered to leave the country, and went to New Spain in 1526. There he was appointed guardian of the newly founded convent of Santiago de Tlatelolco, but subsequently he was sent to labor in Guatemala.

In 1535 he was a member of the commission headed by Father Domingo Betanzos which laid before Pope Paul III the wretched condition of the Indians. Uhland, who was a Latinist of reputation, was instructed to speak before the congregation of the propaganda, and induced the pope to issue his celebrated bull entitled “Veritas Ipsa,” This for a time improved the condition of the Indians, but the prompters of the bull were never forgiven by the Spanish authorities, and Uhland, to avoid persecution, on his return to Mexico did not leave his convent until his death. He left a valuable manuscript, which is preserved in the National Library at Paris, entitled “Historia de la fundación de la provincia de Santiago de Tlaltelolco.”
