= Paja (given name) =

Paja (Serbian Cyrillic: Паја) is a Serbian masculine given name, a diminutive form of Pavle. Notable people with the name include:

- Paja Jovanović (1859–1957), Serbian painter
- Paja Dolezar (born 1944), Serbian football player and manager
- Paja Francuski (1949–2023), Serbian politician

It was also the nom de guerre of Slobodan Bajić Paja (1916–1943).

== See also ==
- Pajo (given name), a diminutive of Pavle/Pavao
