= Slobodan Pajic =

Visual artist using a variety of media in plastic research

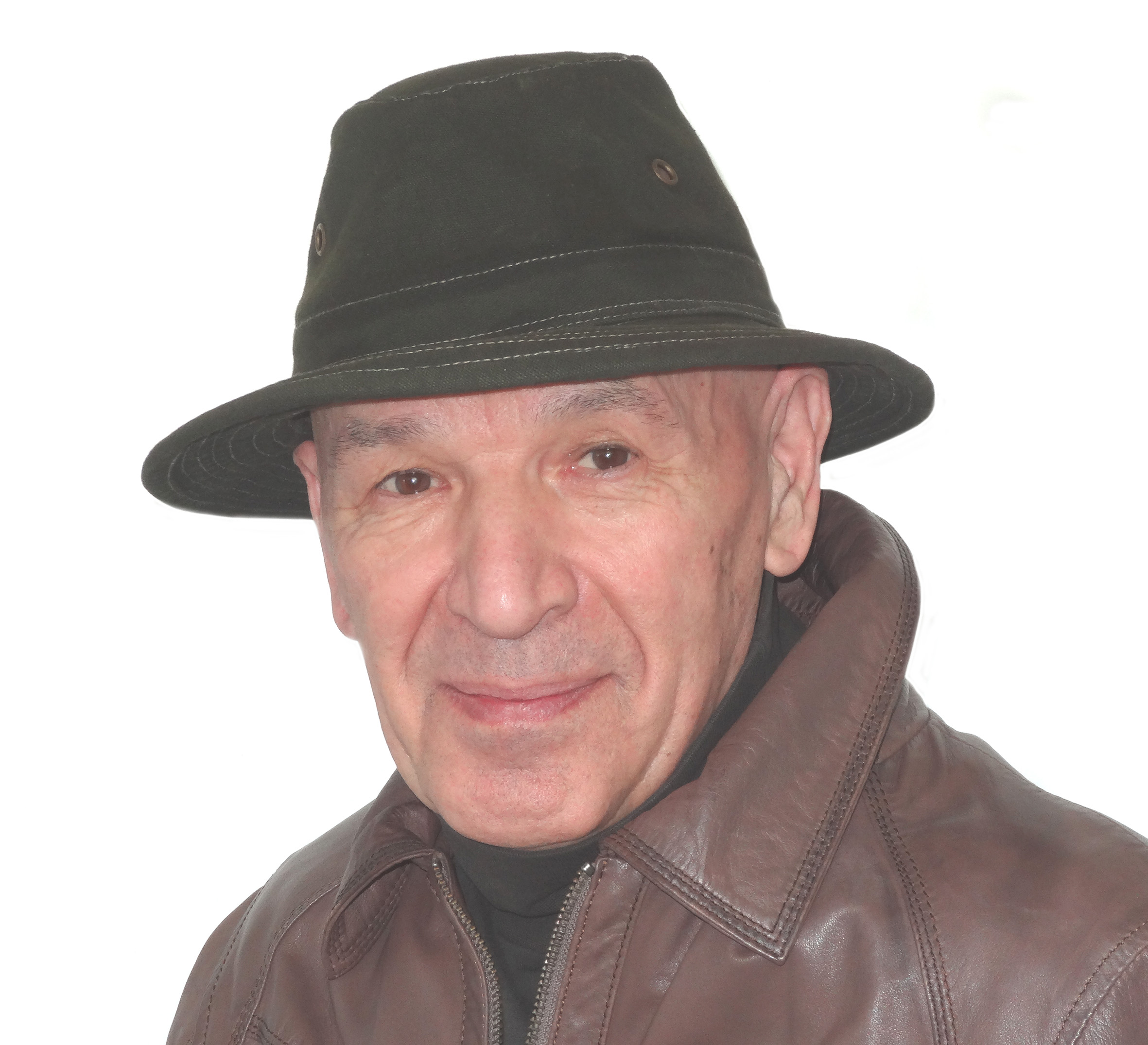
- Slobodan Pajic 2016
- Born: 1943 (age 82–83); Srpski Vakuf, Kingdom of Yugoslavia
- Education: Art History
- Known for: Video art, installation, painting, printmaking
- Notable work: Destruction du son et de l’image, Passage de l’espace fermé à l’espace ouvert, Mémoires, Rélecteurs d’images, Capteurs d’images
- Style: Avant-garde
- Website: https://pajic-wilson-pajic.com

Slobodan Pajic (born 1943) is a visual artist who uses a variety of media (primarily video, laser light, photography, film, sound) in his plastic research. He began very early to work with new technologies to create unique abstract and graphic forms, employing a series of chance techniques at the limits of technology, which he transforms into video films, graphics, installations and sculptures.

Pajic follows progress in the sciences and adopts the latest concepts and technology in a quest for new forms, new materials and new artistic possibilities.

== Biography ==
Born August 16, 1943, in the Kingdom of Yugoslavia, Slobodan Pajic arrived in Paris in 1966 to study art history at the Sorbonne but was soon prompted to reorient himself to his own painting. He lives and works in Paris and has become a French citizen.

At the beginning of the 1970s, his abstract, geometrical art brought him success, but his passion for new media, as “new supports” for creation, soon won out. One of his early solo shows was the organization of space with laser light (Square root in a square) at the American Center in Paris in 1972. As soon as 1/2 inch video equipment was available, Pajic began to work on a series of short videos unlike anything done before: Exploiting the incapacity of the video scanning pattern to register isolated instants in their entirety, Pajic introduced abrupt changes by breaking reflective surfaces before the camera. (Dany Bloch)

The new Centre Georges Pompidou, in Paris, lent their post-production facilities for a compilation of these short films, Untitled 76: Destruction of Sound and Image, and provided some of the first showings. The enthusiastic reaction of the art world prompted the Musée National d’Art moderne to commission Pajic to produce the first artist’s video in their new, two-inch video studios. (Moisdon) Untitled 77 : Passage From Closed To Open Space, an abstract film in saturated color, continues to occupy a unique position in the history of video art.

In 1980, after a stay in New York, and a year of travel throughout Europe, Pajic settled into a new studio in Paris and began a series of installation pieces employing video screens and projections.

An Image Reflector installation consists of a mirrored video screen on the wall, before which is placed a video monitor with an abstract, repetitive film, accompanied by an electronic signal. As the spectator approaches the screen to see the film, his or her own reflection becomes part of the experience. (Nieto & Wilson-Pajic)

The Image Captors installations are typically composed of a large video screen on a wall, before which is placed a projector on a Plexiglas pedestal. The screen has been prepared with materials that capture the projection and restitute it in the dark. The image fades slowly, in the same way as an impression in short-term memory, and is replaced by another. (Nieto & Wilson-Pajic)

In 1996, the French National Museum of Modern Art commissioned an installation from the Image Captors series. The result, a large multi-screen installation Mémoires was presented in the anniversary exhibition Made In France. To the sound of a rocket launcher called Stalin’s Organ, images of war on 16 mm film decomposed motion and imprinted a prepared video screen, then abruptly disappeared, leaving the after-image to slowly fade in silence. On the other side of the room, 4 projections of fixed images of combats and refugees appeared in violent bursts and disappeared into the darkness. (Françoise Parfait) The piece is an altogether moving indictment of war and aggression.

In the early 80s, Pajic began a series of pictorial works exploiting the inability of laser light to pass through certain distortions of materials, by which he produced abstract, chance patterns and transformed them into arresting pictorial works (Graphismes). A series of installations followed, in which laser beams confront transparent and reflective forms to create abstract figures in space. (Official site)

At the beginning of the 90s, he constructed a high-frequency device and started work on a series of Electrophotograms. Based on the Tesla effect, the images are composed of minute points of light emanating from the material itself. The use of computer technology restores to the image all its brilliance and complexity. (Official site)

Since then, Pajic has continued to develop a body of work composed of installations, videos, films, graphic and photographic images. He has participated in numerous personal and collective exhibitions: Maastricht Museum, Evénement 03.23,03 in Montréal, the National Gallery of Canada in Ottawa, Musée National d'Art Moderne in Paris, Biennale de São Paulo, Video 79 in Rome, Biennale de Paris, Serpentine Gallery in London, Vor-Film Video in Munich. The Kitchen in New York, The Bay Area Video Coalition in San Francisco, the first video retrospective at the Long Beach Muséum of Art, Moderna Museet in Stockholm....

== Selected bibliography ==
- Pierre Emmanuel, et al. French Art Vidéo (Paris, Center for Media Art, 1980)
- Dany Bloch. L’Art Vidéo 1960/80-82 (Locarno, Flaviana, 1983).
- Kathy Rae Huffman, et al.Vidéo: A Rétrospective 1974-1984 (Long Beach Museum of Art, 1984),
- Jose Coira-Nieto and Nancy Wilson-Pajic. Slobodan Pajic (La Coruna, CGAI, 1994)
- Stéphanie Moisdon, Slobodan Pajic, in Christine Van Assche, ed. Vidéo et après : La collection vidéo du Musée national d'Art moderne (Paris, Centre Georges Pompidou / Carré, 1992).
- Françoise Parfait. Vidéo : un Art contemporain (Paris, éd. du Regard, 2001), pp. 86–88.
