= Pajo (given name) =

Pajo is a masculine given name, a diminutive form of Pavle or Pavao.

- Pajo Ivošević (born 1968), Serbian wrestler
- Pajo Kolarić (1821–1876), Croatian composer

== See also ==
- Paja (given name), a diminutive of Pavle
- Pejo, a diminutive of Petar
