= Pavle (Archbishop of Peć) =

Pavle I
- Archbishop of Peć
- Church: Serbian Patriarchate of Peć and Archbishopric of Ohrid (in dispute)
- Installed: around 1530
- Term ended: 1541
- Other post: Metropolitan of Smederevo (until 1530)
- Previous post: Metropolitan of Smederevo

Personal details
- Born: Before 1500
- Died: After 1541
- Denomination: Eastern Orthodoxy
- Residence: Smederevo (until 1530); Patriarchate of Peć Monastery (c. 1530–41)

Pavle I (Serbian Cyrillic: Павле I; fl. 1527–1541) was the Archbishop of Peć and self-proclaimed Serbian Patriarch from around 1530 to 1541. He tried to end the long period of vacancy of the patriarchal trone of the Serbian Patriarchate of Peć, with limited and temporary success.

== Biography ==
As the Metropolitan of Smederevo, he managed with the help of notable Serbs and some Ottoman officials to take control over the Archiepiscopal see of Peć, and worked toward its renewed autocephaly, recreating the Serbian Patriarchate of Peć that had been vacant since 1463 and formally abolished by the Ottomans, who transferred all Serbian eparchies to the jurisdiction of the Archbishopric of Ohrid.

Most of the higher clergy, however, supported the Archbishop Prohor of Ohrid, and on the Church assembly on 13 March 1532 anathematized Pavle and his followers. After some time Pavle made peace with Prohor, and recognized his supreme jurisdiction, but later began a more active struggle for removing Peć from the jurisdiction of Ohrid. He successfully had Prohor and his closest people imprisoned by the Ottoman government, and had unreliable bishops removed and began reorganizing Serbian Orthodox Church, proclaiming himself Serbian Patriarch.

Prohor managed to free himself and after talks with the Sultan was reappointed as Archbishopric of Ohrid. Upon Prohor's return, an assembly was summoned on 20 July 1541 which stripped Pavle of his titles and priesthood, along with bishop Neofit of Lesnovo, Teofan of Zvornik and Pahomije of Kratovo, all of whom Pavle had appointed – those who still recognized them as their bishops were to be anathematized. After this, Pavle went into exile.

== Sources ==
- Fotić, Aleksandar (2008). "Serbian Orthodox Church". Encyclopedia of the Ottoman Empire. New York: Infobase Publishing. pp. 519–520. ISBN 9781438110257.
- Ćirković, Sima (2004). The Serbs. Malden: Blackwell Publishing. ISBN 9781405142915.
- Kašić, Dušan, ed. (1965). Serbian Orthodox Church: Its past and present. Vol. 1. Belgrade: Serbian Orthodox Church.
- Pavlovich, Paul (1989). The History of the Serbian Orthodox Church. Serbian Heritage Books. ISBN 9780969133124.
- Пузовић, Предраг (2000). Кратка историја Српске православне цркве. Крагујевац: Каленић.
- Слијепчевић, Ђоко М. (1962). Историја Српске православне цркве (History of the Serbian Orthodox Church). Vol. књ. 1. Минхен: Искра.
- Вуковић, Сава (1996). Српски јерарси од деветог до двадесетог века (Serbian Hierarchs from the 9th to the 20th Century). Београд: Евро.
