= Christianity in the 21st century =

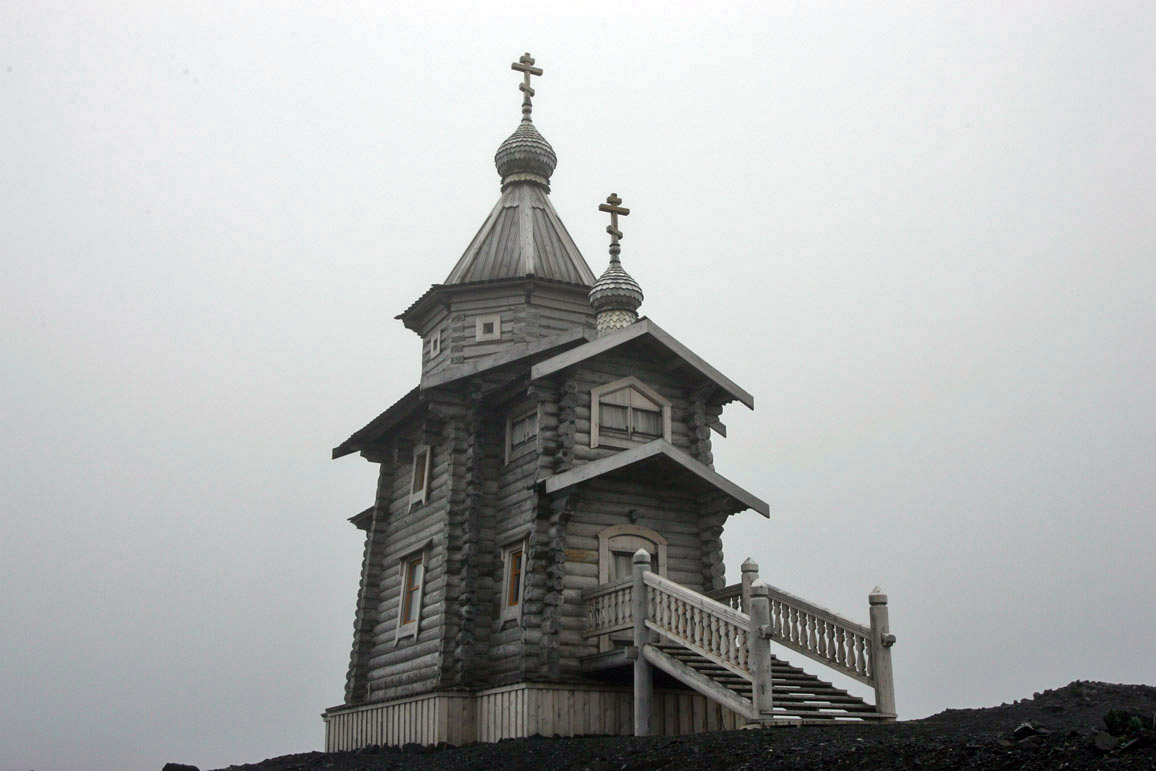
Trinity Church, Antarctica, a 15m-high Siberian pine Russian Orthodox church that can accommodate up to 30 worshipers. It opened in 2004, and it is manned year-around by Orthodox hieromonk priests volunteering for the Antarctic assignment.

Christianity in the 21st century is characterized by the pursuit of church unity and the continued resistance to persecution and secularization.

== Catholic Church ==
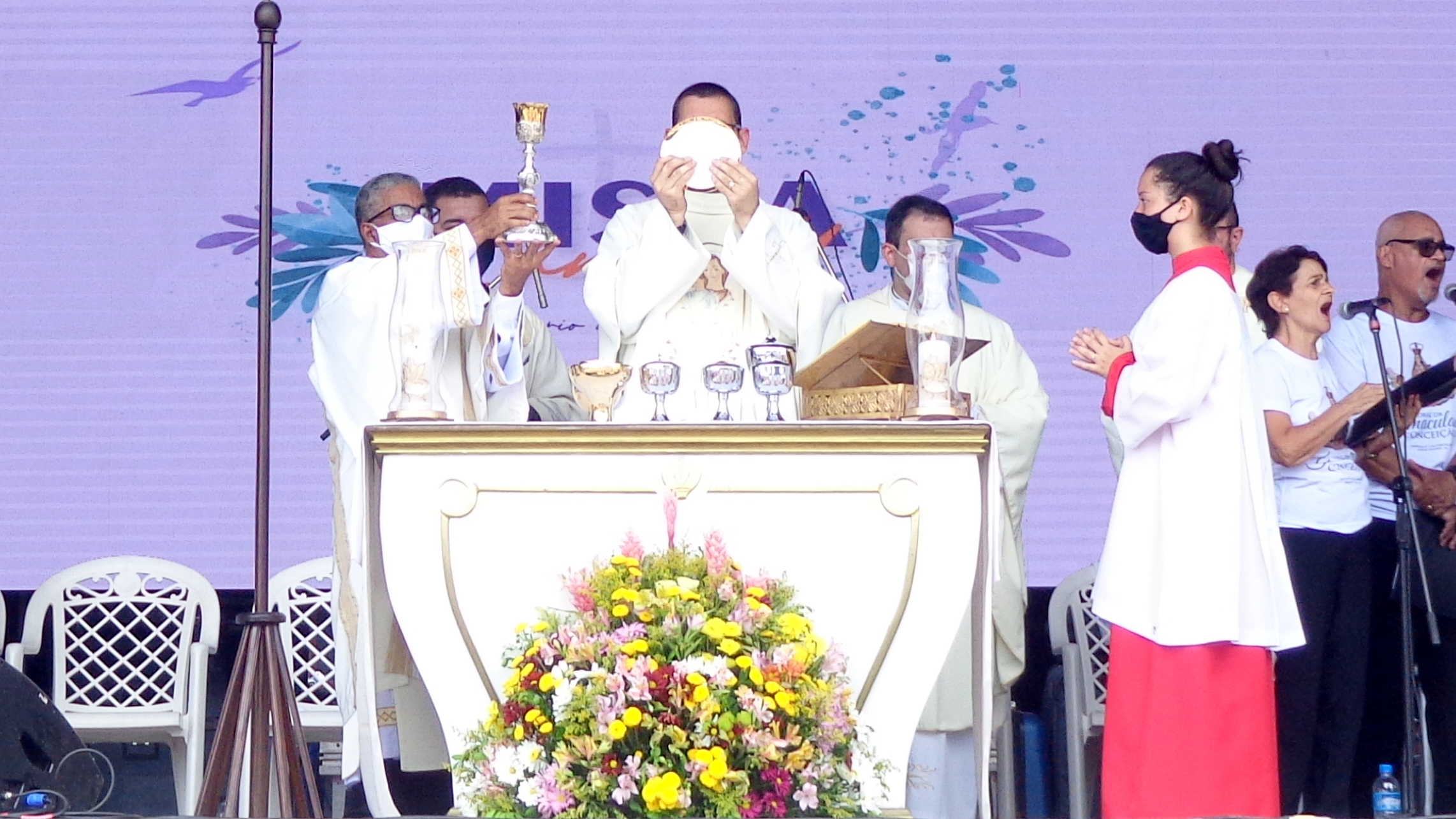
A Catholic priest celebrating Mass in Brazil, 2022

=== Benedict XVI ===
With the election of Pope Benedict XVI, there was decentralized beatifications and reverted a decision of John Paul II regarding papal elections. Benedict XVI advocated a return to fundamental Christian values to counter the increased secularisation of many Western countries. He taught the importance of both the Catholic Church and an understanding of God's redemptive love. Pope Benedict also revived a number of traditions, including elevating the Tridentine Mass to a more prominent position. He strengthened the relationship between the Catholic Church and art, promoted the use of Latin, and reintroduced traditional papal garments, for which reason he was called "the pope of aesthetics".

Major lawsuits emerged in 2001, during the pontificate of John Paul II, claiming that priests had sexually abused minors. As a cardinal, Benedict convinced John Paul II to put his Congregation for the Doctrine of the Faith in charge of all investigations and policies surrounding sexual abuse in order to combat such abuse more efficiently. In 2006 Pope Benedict XVI removed Legion of Christ founder Marcial Maciel from active ministry based on the results of an investigation that he had started while head of the Congregation for the Doctrine of the Faith, before his election as Pope in April 2005. Maciel was ordered "to conduct a reserved life of prayer and penance, renouncing every public ministry." As pope, Benedict defrocked at least 400 priests.

In July 2007, Pope Benedict issued the motu proprio Summorum Pontificum, allowing priests to celebrate the Tridentine Mass without first having to receive permission from their local ordinary. The Priestly Society of Saint Pius X, which was consulted by Pope Benedict during the process, said in a statement that it "extends its deep gratitude to (Pope Benedict) for this great spiritual benefit" and "rejoices to see the Church thus regain her liturgical Tradition, and give the possibility of a free access to the treasure of the Traditional Mass ... (for those) who had so far been deprived of it." The Jewish Anti-Defamation League (ADL) attacked the motu proprio, because the text of the Good Friday Prayer for the Jews in the 1962 Missal includes a request to God to "lift the veil" from Jewish hearts and to show mercy, according to one translation, "even to the Jews" (or "also to the Jews"), and refers to "the blindness of that people" (to Christ). In reply to such criticisms, Dr John Newton, editor of Baronius Press, pointed out that the prayer draws heavily on 2 Corinthians chapters 3 and 4, and the invocation for God to "lift the veil from their hearts" is a direct quote from 2 Cor 3:15. These guidelines remained in place until July 2021, when Pope Francis abrogated Summorum Pontificum.

In October 2009, the Congregation for the Doctrine of the Faith announced Pope Benedict XVI's intention to create a new type of ecclesiastical structure, called a personal ordinariate, for groups of Anglicans entering into full communion with the see of Rome. This created structures for former Anglicans within the Catholic Church independent of existing Latin Church dioceses. The personal ordinariates utilize the Anglican Use for their liturgy, a use of the Roman Rite modified with Anglican elements; the ordinariates also retain elements of Anglican spirituality and religious practice, including married priests but not married bishops. Anglicanorum coetibus was issued on 4 November 2009. "The Personal Ordinariate of the Chair of St. Peter is equivalent to a diocese, created by the Vatican in 2012 for people nurtured in the Anglican tradition who wish to become Catholic."

With support from Pope Benedict, in November 2011, Cardinal Antonio Cañizares Llovera, Prefect of the Congregation for Divine Worship, established a "Liturgical art and sacred music commission" which will be responsible for evaluating both new construction and renovation projects as well as music used during the celebration of Mass to ensure that they comply with church guidelines. Previously, it was common for churches to be renovated in a way critics often described as a "wreckovation."

On 28 February 2013, Pope Benedict XVI resigned from his ministry as pope. Benedict's decision to step down (Note: Formally "renounce", from the Latin, "renuntiet" (cf. canon 332 §2, 1983 Code of Canon Law)) as leader of the Catholic Church made him the first pope to relinquish the office since Gregory XII in 1415 (who did so in order to end the Western Schism), the first to do so on his own initiative since Celestine V in 1294,

=== Francis ===
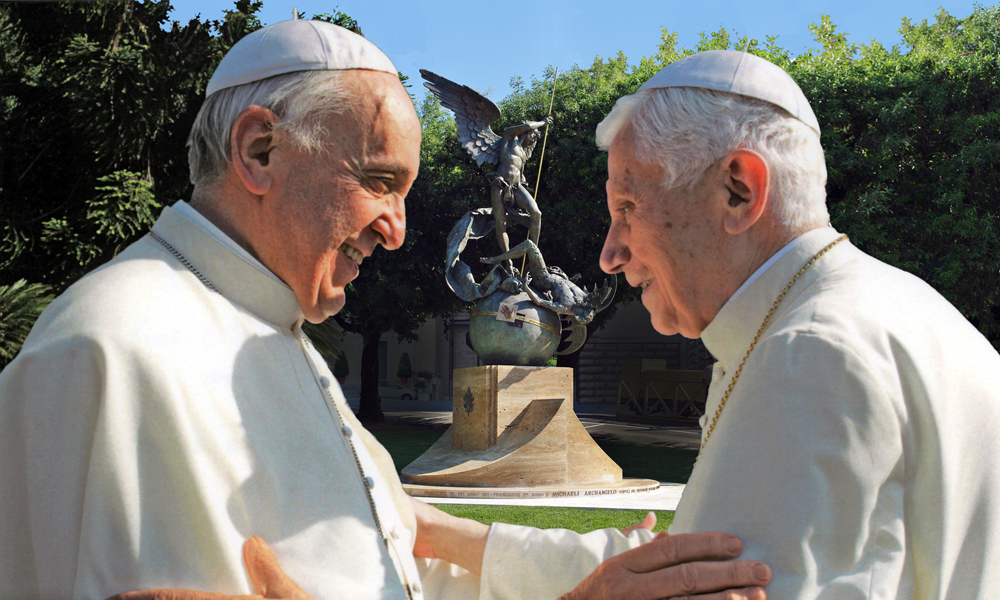
Pope Francis (left) and his predecessor Pope emeritus Benedict XVI (right)

Elected in 2013, Pope Francis displayed a simpler and less formal approach to the office, choosing to reside in the Vatican guesthouse rather than the papal residence. Following the resignation of Benedict, Francis became the first Jesuit pope, the first pope from the Americas, and the first from the Southern Hemisphere.

On 18 June 2015, Francis released his encyclical Laudato si', in which he critiqued consumerism and irresponsible development, lamented environmental degradation and global warming, and called all people of the world to take "swift and unified global action."

On 2 August 2018, it was announced that the Catechism of the Catholic Church would be revised to state that the Church teaches that "the death penalty is inadmissible because it is an attack on the inviolability and dignity of the person". A full letter to the bishops regarding the change stated that it was consistent with the previous teachings of the Catholic Church regarding the dignity of human life, and that it reflected how modern society had better prison systems with a goal of criminal rehabilitation that made the death penalty unnecessary for the protection of innocent people.

In March 2020 all public masses were suspended in Vatican City and Italy due to the coronavirus pandemic. These suspensions began in late-February in the Archdioceses of Milan and Venice and were extended to the rest of the Italian peninsula on 8 March. Setting an example for churches unable to celebrate public masses due to the lockdown, Pope Francis began livestreaming daily masses from his home on 9 March. Outside Italy, masses in cities around the world were suspended in the days that followed. At the height of the outbreak in Italy, on 27 March, Pope Francis imparted the Urbi et Orbi blessing, normally reserved for Christmas and Easter, from an empty Saint Peter's Square following a prayer for the health of all the world. For the prayer service, Francis brought the crucifix from San Marcello al Corso which had processed through the streets of Rome during a plague in 1522 and is believed to have led to miraculous curing. The prayer service concluded with Benediction of the Blessed Sacrament, as church bells were rung and sirens blared across Rome. The spread of COVID-19 soon slowed in Italy and public masses were allowed to resume on 18 May, with Pope Francis celebrating his last daily live-stream mass and first public mass since the lockdown on the centenary of the birth of Pope John Paul II.

In March 2022, Francis promulgated the apostolic constitution Praedicate evangelium, reforming the Roman Curia and allowing lay Catholics to lead dicasteries.

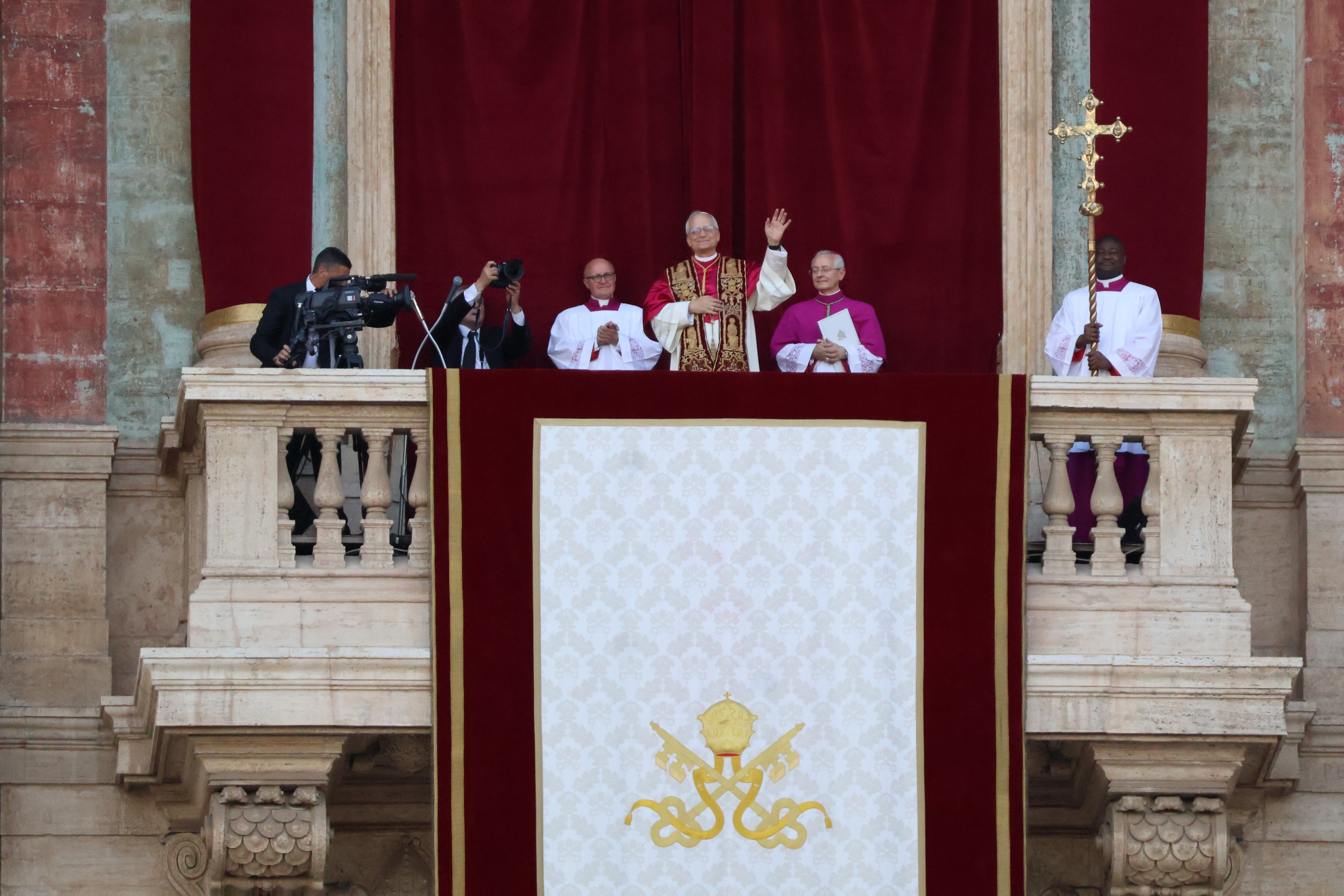
Pope Leo XIV waves from the balcony of St. Peter's Basilica to the people gathered following his election as pope

Francis died on 21 April 2025, the morning after greeting people in St. Peter's Square for Easter Sunday. His successor Pope Leo XIV was elected by the College of Cardinals on 8 May 2025. An Augustinian friar and former bishop of Chiclayo, Peru, Leo XIV is the first citizen of the United States to be elected pope.

=== Leo XIV ===
The pontificate of Leo XIV has been defined by an emphasis on global diplomacy, a consistent life ethic, and the advocacy of marginalized populations. On the geopolitical stage, Leo has been active in condemning nationalism and issuing strict calls for peace during the 2026 Iran war. Additionally, his magisterium has actively engaged with contemporary technological advancements; his first papal encyclical Magnifica Humanitas addressed the ethics of artificial intelligence, warning against its deployment in automated warfare and its potential to exacerbate economic inequality and labor displacement.

On 1 July 2026, the Society of St. Pius X at Écône, Switzerland, consecrated four men as bishops without a papal mandate, with Alfonso de Galarreta as principal consecrator and Bernard Fellay as co-consecrator. The Holy See declared the consecrations to be a schismatic act and excommunicated all the clergy and lay supporters of the society. This is the largest schism in the Catholic Church since the Old Catholic movement split from the church more than 150 years earlier and has been described as a major test of Leo XIV's pontificate.

== Eastern Orthodoxy ==
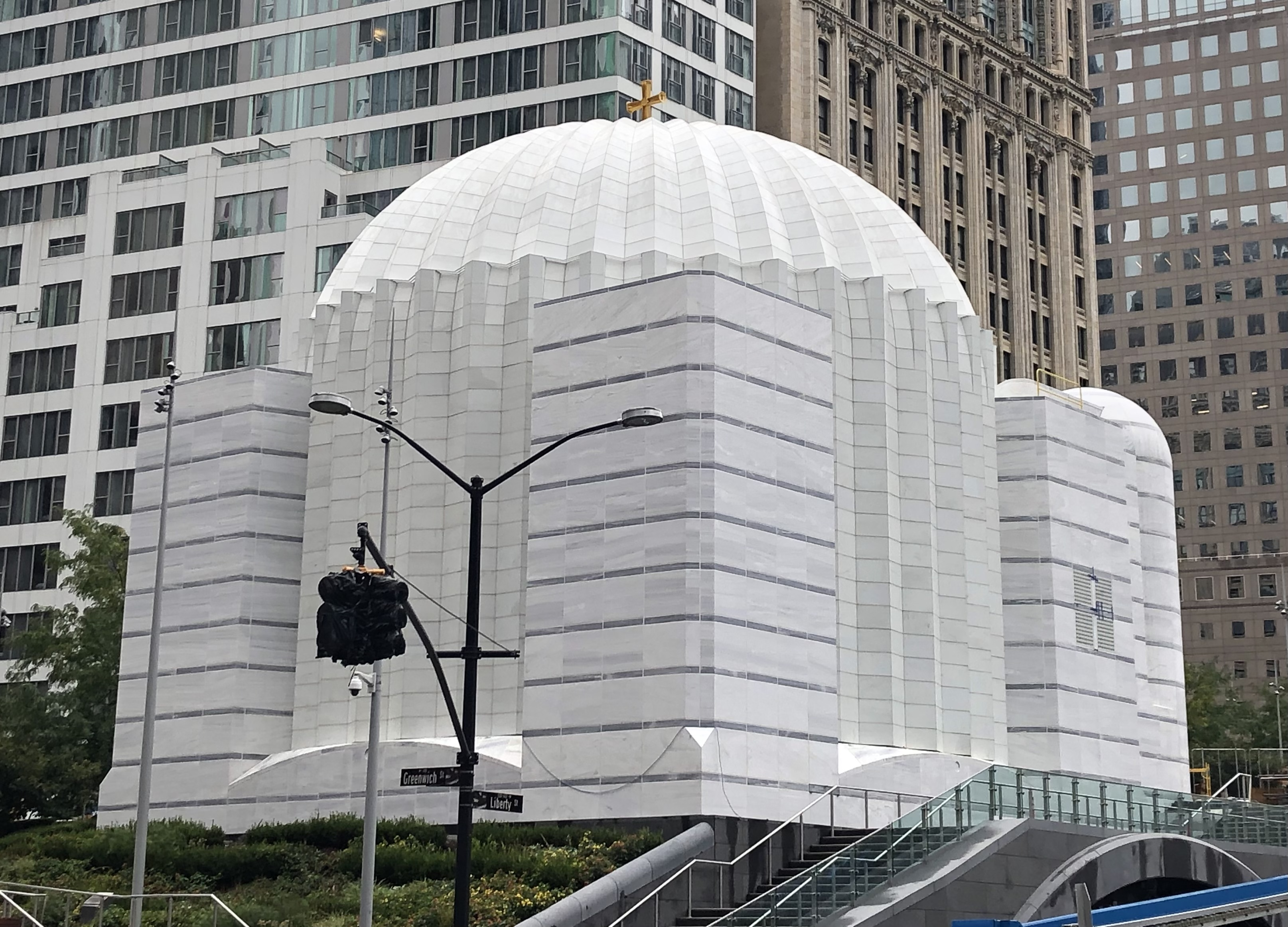
St. Nicholas Greek Orthodox Church in New York City, rebuilt after the original church was destroyed in the September 11 attacks

=== Pan-Orthodox Council ===
The Pan-Orthodox Council, officially styled the Holy and Great Synod, opened at Crete, on 19 June 2016. The 10 Churches that sent representatives to Crete were the Ecumenical Patriarchate of Constantinople and the Orthodox Churches of Alexandria, Jerusalem, Serbia, Romania, Greece, Poland, Albania, Cyprus and the Czech Lands and Slovakia. Of the 14 national Orthodox churches, four did not attend the event, including the Russian Orthodox Church, the Georgian and Bulgarian Orthodox Churches, as well as the Orthodox Church of Antioch. The Council concluded on 26 June 2016, the Sunday of All Saints, with a Patriarchal Concelebration.

=== 2018 Moscow–Constantinople schism ===
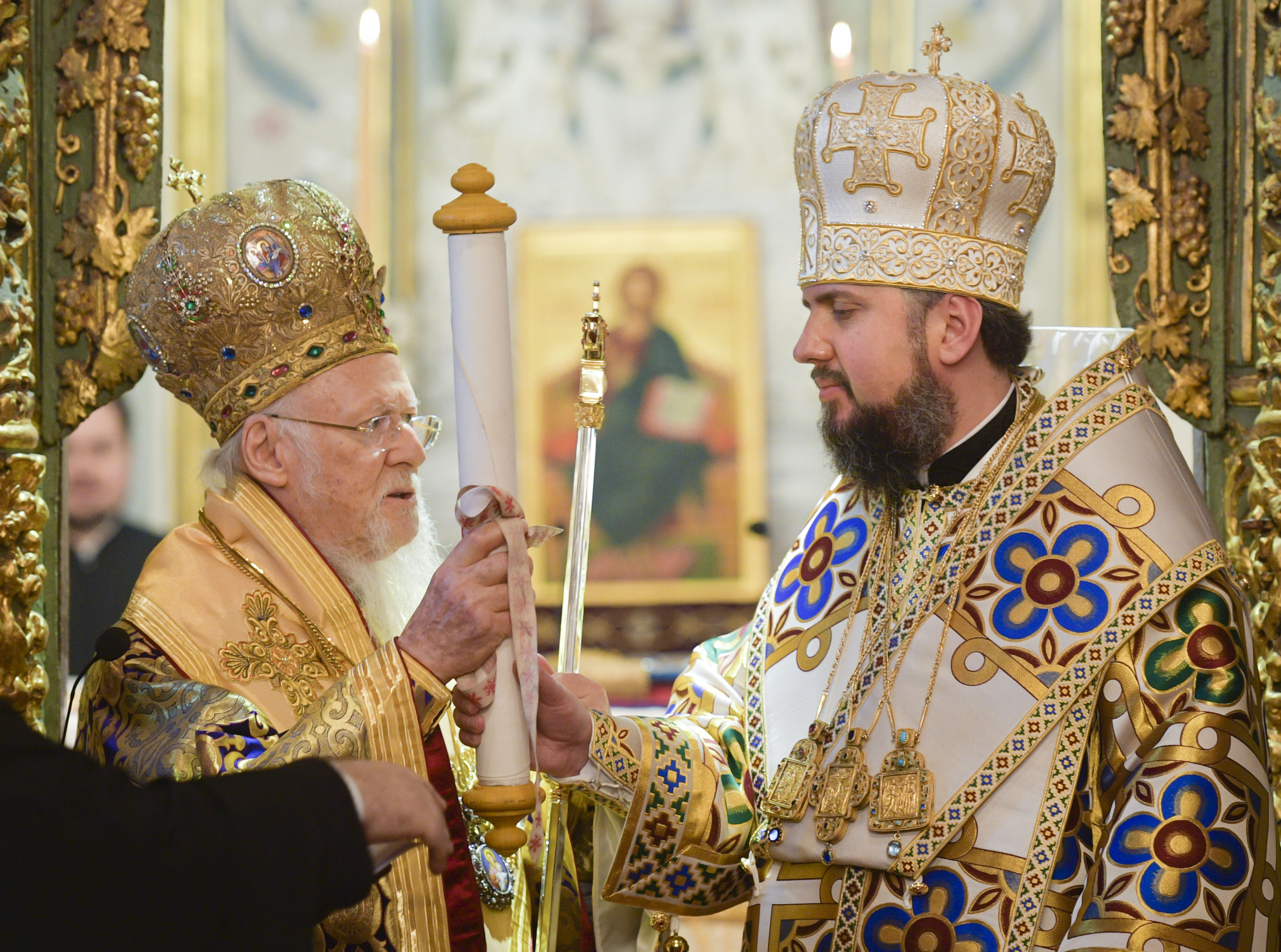
Ecumenical Patriarch Bartholomew (left) handing the tomos of autocephaly to Metropolitan Epiphanius (right), January 6, 2019

On 11 October 2018, the Ecumenical Patriarchate of Constantinople announced it would grant autocephaly to the "Church of Ukraine" thus separating it from the canonical jurisdiction of the Moscow Patriarchate. Four days later, the Moscow Patriarchate broke the communion with the Ecumenical Patriarchate of Constantinople over the latter's endorsement of the Ukrainian Orthodox church's autocephaly. The decision was made following a meeting of the Russian Holy Synod in Minsk, the capital of Belarus. Metropolitan Hilarion announced that the Moscow Patriarchate had taken the decision to "rupture full communion with the Constantinople Patriarchate", meaning that priests from the two churches will not be able to serve together while worshippers of one cannot take communion in the other.

Two months later, on 15 December 2018, a unification council was convoked by the Ecumenical Patriarchate of Constantinople at St Sophia's Cathedral in Kyiv, during which the Kyiv Patriarchate, the Ukrainian Autocephalous Orthodox Church and parts of the Ukrainian Orthodox Church (Moscow Patriarchate) were united into a single church: the Ukrainian Orthodox Church. Metropolitan Epiphanius was elected the first Metropolitan of Kyiv and All Ukraine of the newly unified Ukrainian church. Patriarch Kirill of Moscow denounced the new Ukrainian Church as "a union of two schismatic groups."

On 5 January 2019, Ecumenical Patriarch Bartholomew signed a tomos officially granting autocephaly to the Ukrainian Orthodox Church. The tomos was signed at St. George's Cathedral in the presence of Petro Poroshenko, the President of Ukraine, and was presented to Metropolitan Epiphanius to be brought to Kyiv in time for Christmas, the first liturgy celebrated by the united Ukrainian Orthodox Church.

On 30 May 2019, Vladimir Legoyda, head of the Synodal Department for Church, Society and Media Relations of the ROC, said the ROC was aware of the efforts of the Church of Cyprus primate, Chrysostomos II, and added that "to some extent [Chrysostomos'] actions can be considered in line with the ROC proposal (...) He has consistently held talks with representatives from various local Churches, telling of the need to resolve the problem" Legoyda also said the ROC "has repeatedly stressed the desire and the need for a pan-Orthodox decision on this issue because it cannot be resolved unilaterally"

On 12 October 2019, the Orthodox Church of Greece, headed by the Archbishop Ieronymos II recognized the Autocephaly of the Orthodox Church of Ukraine, stating that "the Ecumenical Patriarchate of Constantinople has the right to granting autocephalies"

On 8 November 2019, the Patriarchate of Alexandria, ranked second in the diptych of the Eastern Orthodox Churches of the world, officially announced it had recognized the Orthodox Church of Ukraine, and Patriarch Theodore II of Alexandria formally recognised the Autocephaly granted by the Ecumenical Patriarchate of Constantinople to the Orthodox Church of Ukraine earlier that year.

On 24 October 2020, the primate of the Church of Cyprus, Archbishop Chrysostomos II, commemorated Epiphanius of Ukraine during the Divine Liturgy, thus recognising the Orthodox Church of Ukraine.

=== Hagia Sophia and Chora Church ===
In early July 2020, the Turkish Council of State annulled the Cabinet's 1934 decision to establish the museum, revoking the monument's status, and a subsequent decree by Turkish president Recep Tayyip Erdoğan ordered the reclassification of Hagia Sophia as a mosque. The 1934 decree was ruled to be unlawful under both Ottoman and Turkish law as Hagia Sophia's waqf, endowed by Sultan Mehmed, had designated the site a mosque; proponents of the decision argued the Hagia Sophia was the personal property of the sultan. This redesignation is controversial, invoking condemnation from the Turkish opposition, Ecumenical Patriarch Bartholomew I of Constantinople, UNESCO, the World Council of Churches, the International Association of Byzantine Studies, and many international leaders.

In November 2019, the Turkish Council of State, Turkey's highest administrative court, ordered that Chora Church was to be reconverted to a mosque. In August 2020, its status changed to a mosque. The move to convert Chora Church into a mosque was condemned by the Greek Foreign Ministry and Christians. This caused a sharp rebuke by Turkey.

=== Archdiocese of Ohrid ===
The President of North Macedonia expressed his hope and expectation for a final settlement of the administrative status of his country's church in the near future through the granting of an Autocephaly Tomos by the Ecumenical Patriarchate, stressing that the completion of the autocephaly of the church of North Macedonia is a top national interest. The Holy and Sacred Synod of Constantinople convened Monday May 9, 2022, under the chairmanship of Ecumenical Patriarch Bartholomew, and discussed extensively the ecclesiastical matter of Skopje. Having assessed in its final stage the petition of appeal of that Church to the Mother Church, along with the repeated pleas of the State of North Macedonia, the Ecumenical Patriarchate announced that it welcomes in Eucharistic communion "the hierarchy, clergy, and people of this Church under Archbishop Stefan." It makes clear that it excludes the term "Macedonian" and any other derivative of the word "Macedonia", and recognizes the name of the Church as "Ohrid". Ecumenical Patriarch Bartholomew clarified that it was up to the Church of Serbia to settle the administrative issues between it and the Church in North Macedonia. He promises to continue to be interested in the progress and stability of the Ohrid ecclesiastical entity.

The Serbian Orthodox Church accepted the request of the Church of North Macedonia to acquire autocephaly. On May 24, 2022, the Patriarch of Serbia and the Archbishop of Ohrid co-officiated the Divine Liturgy for the feast of Saints Cyril and Methodius at the Cathedral of Saint Clement of Ohrid in Skopje.

== Protestantism ==
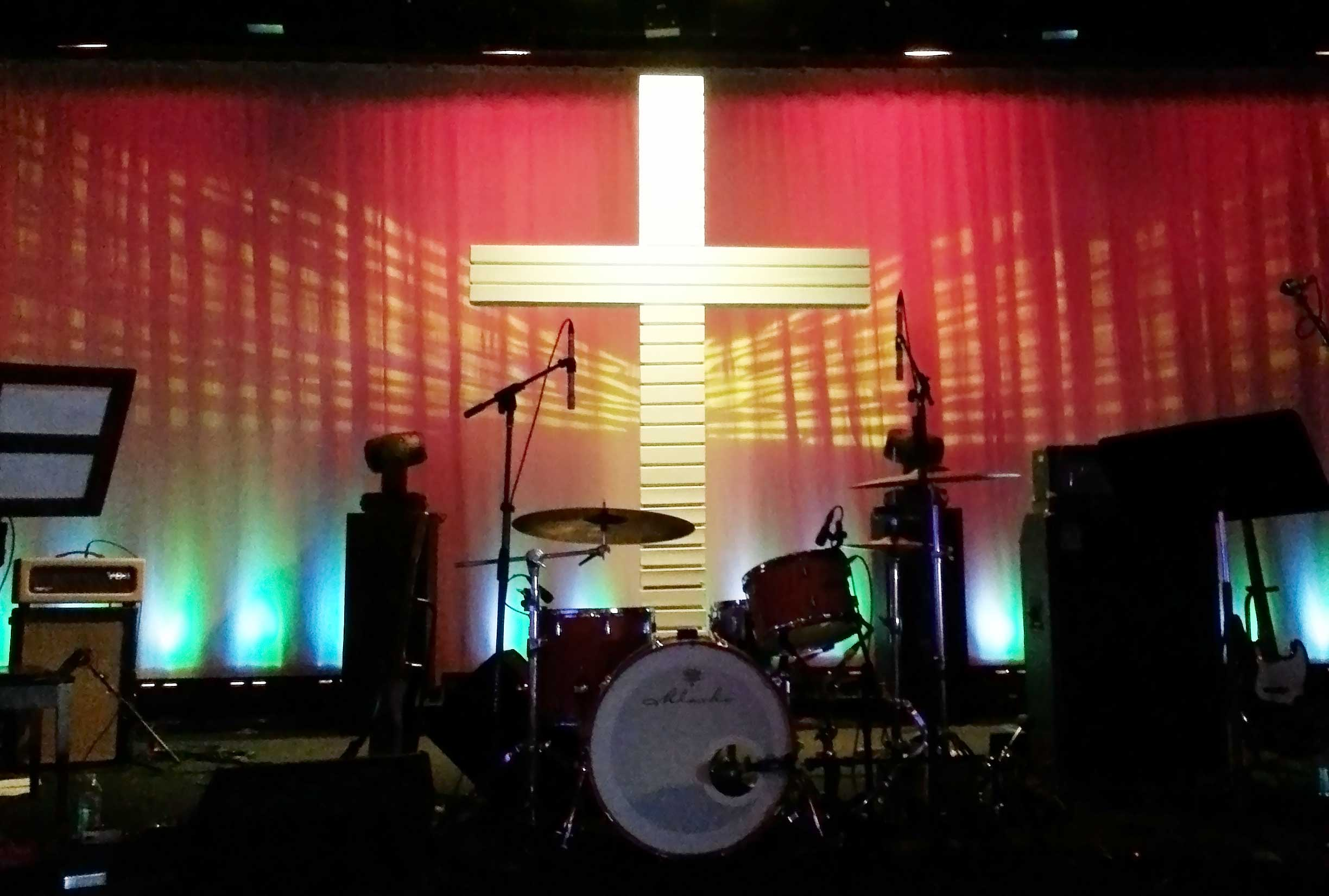
Mars Hill Church, part of the emerging church movement, closed in 2015

=== Megachurches ===
Postmodern Christianity has influenced the emerging church movement, with proponents challenging the mainstream Christianity on issues such as: institutional structures, systematic theology, propositional teaching methods, a perceived preoccupation with buildings, an attractional understanding of mission, professional clergy, and a perceived preoccupation with the political process and unhelpful jargon ("Christian-ese"). Globally, megachurches are a significant development in Protestant Christianity. In the United States, the phenomenon has more than quadrupled in the past two decades. It has since spread worldwide. In 2007, five of the ten largest Protestant churches were in South Korea. The largest megachurch in the United States is Lakewood Church in Houston, Texas with more than 40,000 members every weekend and the current largest megachurch in the world is South Korea's Yoido Full Gospel Church, an Assemblies of God church, with more than 830,000 members as of 2007.

Mark Driscoll, a leader in the emerging church movement, had more than 12,000 followers at Mars Hill Church in Seattle, Washington before controversy led to Driscoll's resignation in 2014 and Mars Hill's dissolution. Like other churches in the emerging church movement, Mars Hill combined alternative worship with Calvinist theology. In 2015, not without controversy, a video featuring Driscoll was featured at a Hillsong Church conference in Sydney, Australia. Hillsong Church is a megachurch, founded in 1983, that has grown to over 100,000 followers. Their 2013 song "Oceans (Where Feet May Fail)" was released and spent 61 weeks atop the Billboard Hot Christian Songs chart, longer than any other song.

Some megachurches, including Lakewood and Yoido Full, teach prosperity theology, a controversial doctrine seen as a heresy by most Christians. In 2007, U.S. Senator Chuck Grassley opened a probe into the finances of six televangelism ministries that promoted prosperity theology: Kenneth Copeland Ministries, Creflo Dollar Ministries, Benny Hinn Ministries, Bishop Eddie Long Ministries, Joyce Meyer Ministries, and Paula White Ministries. In January 2011, Grassley concluded his investigation stating that he believed self-regulation by religious organizations was preferable to government action. Only the ministries led by Meyer and Hinn cooperated with Grassley's investigation. The inauguration of Donald Trump as the 45th President of the United States in 2017 featured prayers from two preachers known for advocating prosperity theology. Paula White, one of Trump's spiritual advisers, gave the invocation.

The heterodox Shincheonji megachurch was the source of the COVID-19 pandemic in South Korea, with most cases in South Korea being tied to the spread of the SARS-CoV-2 virus within the megachurch. On 1 March 2020, Seoul mayor Park Won-soon announced that the Seoul City Government had made a criminal complaint about the church's pastor Lee Man-hee, whom Shincheonji adherents believed to be the messiah, asking for an investigation into him and twelve others connected to the sect on charges of murder by negligence and violations of the Disease Control Act, citing their negligence in preventing an outbreak among their congregants and their refusal to cooperate with the government throughout the crisis.

=== Anglican Communion ===
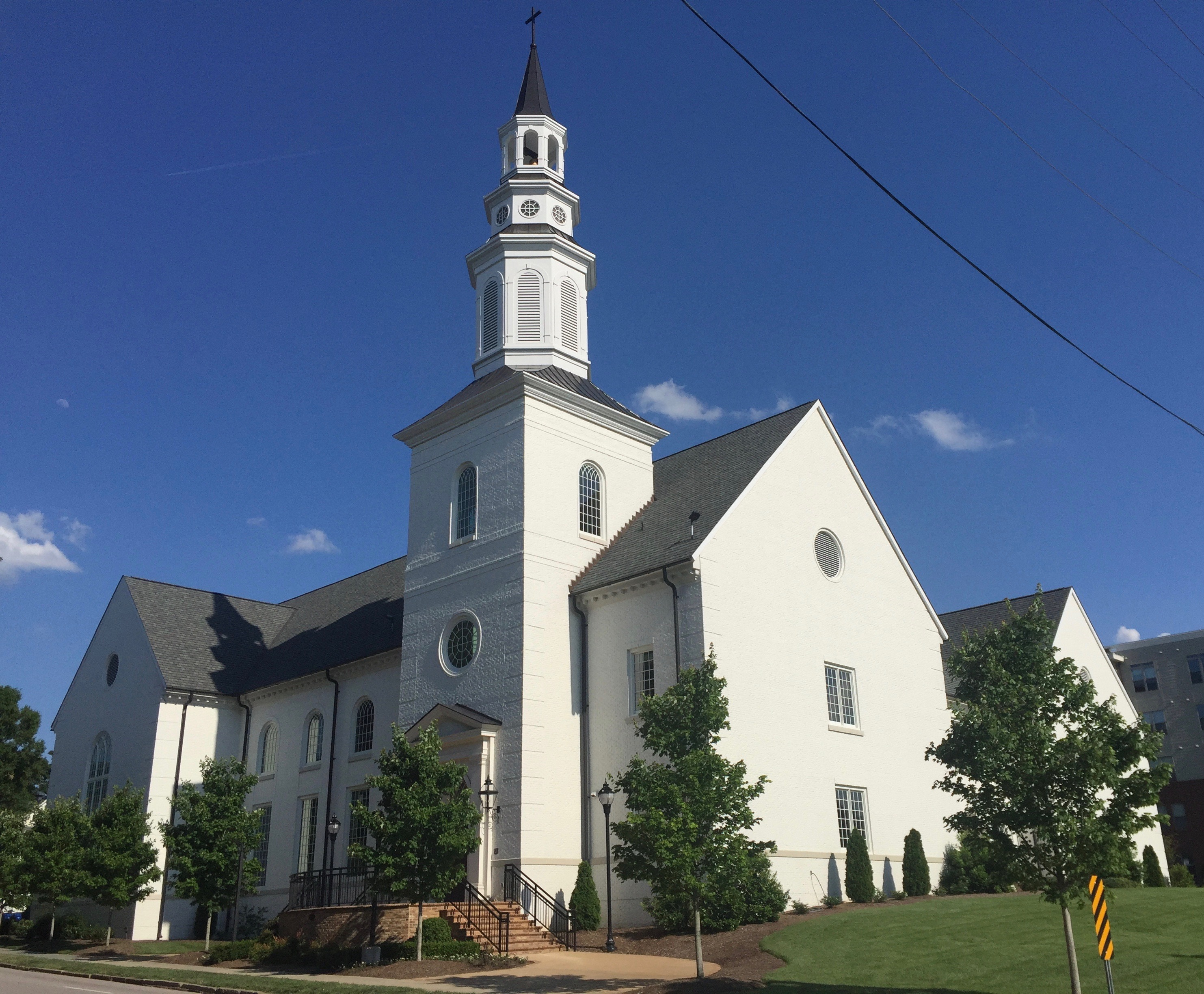
Holy Trinity Anglican Church, an ANCA church built in 2015 in Raleigh, North Carolina

One month prior to the Lambeth Conference, the ten-yearly gathering of Anglican Communion bishops, a seven-day conference of conservative Anglican bishops and leaders held in Jerusalem from 22 to 29 June 2008 to address the growing controversy of the divisions in the Anglican Communion, the rise of secularism, as well as concerns with HIV/AIDS and poverty. As a result of the conference, the Jerusalem Declaration was issued and the Fellowship of Confessing Anglicans was created. The conference participants also called for the creation of the Anglican Church in North America (ANCA), as an alternative to the Episcopal Church in the United States and the Anglican Church of Canada, and declared that recognition by the Archbishop of Canterbury is not necessary to Anglican identity. Follow-up conferences have been held every five years since 2008.

The conventions of four dioceses of the Episcopal Church voted in 2007 and 2008 to leave that church and to join the Anglican Church of the Southern Cone of America. Twelve other jurisdictions, serving an estimated 100,000 persons at that time, formed the ACNA on December 3–4, 2008. The ACNA is seeking official recognition as a province within the Anglican Communion. The Anglican Church of Nigeria declared itself in communion with the new church in March 2009 and the Fellowship of Confessing Anglicans recognized it as well. In June 2009, the Anglican Church of Uganda also declared itself in full communion with ACNA, and the Anglican Church of Sudan followed suit in December 2011.

Two of the major events which contributed to the Anglican realignment were the 2002 decision of the Diocese of New Westminster in Canada to authorise a rite of blessing for same-sex unions, and the nomination of two openly gay priests in 2003 to become bishops. Jeffrey John, an openly gay priest with a long-time partner, was appointed to be the next Bishop of Reading in the Church of England and the General Convention of the Episcopal Church ratified the election of Gene Robinson, an openly gay non-celibate man, as Bishop of New Hampshire. Jeffrey John ultimately declined the appointment due to pressure.

=== United Methodist Church ===
Like many other mainline Protestant denominations in the United States, the United Methodist Church has experienced significant membership losses in recent decades. By the opening of the 2008 General Conference, total UMC membership was estimated at 11.4 million, with about 7.9 million in the US and 3.5 million overseas. Significantly, about 20 percent of the conference delegates were from Africa, with Filipinos and Europeans making up another 10 percent. During the conference, the delegates voted to finalize the induction of the Methodist Church of the Ivory Coast and its 700,000 members into the denomination. One Congolese bishop has estimated that typical Sunday attendance of the UMC is higher in his country than in the entire United States.

Given current trends in the UMC, with overseas churches growing, especially in Africa, and US churches collectively losing about 1,000 members a week, American influence on the UMC is declining. In February 2019, a Special Session of the General Conference of the United Methodist Church was held in St. Louis, Missouri, to examine church teachings on human sexuality. While most American delegates at the General Conference supported the One Church Plan, a resolution that would have made the UMC open and affirming on LGBT issues, allowing individual conferences to allow same-sex marriage and openly gay clergy, the resolution failed. In its place, the Traditional Plan, opposed by most American delegates but supported by the African delegates, was passed by the conference. The Traditional Plan reaffirms traditional teachings on sexuality, penalizes UMC clergy who conduct same-sex marriages or ordain openly gay clergy beginning in 2020.

Some conferences have allowed both same-sex marriage and openly gay clergy for years. One conference in the American Southwest has a lesbian bishop, Karen Oliveto. It is unknown how these clergy will be affected by the rule change. A similar General Conference decision in 1984 led to the early retirement of some openly gay clergy, including Paul Abels. Many progressive clergy have vowed to ignore the new rules if and when they come into effect, and many clergy and congregations are openly contemplating the idea of a schism within the United Methodist Church.

With the Traditional Plan in place, the UMC increasingly saw schism as inevitable and so plans were drawn up to be voted upon at 2020 General Conference. However, due to the coronavirus pandemic, the General Conference was delayed to 2021.

== Internet church ==
The concept of an internet church, utilizing livestreams of services on websites such as YouTube and Zoom, became widespread in the early 2020s. This method of church attendance gained popularity as a result of the COVID-19 pandemic, when in-person church services were interrupted.

== Oriental Orthodoxy ==
=== Coptic Church ===
In April 2006, one person was killed and twelve injured in simultaneous knife attacks on three Coptic churches in Alexandria.

In November 2008, several thousand Muslims attacked a Coptic church in a suburb of Cairo on the day of its inauguration, forcing 800 Coptic Christians to barricade themselves in.

In April 2009, two Christian men were shot dead and another was injured by Muslim men after an Easter vigil in the south of Egypt.

On 18 September 2009, a Muslim man named Osama Araban beheaded a Coptic Christian man in the village of Bagour, and injured 2 others in 2 different villages. He was arrested the following day.

On the eve of 7 January 2010, as worshippers were leaving the Mar-Yuhanna (St. John) church in Nag Hammadi after Eastern Christmas Mass(which finishes around midnight), three Muslim men in a car opened fire, killing 8 Christians and injuring another 10.

On New Year's Day 2011, just 20 minutes after midnight as Christians were leaving a Coptic Orthodox Church in the city of Alexandria after a New Year's Eve service a car bomb exploded in front of the Church killing more than 23 and injuring more than 75.

In Tahrir Square, Cairo, on Wednesday 2 February 2011, Coptic Christians joined hands to provide a protective cordon around their Muslim neighbors during salat (prayers) in the midst of the 2011 Egyptian Revolution.

On 7 May 2011, an armed group of Islamists, including Salafists, attacked and set fire to two churches including Saint Menas Coptic Orthodox Christian Church and the Coptic Church of the Holy Virgin, in Cairo. The attacks resulted in the deaths of 12 people and more than 230 wounded. It is reported that the events were triggered by a mixed marriage between a Christian woman and a Muslim man.

On 17 March 2012, the Coptic Orthodox Pope, Shenouda III died, leaving many Copts mourning and worrying as tensions rose with Muslims. Shenouda III had constantly met with Muslim leaders in order to create peace. Many were worried about Muslims controlling Egypt, as the Muslim Brotherhood had won 70% of the parliamentary elections. Tawadros II was elected Pope on 4 November 2012.

In February 2015, twenty-one Coptic Christians were kidnapped and beheaded in Libya by ISIS insurgents. Six days later, they were canonized as martyrs by Pope Tawadros II.

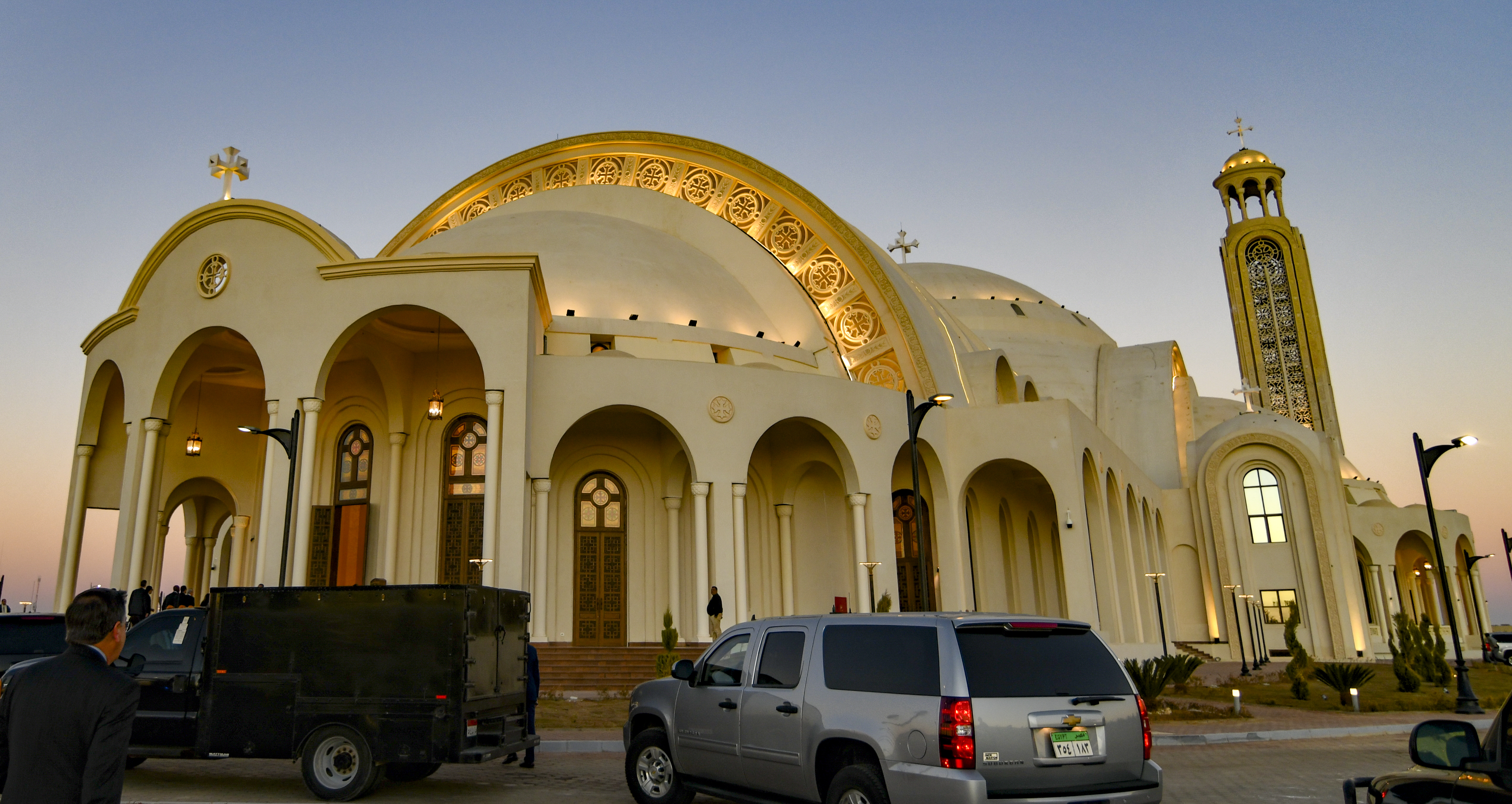
Cathedral of the Nativity in Cairo, the largest church in the Middle East, consecrated in 2019

In January 2017, following twin terrorist attacks that killed at least 27 Coptic Egyptians at St. Peter and St. Paul's Church in Cairo in December 2016, the President of Egypt Abdel Fattah el-Sisi commissioned the construction of the country's largest mosque and church in the new administrative capital to become symbols of coexistence and national unity. For decades, the building of churches in Egypt was restricted to avoid offending Islam. The Cathedral of the Nativity in Cairo was inaugurated on 6 January 2019 by President el-Sisi and Pope Tawadros II. On the same day of the inauguration, Divine Liturgy was celebrated in the chapel of the cathedral with the participation of some 3,000 people that included representatives from all over the country.

=== Armenian Church ===
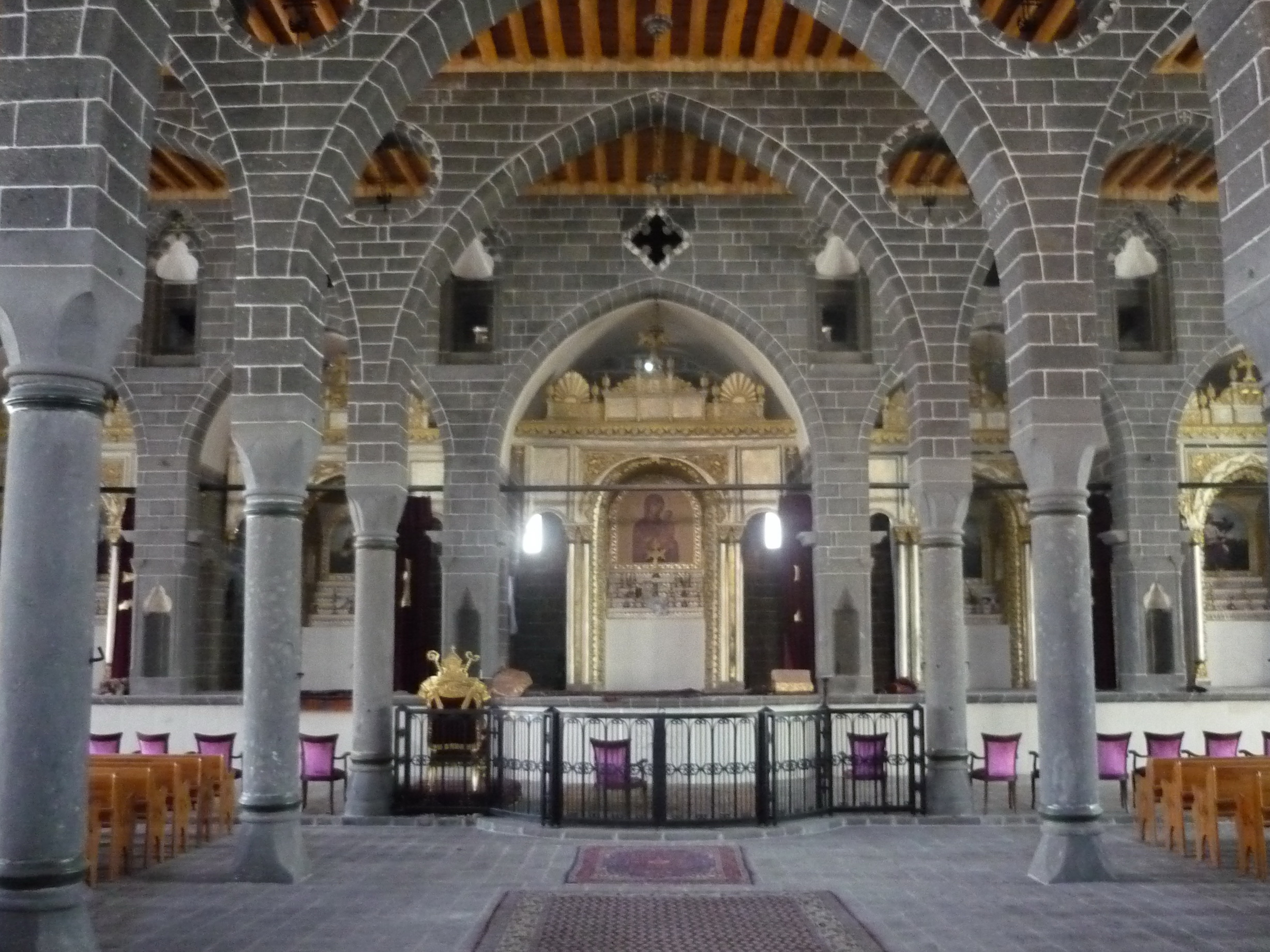
St. Giragos Armenian Church in Turkey, restored and reopened in 2011, reconfiscated by the Turkish government in 2016, and reopened again in 2022.

The construction of the Holy Mother of God Cathedral in Stepanakert, Nagorno-Karabakh began in 2006 and was completed in 2019. The cathedral was demolished in April 2026 by Azerbaijan.

In October 2013 Father Asoghik Karapetyan, the director of the Museum of the Mother See of Holy Etchmiadzin, stated on television that an atheist Armenian is not a "true Armenian". A spokesperson for the Armenian Apostolic Church stated that it is his personal view. The statement received considerable criticism, though Asoghik did not retract his statement. In an editorial in the liberal Aravot daily Aram Abrahamyan suggested that religious identity should not be equated with national (ethnic) identity and it is up to every individual to decide whether they are Armenian or not, regardless of religion. According to a 2018 survey by the Pew Research Center, in Armenia 82% of respondents say it is very or somewhat important to be a Christian to be truly Armenian.

On 24 April 2015, the Armenian Apostolic Church canonized all of the victims of the Armenian genocide as martyrs, which began a hundred years prior to the following day on 24 April 1915; this service is believed to be the largest canonization service in history. It was the first canonization by the Armenian Apostolic Church in four hundred years.

On 26 September 2017, a deaconess was consecrated in the Tehran Diocese of the Armenian Apostolic Church, the first Armenian deaconess in a hundred years.

On 3 October 2019, Turkish newspaper Hürriyet reported on a 2012 lawsuit advancing through Turkish courts; the lawsuit was filed by Patriarch Nourhan Manougian of Jerusalem in an attempt to reclaim patriarchate property confiscated by the Turkish government during the Armenian genocide in 1915. According to Patriarch Manougian, the "Armenian Patriarchate in Jerusalem owned around 1,200 properties in Istanbul alone" prior to the genocide. The court had originally dismissed the case in 2012, despite the patriarchate winning an appeal, but a decision from the Constitutional Court of Turkey ruled on 12 September 2019 that the previous court had violated the rights of the patriarchate.

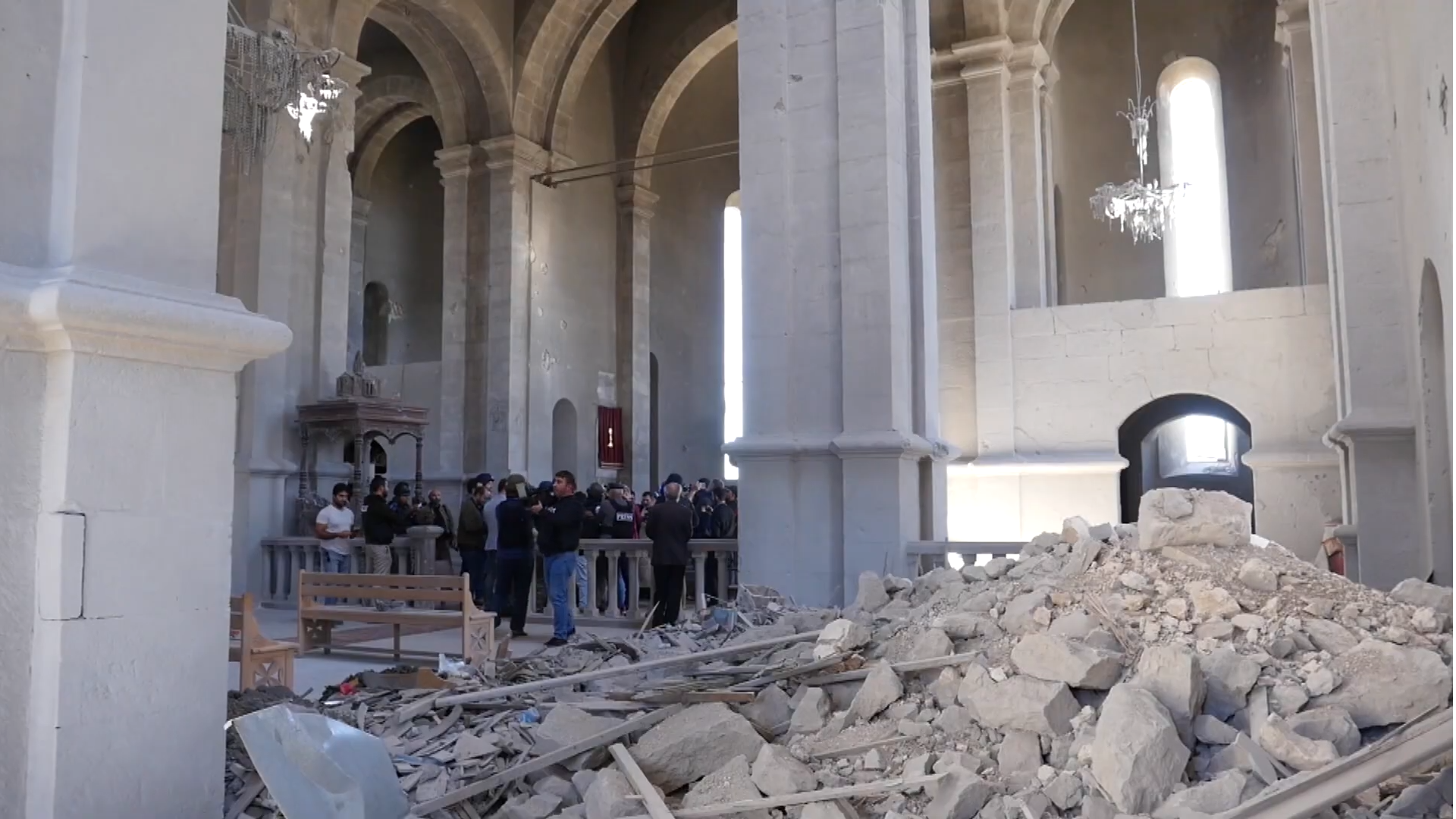
A wedding held at Ghazanchetsots Cathedral after the church was bombed by Azerbaijani forces in 2020

Amidst the Second Nagorno-Karabakh War, on 8 October 2020, the mother church of Artsakhtsi Christians Ghazanchetsots Cathedral in Shushi was bombed by the Azerbaijani Armed Forces. Archbishop Pargev Martirosyan of Artsakh compared the shelling with the actions of Islamic State of Iraq and the Levant, saying "They are bombarding our spiritual values, when we are restoring and preserving mosques". Another priest at the cathedral said "I feel the pain that the walls of our beautiful cathedral are destroyed. I feel the pain that today the world does not react to what's happening here and that our boys are dying defending our Motherland".

=== Ethiopian Church ===
Patriarch Abune Paulos died on 16 August 2012, followed four days later by Ethiopian Prime Minister Meles Zenawi. On 28 February 2013, a college of electors assembled in Addis Ababa and elected Abune Mathias to be the 6th Patriarch of the Ethiopian Orthodox Church.

On 25 July 2018, delegates from the Patriarchate in Addis Ababa, Ethiopia and those in the United States, declared reunification in Washington, D.C., with the assistance of Ethiopian Prime Minister Abiy Ahmed. Declaring the end of a 26 year old schism, which began in 1991 when the Ethiopian People's Revolutionary Democratic Front seized power in Ethiopia and exiled the patriarch, the Church announced that it now acknowledges two patriarchs: Abune Merkorios, the 4th Patriarch of Ethiopia, and Abune Mathias, the 6th Patriarch of Ethiopia.

=== Eritrean Church ===
The first Patriarch of the newly independent Eritrean Orthodox Tewahedo Church, Abune Phillipos, died in 2002 and was succeeded by Abune Yacob. The reign of Abune Yacob as Patriarch of Eritrea was very brief as he died not long after his enthronement, and he was succeeded by Abune Antonios as the 3rd Patriarch of Eritrea. Abune Antonios was elected on 5 March 2004, and enthroned as the third Patriarch of Eritrea on 24 April 2004. Coptic Pope Shenouda III of Alexandria presided at the ceremony in Asmara, together with the Holy Synod of the Eritrean Orthodox Church and a Coptic Orthodox Church delegation.

In August 2005, Abune Antonios, the Patriarch of the Eritrean Orthodox Tewahedo Church, was confined to a strictly ceremonial role. In a letter dated 13 January 2006, Patriarch Abune Antonios was informed that following several sessions of the church's Holy Synod, he had been formally deposed. In a written response that was widely published, the Patriarch rejected the grounds of his dismissal, questioned the legitimacy of the synod, and excommunicated two signatories to the 13 January 2006 letter, including Yoftahe Dimetros, whom the Patriarch identified as being responsible for the church's recent upheavals. Patriarch Antonios also appealed his case to the Council of the Monasteries of the Eritrean Orthodox Church and to the Coptic Orthodox Church of Alexandria. Abune Antonios was deposed by the Eritrean Holy Synod supposedly under pressure from the Eritrean government and he remains under house arrest. Abuna Antonios was replaced by Abune Dioskoros as the 4th Patriarch of Eritrea. Many believe that Abune Antonios was wrongly deposed and still consider him Patriarch. Many Eritrean Orthodox followers disagree with the Eritrean government making decisions in religious matters. The ruling Patriarch Abune Dioskoros died on 21 December 2015. His seat remained vacant until 2021 when he was succeeded by Abune Qerlos.

== Assyrian Church ==
After the fall of Mosul, the Islamic State of Iraq and the Levant demanded that Assyrian Christians living in the city convert to Islam, pay tribute, or face execution, by 19 July 2014. Al-Baghdadi further noted that Christians who do not agree to follow those terms must "leave the borders of the Islamic Caliphate" within a specified deadline. This resulted in a complete Assyrian Christian exodus from Mosul, marking the end of 1,600 years of continuous Christian presence. A church mass was not held in Mosul for the first time in 1,800 years. On 9 July 2017, Iraqi Prime Minister Haider Al-Abadi arrived in preparation to announce the full liberation of Mosul and reclaim the city after three years of ISIL control.

== Ecumenical dialogue ==
=== Catholic–Armenian ===
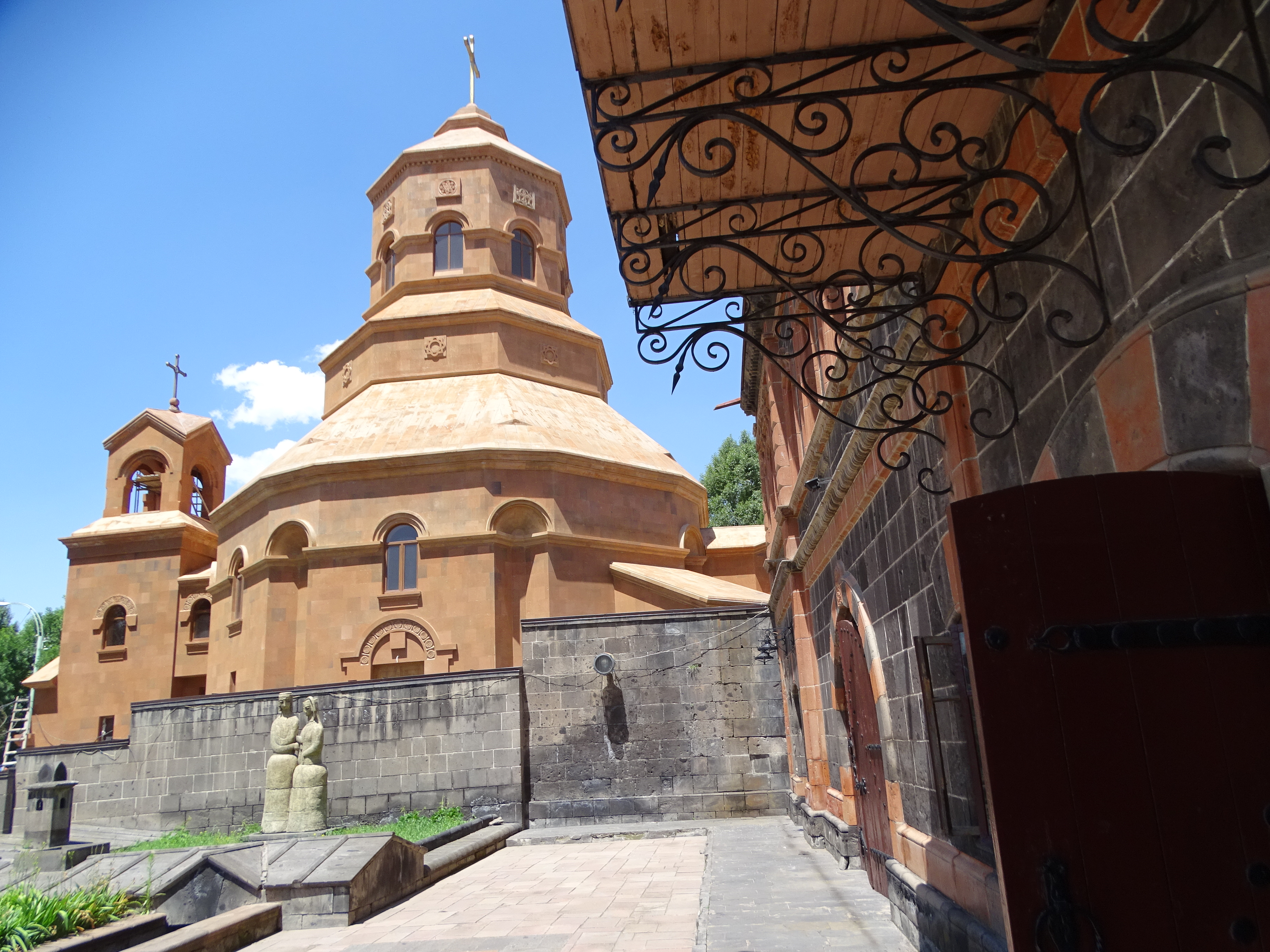
Cathedral of the Holy Martyrs in Gyumri, Armenia, an Armenian Catholic cathedral dedicated in 2015 to the martyrs of the Armenian Genocide

On 18 February 2001, Pope John Paul II during his Angelus address commemorated the 1,700th anniversary of the baptism of the Armenian people and referred to St. Gregory of Narek (Armenian: Գրիգոր Նարեկացի) as "the great doctor of the Armenian Church." In September 2001, John Paul II traveled to Armenia and participated in an ecumenical liturgy at the newly consecrated Cathedral of St. Gregory the Illuminator in Yerevan.

On 12 April 2015, on Divine Mercy Sunday, during a Mass for the centennial of the Armenian genocide at St. Peter's Basilica, Pope Francis officially proclaimed St. Gregory of Narek as a Doctor of the Church in attendance of Armenian President Serzh Sargsyan, Catholicos of All Armenians Karekin II, Catholicos of Cilicia Aram I, and Armenian Catholic Patriarch Nerses Bedros XIX Tarmouni. He became the 36th and the first Armenian Doctor of the Church. He is also the only Doctor "who was not in communion with the Catholic Church during his lifetime."

Cathedral of the Holy Martyrs (Armenian: Սրբոց Նահատակաց եկեղեցի) in Gyumri, Armenia, the cathedral for the Armenian Catholic Ordinariate for Armenia, Georgia, Russia, and Eastern Europe was consecrated by Krikor Bedros XX Gabroyan, Catholicos-Patriarch of the Armenian Catholic Church, and Cardinal Leonardo Sandri, Prefect of the Congregation for the Oriental Churches, on 24 September 2015. The ceremony was held as part of the commemoration of the centennial of the Armenian Genocide. The cathedral is named "Holy Martyrs" in memory of victims of the Armenian Genocide, as the Armenian Apostolic Church canonized them as martyrs. On 25 June 2016, Pope Francis, accompanied by Catholicos Karekin II, visited the cathedral.

On 26 June 2016, Catholicos Karekin II and Pope Francis signed a joint declaration on the family. It stated that the secularization of society and its "alienation from the spiritual and divine" are damaging to the family, and affirmed that the Catholic and Armenian Apostolic churches share a marriage–based view of the family. The declaration also took note of various positive steps taken towards unity between the two leaders' churches, and "acknowledged the successful 'new phase' in relations" between them. It also lamented "immense tragedy" of the widespread persecution of Christians in the Middle East; the Pope and the Catholicos prayed "for a change of heart in all those who commit such crimes and those who are in a position to stop the violence".

On 5 April 2018, a two-meter-high bronze statue of St. Gregory of Narek, erected by Davit Yerevantsi, was unveiled at the Vatican Gardens by Mikael Minasyan, Armenia's Ambassador to the Holy See. The inaugural ceremony was attended by Pope Francis, Armenian President Serzh Sargsyan, Armenian Apostolic catholicoi Karekin II and Aram I. In September 2018, Archbishop Khajag Barsamian was appointed in early September as the first-ever representative of the Apostolic Armenian Church to the Holy See.

=== Coptic–Greek ===
In the summer of 2001, the Coptic Orthodox Church of Alexandria and Greek Orthodox Patriarchate of Alexandria agreed to mutually recognize baptisms performed in each other's churches, making re-baptisms unnecessary, and to recognize the sacrament of marriage as celebrated by the other.

=== Catholic–Anglican ===
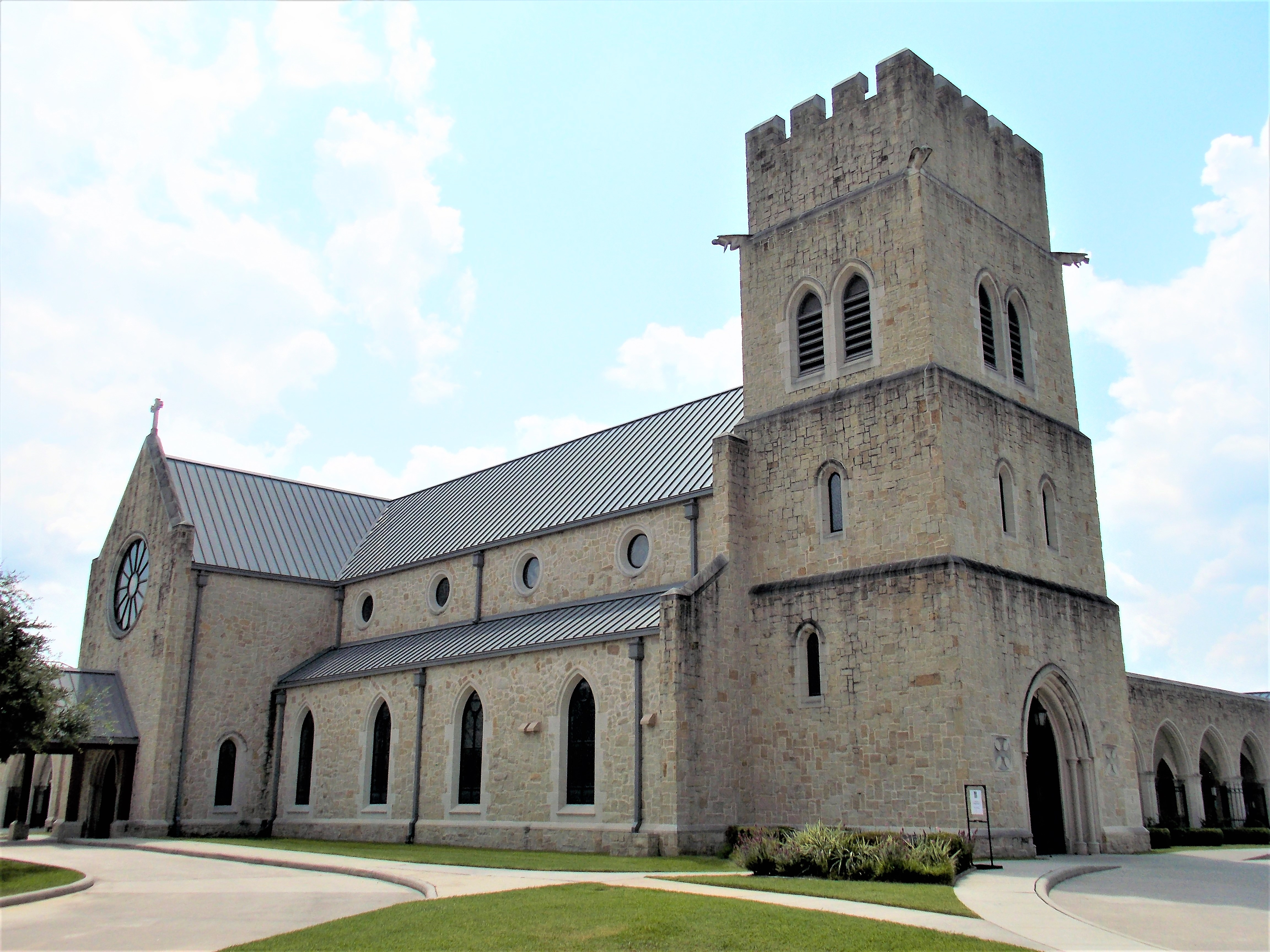
Our Lady of Walsingham in Houston, Texas, the mother church of the Personal Ordinariate of the Chair of Saint Peter, elevated to the status of cathedral in 2015 when Steven J. Lopes became the first bishop of the ordinariate

Pope John Paul II officially called off all future talks between the Catholic Church and the Anglican Communion upon the consecration of Gene Robinson as a bishop in 2003. In conversation with the Anglican Bishop of Gibraltar, Cardinal Walter Kasper, president of the Pontifical Council for Promoting Christian Unity, warned that if the Church of England was to ordain women as bishops, as the Episcopal Church had already done, then it could destroy any chance of reuniting the Catholic and Anglican churches. In December 2014, Libby Lane was announced as the first woman to become a bishop in the Church of England. She was consecrated as a bishop in January 2015. In July 2015, Rachel Treweek was the first woman to become a diocesan bishop in the Church of England when she became the Bishop of Gloucester. She and Sarah Mullally, Bishop of Crediton, were the first women to be ordained as bishops at Canterbury Cathedral. Treweek later made headlines by calling for gender-inclusive language, saying that "God is not to be seen as male. God is God."

In late 2009, in response to requests from various groups of Anglicans around the world who were dissatisfied with liberalizing movements within the Anglican Communion, Pope Benedict XVI issued the apostolic constitution Anglicanorum Coetibus. This document invites groups of traditionalist Anglicans to form what are termed "Anglican ordinariates" or "personal ordinariates" under the ecclesiastical jurisdiction of the Catholic Church, while preserving elements of the liturgical, musical, theological and other aspects of their Anglican patrimony. Under these terms, regional groupings of Anglican Catholics may apply for reception by the Holy See under the jurisdiction of an "ordinary" (i.e. a bishop or priest (Note: In the Catholic Church in general, ordinaries are supposed to be bishops, or at least episcopal vicars, but this condition was relaxed for Anglican ordinariates so as to allow married former Anglican bishops to become ordinaries: while priests in Anglican ordinariates may be married, bishops may not, as this is the general rule in both Catholic and Orthodox churches. Therefore, married Anglican bishops or priests converting to Catholicism receive the priestly ordination, and may not become Catholic bishops afterwards.)) appointed by Rome to oversee the community. While being in a country or region which is part of the Latin Church of the Catholic Church, these ordinaries will nonetheless retain aspects of the Anglican patrimony, such as married priests and traditional English choral music and liturgy.

As of 2013, marrying a Catholic no longer disqualifies a person from succeeding to the British Crown. The explanation published when the bill had been introduced mentioned that those who had lost their places in the line of succession by marrying a Catholic would regain their places, but that those "with a realistic prospect of succeeding to the Throne" would not be affected. The first person in the new line of succession to be affected by this change when it came into effect was George Windsor, Earl of St Andrews, who had married a Catholic in 1988, and was restored to the line of succession in 34th place, after his father the Duke of Kent, although his Catholic children remain excluded. The provision of the Act of Settlement requiring the monarch to be a Protestant continues, as the monarch remains the Supreme Governor of the Church of England.

On 13 October 2019, Pope Francis canonized Saint John Henry Newman, a London-born priest who led the Oxford Movement in the Church of England before converting to Catholicism and becoming an Oratorian Father and eventually the Cardinal-Deacon of San Giorgio in Velabro. Newman is the first Englishman who has lived since the 17th century to be officially recognised as a saint by the Catholic Church. In attendance at the canonization ceremony in St. Peter Square was Charles, Prince of Wales, who in 2022 would become king and Supreme Governor of the Church of England.

=== Catholic–Orthodox ===
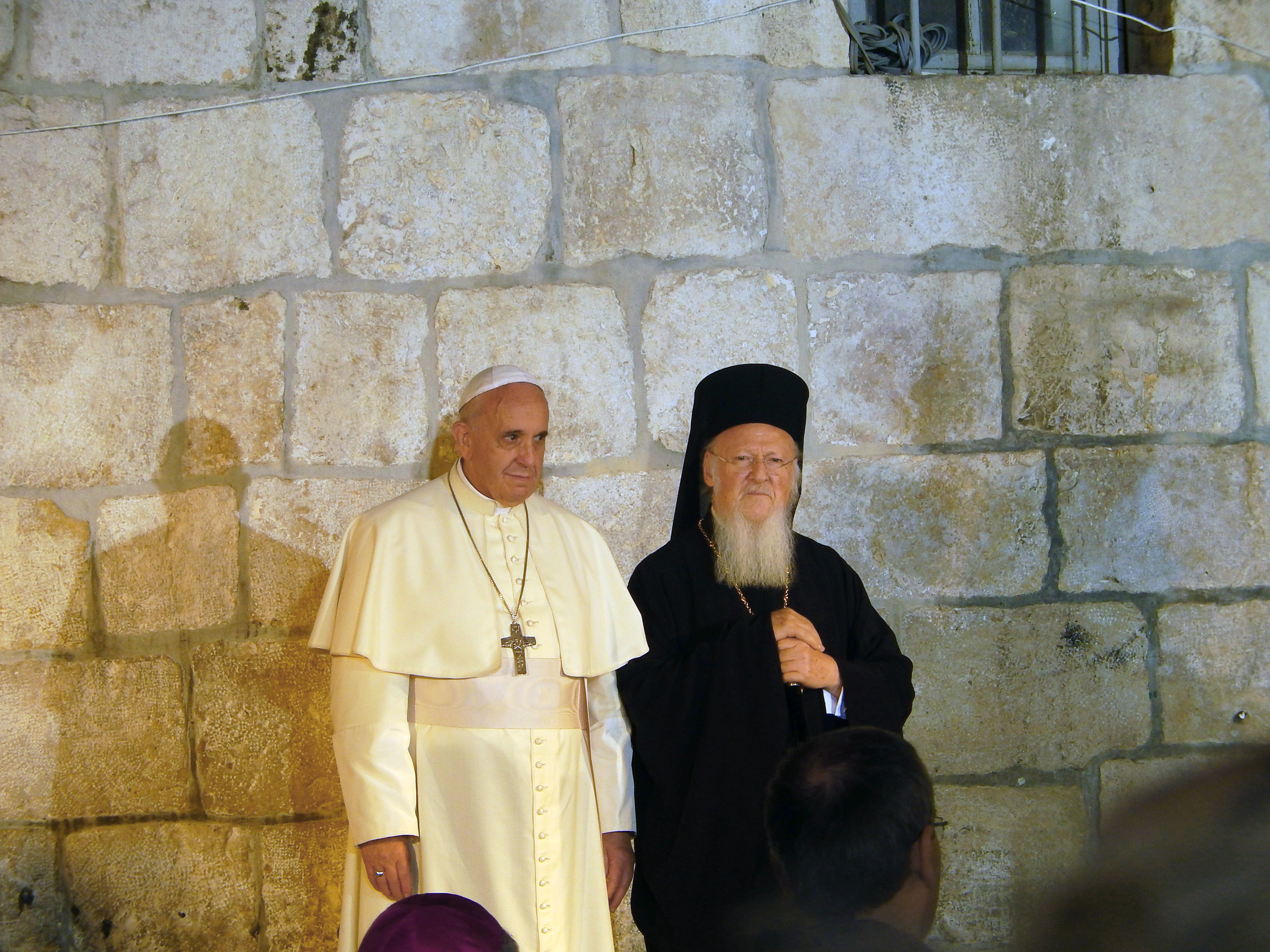
Pope Francis and Patriarch Bartholomew in the Church of the Holy Sepulchre in Jerusalem.

In June 2004, the Ecumenical Patriarch Bartholomew I's visit to Rome afforded a meeting with Pope John Paul II, for conversations with the Pontifical Council for Promoting Christian Unity and for taking part in the celebration for the feast day in St. Peter's Basilica. Some of the bones of Saints Gregory the Theologian and John Chrysostom, which were looted from Constantinople by the Fourth Crusade in 1204, were returned to the Church of St George, Istanbul by Pope John Paul II.

The Ravenna Document in 2007 re-stated the notion that the Bishop of Rome is indeed the first (Greek: πρώτος, romanized: protos) among the patriarchs, although future discussions are to be held on the concrete ecclesiological exercise of papal primacy.

Patriarch Bartholomew attended the papal inauguration of Pope Francis on 19 March 2013, paving the way for better Catholic–Orthodox relations. It was the first time that the spiritual head of Eastern Orthodox Christians had attended a papal inauguration since the Great Schism in 1054. After, he invited Pope Francis to travel with him to the Holy Land in 2014 to mark the fiftieth anniversary of the embrace between Patriarch Athenagoras and Pope Paul VI.

On 12 February 2016, Pope Francis and Patriarch Kirill of Moscow met in a VIP room at José Martí International Airport near Havana, Cuba. Francis arrived at 2 pm local time, and the two leaders embraced and kissed. A 2-hour private meeting was followed by the signing of a joint declaration, which had been prepared in advance. The 30-point declaration contained a joint call by the two church primates for an end to the persecution of Christians in the Middle East and to wars in the region, expressing their hope that the meeting might contribute to the re-establishment of Christian unity between the two churches. A range of other issues are mentioned in the declaration, including atheism, secularism, consumerism, migrants and refugees, the importance of marriage and the family, and concerns relating to abortion and euthanasia.

On 3 July 2019, it was revealed that during a Vatican meeting with Orthodox Archbishop Job of Telmessos, who represented the Ecumenical Patriarch Bartholomew of Constantinople, during the feast of Sts. Peter and Paul on 29 June 2019, Pope Francis stated that unity rather than leveling differences should be the goal between the Catholic and Orthodox Churches. Pope Francis also gave Bartholomew nine bone fragments which were believed to have belonged to Saint Peter and which were displayed at a public Mass which was held in the Vatican in November 2013 to celebrate the Year of Faith. Despite holding a "cordial" meeting with Russian President Vladimir Putin, with whom the Pope has had a history of good relations, on 4 July 2019, tensions between the Vatican and Russian Orthodox churches still remained, with Pope Francis stating that it is unlikely that he will visit Russia unless Putin agrees to not include the Russian Orthodox Church in the visit. Putin also stated to the Pope that he would not invite the Pope to Russia without this condition. Pope Francis also hinted that was willing to support the concerns of Ukrainian Greek Catholic Church, which has expressed opposition to both Putin's intervention in Ukraine and the Vatican's current relationship with Putin. At the beginning of a two-day Vatican meeting with Ukrainian Greek-Catholic leaders on 5 July 2019, Pope Francis hinted that he supported the Church's concerns in Ukraine and called for greater humanitarian aid to Ukraine.

On 12 November 2019, Patriarch Bartholomew, the Abbot of Xenophontos and a hieromonk from Pantokratoros Monastery on Mount Athos participated in a Vespers service at the Abbey of Notre-Dame de Saint-Rémy, a Trappist Catholic monastery. Upon returning with the abbots to Mount Athos, Bartholomew gave a speech at Pantokratoros Monastery declaring that union with the Catholic Church is inevitable as no theological differences exist between the churches and only historical differences have kept the two churches from union.

=== Catholic–Lutheran ===
In 2016, on the 499th anniversary of the start of the Protestant Reformation, Pope Francis travelled to Sweden (where the Lutheran Church is the national Church) to commemorate the Reformation at Lund Cathedral, which serves as the seat for the Lutheran Bishop of Lund. An official press release from the Holy See stated:

The Lutheran World Federation (LWF) and Roman Catholic Church joint event will highlight the 50 years of continuous ecumenical dialogue between Catholics and Lutherans and the joint gifts of this collaboration. The Catholic-Lutheran commemoration of 500 years of the Reformation is structured around the themes of thanksgiving, repentance and commitment to common witness. The aim is to express the gifts of the Reformation and ask forgiveness for division perpetuated by Christians from the two traditions.

An ecumenical service was presided over by Munib Younan, the president of the Lutheran World Federation, Martin Junge, the General Secretary of the LWF, as well as Pope Francis. Representatives from the Anglican Communion, Baptist World Alliance, Eastern Orthodox Church, and Salvation Army also participated in the predominantly Catholic and Lutheran event. Pope Francis, in a joint statement with Munib Younan, stated that "With gratitude we acknowledge that the Reformation helped give a greater centrality to sacred Scripture in the Church's life".

=== Catholic–Coptic ===
On 28 April 2017, Pope Francis and Coptic Pope Tawadros ll agreed that they would not require re-baptism for Catholics who seek to join the Coptic Orthodox Church, and vice versa. The Catholic Church baptizes by affusion (pouring) and the Coptic Orthodox Church baptizes by immersion, but this declaration means that the two churches recognize each other's baptisms as a valid sacrament.

== Timeline ==
21st century timeline
- 2001 – New Tribes Missionaries Martin and Gracia Burnham are kidnapped in the Philippines by Muslim terrorist group
- 2002 – The Boston Globe publishes results of child sex abuse investigation implicating five priests from the Archdiocese of Boston
- 2003 – Mission Province splits from Church of Sweden over ordination of women
- 2003 – Gene Robinson becomes first openly gay non-celibate Episcopalian bishop and Anglican realignment begins in reaction
- 2004 – Four Southern Baptist missionaries are killed by gunman in Iraq
- 2005 – Death of Pope John Paul II, election of Pope Benedict XVI
- 2005 – United Church of Christ becomes first protestant denomination to support same-sex marriage
- 2006 – Missionary Vijay Kumar is publicly stoned by Hindu extremists for Christian preaching
- 2006 – Legion of Christ begins to rapidly decline following the disgrace of its founder Marcial Maciel
- 2006 – Palestinian Christian churches issue Jerusalem Declaration on Christian Zionism, a joint statement condemning Christian Zionism as heresy
- 2007 – Kriol Bible completed, the first translation of the entire Bible into an Australian indigenous language
- 2007 – Pope Benedict XVI issues motu proprio Summorum Pontificum, allowing priests to celebrate the Tridentine Mass without permission from bishop
- 2007 – Russian Orthodox Church reunifies after 80 years of schism with Russian Orthodox Church Outside Russia a formerly True Orthodox sect.
- 2008 – Death of Patriarch Alexy II of Moscow, election of Patriarch Kirill
- 2009 – Anglican Church in North America splits from Episcopal Church over LGBT issues
- 2009 – Pope Benedict XVI issues apostolic constitution Anglicanorum coetibus, establishing personal ordinariates for Anglican Use Catholics
- 2012 – ECO: A Covenant Order of Evangelical Presbyterians splits from Presbyterian Church (USA) over LGBT issues
- 2012 – Death of Coptic Pope Shenouda III of Alexandria, election of Pope Tawadros II
- 2013 – Resignation of Pope Benedict XVI, election of Pope Francis
- 2014 – No Mass is said in Mosul for the first time in 1,600 years due to the city's fall to ISIL
- 2015 – 21 Copts kidnapped and beheaded by ISIL in Libya, canonized as martyrs by Coptic Pope Tawadros II
- 2015 – Catholicos Karekin II canonizes 1.5 million Armenians killed in Armenian genocide as martyrs
- 2015 – 9 churchgoers murdered at historically black church in Charleston church shooting by white supremacist
- 2016 – Catholics commemorate Extraordinary Jubilee of Mercy
- 2016 – 75 churchgoers killed in Easter church bombing in Pakistan carried out by Taliban
- 2016 – U.S. Supreme Court sides with Little Sisters of the Poor in Zubik v. Burwell, exempting religious groups from Obamacare contraceptive mandate
- 2017 – Catholic Church and Coptic Church recognize shared baptism
- 2017 – Mosul is retaken by Iraqi security forces, Christian community returns to city
- 2018 – Russian Orthodox Church breaks ties with the Ecumenical Patriarchate of Constantinople
- 2018 – Unification of Ukrainian Orthodox churches in defiance of Moscow patriarchate amidst Russo-Ukrainian War
- 2019 – 259 churchgoers murdered in Sri Lanka Easter bombings
- 2020 – Churches close temporarily and launch digital church services due to COVID-19 pandemic
- 2022 – Global Methodist Church splits from United Methodist Church over LGBT issues
- 2025 – Catholics commemorate 2025 Jubilee
- 2025 – Death of Pope Francis, election of Pope Leo XIV
- 2026 – Society of St. Pius X is excommunicated after consecrating four new bishops, largest schism in over 150 years

== See also ==
- Genocide of Christians by ISIL
- Impact of the COVID-19 pandemic on the Catholic Church
- History of Christianity
- History of Eastern Orthodox Churches in the 20th century
- History of Protestantism
- History of the Roman Catholic Church#Catholicism today
- History of Christian theology#Postmodern Christianity
- Timeline of Christianity#21st century
- Timeline of Christian missions#2000 to present
- Timeline of the Roman Catholic Church#21st century

== Notes ==
History of Christianity: Modern Christianity
Preceded by: Christianity in the 20th century / 21st century / Theology of the Last Things in Christianity
BC	C1	C2	C3	C4	C5	C6	C7	C8	C9	C10
C11	C12	C13	C14	C15	C16	C17	C18	C19	C20	C21
