= List of current popes and patriarchs =

This is a list of current Christian popes and patriarchs.

== Pope and patriarchs in the Catholic Church ==
| See | Bishop | Election |
|---|---|---|
| Rome | Pope Leo XIV | 2025 |
| Alexandria of the Copts | Patriarch Ibrahim Isaac Sidrak | 2013 |
| Antioch of the Syriacs | Patriarch Mar Ignatius Joseph III Yonan | 2009 |
| Antioch of the Maronites | Patriarch Bechara Boutros Cardinal al-Rahi | 2011 |
| Antioch, Alexandria & Jerusalem of the Greek Melkites | Patriarch Youssef Absi | 2017 |
| Chaldean Catholic Patriarchs of Baghdad | Paul III Nona | 2026 |
| Cilicia of the Armenians | Catholicos-Patriarch Raphaël Bedros XXI Minassian | 2021 |

In 2006, Benedict XVI renounced the title of "Patriarch of the West" (Patriarcha Occidentis). In 2024, Pope Francis reinstated the title to bring closer ties to the other Patriarchs in the Eastern Orthodox faith.

=== Patriarchs in the Latin Church ===
The patriarchates in the lower table are in the Latin Church; whose bearers have the title of patriarch for various historical reasons, but who lack a particular church sui iuris.

| See | Bishop | Election |
|---|---|---|
| Venice | Patriarch Francesco Moraglia | 2012 |
| West Indies | Vacant since 31 August 1963 | |
| Lisbon | Patriarch Rui Manuel Sousa Valério | 2023 |
| East Indies | Patriarch Filipe Neri António Sebastião do Rosário Ferrão | 2004 |
| Jerusalem | Patriarch Pierbattista Pizzaballa | 2020 |

== Patriarch of the Assyrian Church of the East ==
| See | Bishop | Election |
|---|---|---|
| Assyrian Church of the East | Catholicos-Patriarch Mar Awa III | 2021 |

== Patriarch of the Ancient Church of the East ==
| See | Bishop | Election |
|---|---|---|
| Ancient Church of the East | Catholicos-Patriarch Gewargis III Younan | 2022 |

== Patriarchs in the Eastern Orthodox Church ==
| See | Bishop | Election |
|---|---|---|
| Constantinople | Ecumenical Patriarch Bartholomew I | 1991 |
| Alexandria | Pope and Patriarch Theodore II | 2004 |
| Antioch | Patriarch John X | 2012 |
| Jerusalem | Patriarch Theophilos III | 2005 |
| Moscow | Patriarch Kirill | 2009 |
| Georgia | Catholicos-Patriarch Shio III | 2026 |
| Serbia | Patriarch Porfirije | 2021 |
| Romania | Patriarch Daniel | 2007 |
| Bulgaria | Patriarch Daniel | 2024 |

== Patriarchs of independent Eastern Orthodox Churches ==
=== Patriarch of the Ukrainian Orthodox Church – Kyiv Patriarchate ===
| See | Bishop | Election |
|---|---|---|
| Kyiv | Patriarch Nykodym | 2026 |

=== Patriarch of the Russian Old-Orthodox Church ===
| See | Bishop | Election |
|---|---|---|
| Moscow | Patriarch Alexander | 2002 |

=== Patriarch of the Turkish Orthodox Church ===
| See | Bishop | Election |
|---|---|---|
| Istanbul | Papa Eftim IV | 2002 |

== Pope and patriarchs in the Oriental Orthodox Churches ==
| See | Bishop | Election |
|---|---|---|
| Alexandria | Pope Tawadros II | 2012 |
| Antioch | Patriarch Ignatius Aphrem II | 2014 |
| Armenia | Patriarch and Catholicos Karekin II | 1999 |
| Ethiopia | Patriarch Catholicos Abune Mathias | 2013 |
| Eritrea | Patriarch Basilos | 2024 |
| Cilicia (Armenian) | Patriarch and Catholicos Aram I | 1995 |
| Jerusalem (Armenian) | Patriarch Nourhan | 2013 |
| Constantinople (Armenian) | Patriarch Sahak II Mashalian | 2019 |

== Patriarchs of independent Oriental Orthodox Churches ==
=== Patriarch of the British Orthodox Church ===
| See | Bishop | Election |
|---|---|---|
| Glastonbury | Patriarch Jacobus III | 2025 |

== Popes and patriarchs of Independent Catholic Churches ==
=== Patriarch of the Apostolic Catholic Church ===
| See | Bishop | Election |
|---|---|---|
| Philippines | Patriarch Juan Almario Calampiano | 2021 |

=== Pope of the Palmarian Catholic Church ===
| See | Bishop | Election |
|---|---|---|
| El Palmar de Troya | Pope Peter III | 2016 |

=== Pope of Ordo Militaris, Inc. ===
| See | Bishop | Election |
|---|---|---|
| Rome | Hildebrand | 2025 |

=== Patriarch of the Ukrainian Orthodox Greek Catholic Church ===
| See | Bishop | Election |
|---|---|---|
| Pidhirtsi | Patriarch Elijah Anthony Dohnal | 2008 |

== Patriarch of the Czechoslovak Hussite Church ==
| See | Bishop | Election |
|---|---|---|
| Prague | Patriarch Tomáš Butta | 2006 |

== See also ==
- List of current Christian leaders
- Patriarchs
- List of Primates in the Anglican Communion
