= Lists of popes =

This is a list of lists of popes.

== Lists of popes of the Catholic Church ==
- List of popes of the Catholic Church
  - List of popes (graphical), the same list presented graphically
- List of popes by country
- List of canonised popes
- List of popes by papal name
- List of popes who died violently
- List of fictional popes
- List of popes during the saeculum obscurum, a period of papal electoral corruption, spanning 904–964
- List of sexually active popes

=== By family ===
- List of popes from the Borgia family
- List of popes from the Conti family
- List of popes from the Medici family
- List of popes from the Tuscolo family

== Lists of popes of other churches ==
- List of current popes and patriarchs, current Christian leaders of various denominations whose titles contain pope or patriarch
  - includes section listing those of the Eastern Orthodox Church
- Lists of popes, patriarchs, primates, archbishops, and bishops across various Christian denominations
- List of Coptic Orthodox popes, leaders of the Coptic Orthodox Church
- List of Legio Maria popes, leaders of Legio Maria, a new religious movement of Kenya
- List of Palmarian popes, leaders of the Palmarian Catholic Church, a Spanish breakaway church

== See also ==
- List of current Christian leaders
- List of current popes and patriarchs § Patriarchs in the Eastern Orthodox Church
- List of current popes and patriarchs § Pope and patriarchs in the Catholic Church
