= List of Abunas =

List of Abunas may refer to:

- List of Abunas of Ethiopia
- List of Abunas of Eritrea
