= List of current Christian leaders =

The following is a current list of the highest-ranking leaders in major Christian churches or denominations. The list is in descending order based on the number of congregants.

== Catholic Church ==
=== Pope ===
The 267th bishop of Rome is Pope Leo XIV, who was elected on 8 May 2025. The pope is the patriarch of the Latin Church, the largest of the Catholic Church's 24 autonomous (sui iuris) churches. The pope is also head of the college of bishops which governs the universal church. The Papal primacy doctrine of Catholics states that this primacy extends in perpetuity to the pope and throughout the Catholic Church.

=== Eastern Catholic Churches ===
The pope is the supreme leader of these churches, and also, the head of the universal college of bishops. Each autonomous (sui iuris) church has its own patriarch or other presiding bishop:

- Coptic Catholic Church: Patriarch Ibrahim Isaac Sidrak
- Melkite Greek-Catholic Church: Patriarch Youssef Absi
- Maronite Church: Patriarch Bechara Boutros al-Rahi
- Syriac Catholic Church: Patriarch Mar Ignatius Joseph III Yonan
- Chaldean Catholic Church: Patriarch Paul III Nona
- Armenian Catholic Church: Patriarch Raphaël Bedros XXI Minassian
- Ukrainian Greek-Catholic Church: Major Archbishop Sviatoslav Shevchuk
- Syro-Malabar Church: Major Archbishop Mar Raphael Thattil
- Syro-Malankara Catholic Church: Major Archbishop Moran Mor Baselios Cleemis Catholicos
- Romanian Greek-Catholic Church: Major Archbishop Claudiu-Lucian Pop
- Ruthenian Greek Catholic Church: Metropolitan William C. Skurla
- Hungarian Greek Catholic Church: Bishop Péter Fülöp Kocsis
- Slovak Greek Catholic Church: Metropolitan Jonáš Maxim
- Ethiopian Catholic Church: Archbishop Berhaneyesus Souraphiel
- Eritrean Catholic Church: Archbishop Menghesteab Tesfamariam

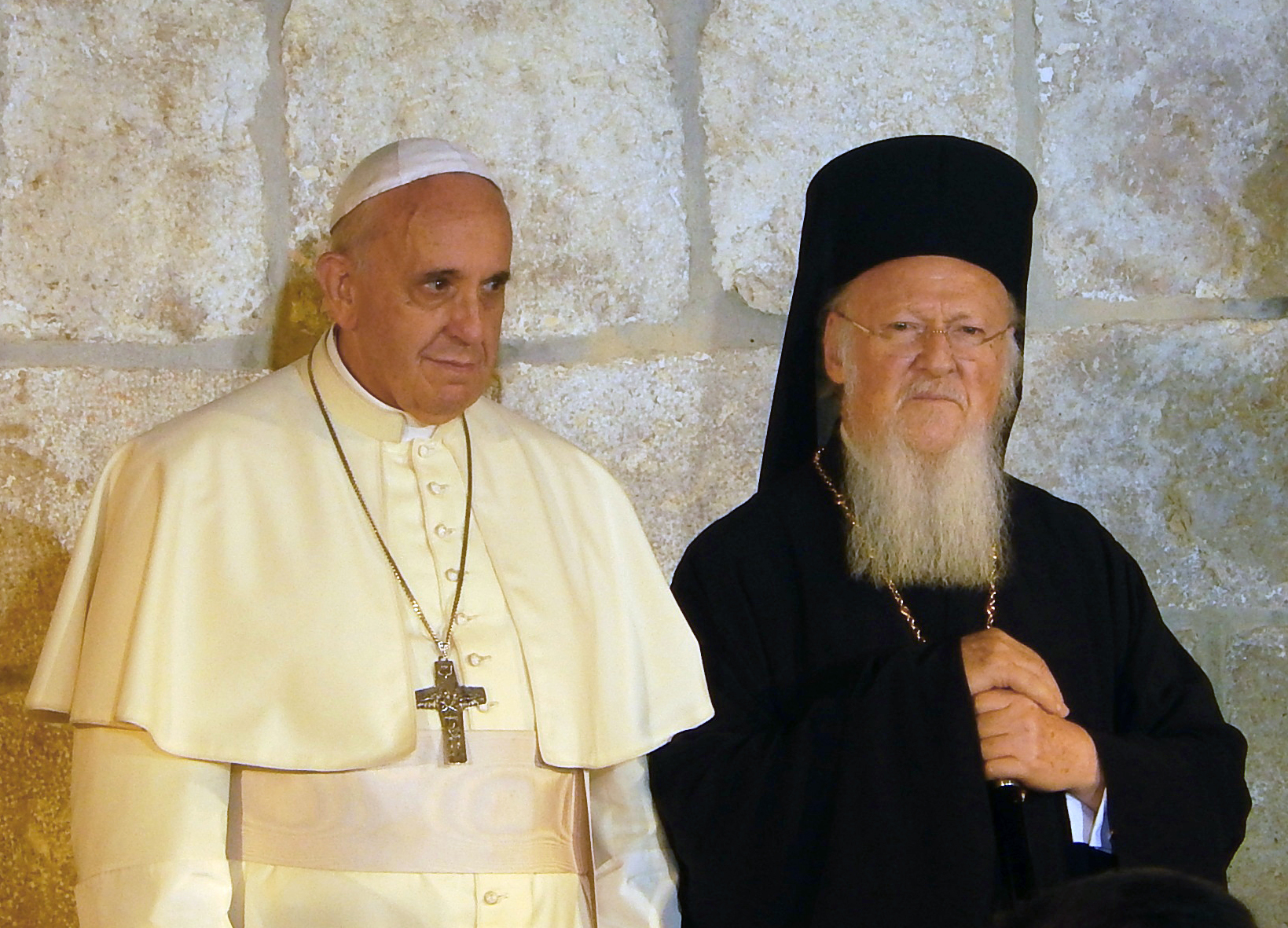
Pope Francis and Patriarch Bartholomew I of Constantinople, Church of the Holy Sepulchre, Jerusalem

== Eastern Orthodox Church ==
=== Patriarchates ===
- Ecumenical Patriarchate of Constantinople: Bartholomew I of Constantinople
- Pope and Patriarch of Alexandria: Theodore II
- Patriarch of Antioch: John X
- Patriarch of Jerusalem: Theophilos III
- Patriarch of Moscow and all Rus': Kirill
- Serbian Patriarch: Porfirije
- Patriarch of Romania: Daniel
- Patriarch of All Bulgaria: Daniil
- Catholicos-Patriarch of All Georgia: Shio III

=== Archbishoprics ===
- Archbishop of Cyprus: George III
- Archbishop of Athens and all Greece: Ieronymos II
- Archbishop of Albania: Joani of Albania
- Archbishop of Ohrid and Macedonia: Stefan

=== Metropolises ===
- Metropolitan of All Poland: Sawa
- Metropolitan of the Czech Lands and Slovakia: Rastislav of Prešov

=== Churches in partial communion ===
- Metropolitan of All America and Canada: Tikhon Mollard (autocephaly not universally recognized)
- Metropolitan of Kyiv and All Ukraine: Epiphanius of Kyiv (autocephaly not universally recognized, canonical ordination not universally recognised)

== Oriental Orthodox Churches ==
- Pope of the Coptic Orthodox Church of Alexandria: Tawadros II. He also holds the title Patriarch of All Africa on the Holy Apostolic See of Saint Mark the Evangelist and is the spiritual leader of more than 16 million Copts.
- Syriac Orthodox Patriarch of Antioch and All the East: Ignatius Aphrem II. He is also the Supreme head of the Universal Syriac Orthodox Church and Malankara Jacobite Syrian Orthodox Church in India.
- Catholicos of India: Baselios Joseph. He also holds the office of Malankara Metropolitan of Malankara Jacobite Syrian Orthodox Church.
- Catholicos of All Armenians: Karekin II
- Catholicos of the East: Baselios Marthoma Mathews III
- Patriarch-Catholicos of Axum: Abune Mathias
- Patriarch of Eritrea: Basilos

=== Churches not in communion ===
- Patriarch of the British Orthodox Church: Abba Seraphim El-Suriani
- Metropolitan of the Malabar Independent Syrian Church: Cyril Mar Baselios I

== Church of the East ==
- Catholicos-Patriarch of the Assyrian Church of the East: Mar Awa III
- Catholicos-Patriarch of the Ancient Church of the East: Gewargis III Younan

== Old Catholic Church ==
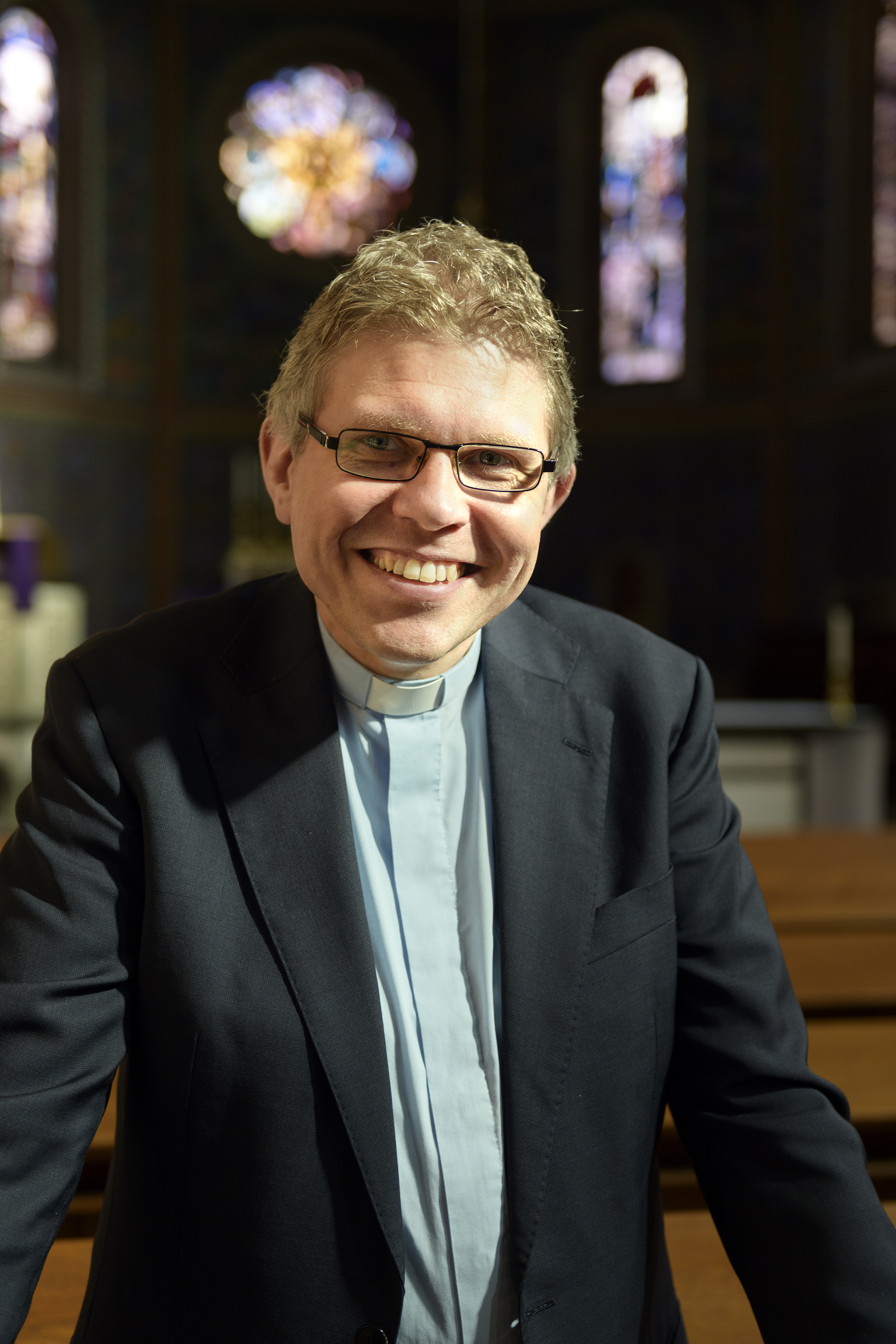
Archbishop of Utrecht Bernd Wallet

- Old Catholic Archbishop of Utrecht: Bernd Wallet, the principal leader of the Union of Utrecht. As a primate of the Old Catholic Church in communion with the see of Utrecht, he is considered first among equals though he does not have jurisdictional authority.
- Prime Bishop of the Polish National Catholic Church: Anthony Mikovsky, the principal leader of the Union of Scranton.

== Anglican Communion ==
- Archbishop of Canterbury, primate of the Church of England and ceremonial head of the Anglican Communion: archbishop Sarah Mullally
- Monarch of the United Kingdom: King Charles III is the supreme governor of the Church of England, which places him as the titular leader of Anglican Christians in England.

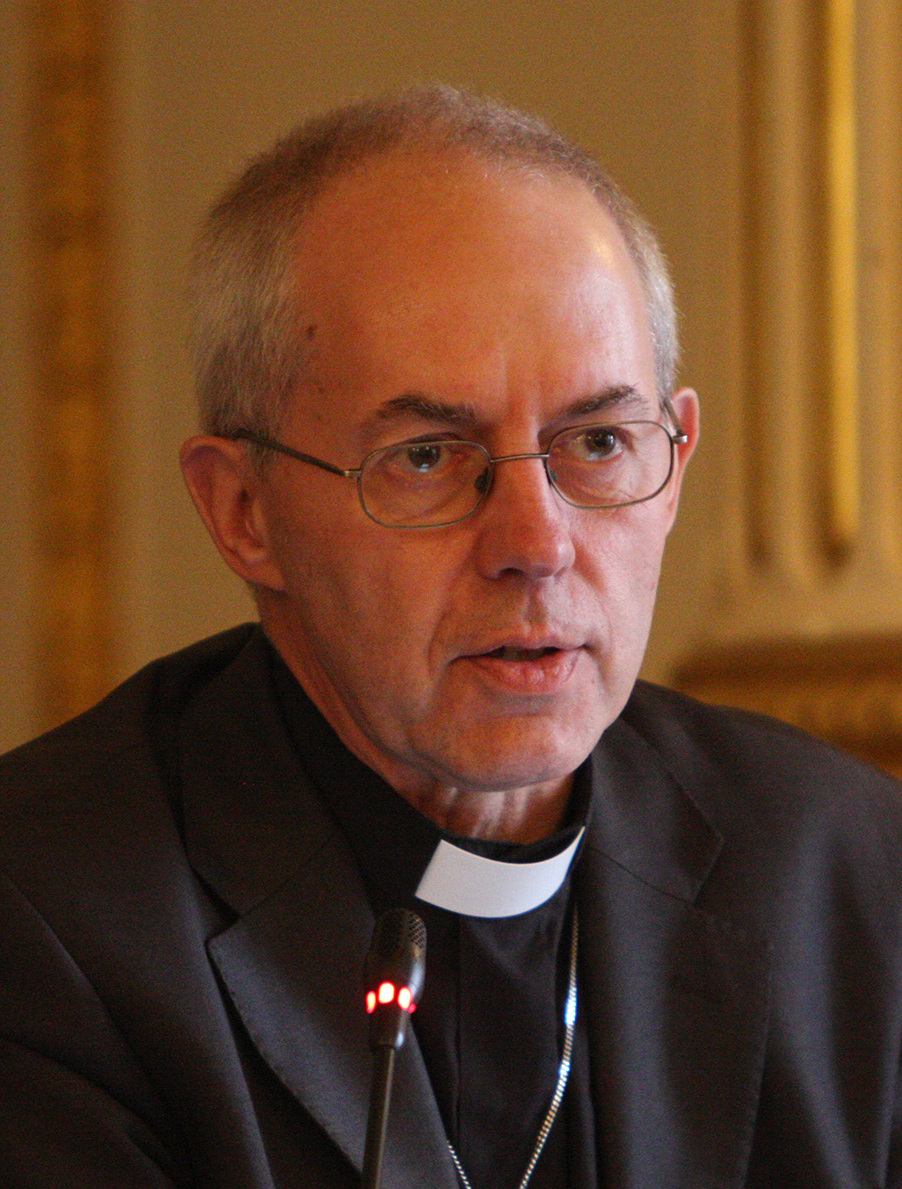
Justin Welby, most recent Archbishop of Canterbury and Primate of All England

- Presiding Bishop of the Episcopal Church: The Most Rev. Sean Rowe
- Archbishop of Wales, Primate of the Church in Wales: The Most Rev. Cherry Vann
- Primus of the Scottish Episcopal Church: The Most Rev. Mark Strange
- Archbishop of Armagh, Primate of the Church of Ireland: John McDowell
- Primate of the Anglican Church of Canada: The Most Rev. Shane Parker
- Primate of the Anglican Episcopal Church of Brazil: The Most Rev. Marinez Santos Bassotto
- Primate of the Anglican Church of Australia: The Most Rev. Mark Short
- President Bishop of the Episcopal Church in Jerusalem and the Middle East: The Most Rev. Hosam Naoum
- Mar Thoma Metropolitan of the Mar Thoma Syrian Church: Theodosius Mar Thoma

== Other ==
- Presiding Bishop of the Global United Fellowship: Bishop Joel Peebles
- Secretary General of the World Evangelical Alliance: Thomas Schirrmacher
- Chairman of the World Assemblies of God Fellowship: David Mohan
- President of the World Communion of Reformed Churches: Najla Kassab
- President of the World Methodist Council: Bishop Debra Wallace-Padget
- President of the Confessional Evangelical Lutheran Conference (CELC): Rev. Gaylin Schmeling
- President of the Lutheran World Federation: Bishop Henrik Stubkjær. Although the president does not have any jurisdiction outside of his own regional church, as president of the LWF he oversees the meetings of the leaders of other regional churches.
- Chairman of the Pentecostal World Fellowship: Dr. William Wilson
- Chief Apostle of the New Apostolic Church: Jean-Luc Schneider
- President of the General Conference of the Seventh-day Adventist Church: Elder Erton Köhler
- President of the Baptist World Alliance: Tomás Mackey
- President of the Church of Jesus Christ of Latter-day Saints: Dallin H. Oaks
- Presiding Bishop of the Church Of God In Christ Inc.: John Drew Sheard, Sr
- Executive Minister of Iglesia ni Cristo: Eduardo V. Manalo
- General of The Salvation Army: Lyndon Buckingham
- Prophet-President of the Community of Christ: Stassi D. Cramm
- Patriarch of the Czechoslovak Hussite Church: Tomáš Butta
- President of the Synod of the Reformed Church in the United States: Dr. Frank Walker
- Patriarch of the Apostolic Catholic Church: Juan Almario Calampiano
- Overall Servant of the Members Church of God International: Daniel Razon
- President of the Southern Baptist Convention: Willy Rice
- General Superintendent of the United Pentecostal Church International: David K. Bernard
- Moderator of the Church of Scotland: Rosemary Frew
- Presiding Bishop of the Evangelical Lutheran Church in America: Yehiel Curry
- Moderator of the Metropolitan Community Church: Cecilia Eggleston
- President of the United Methodist Church: Tracy Smith Malone
- General Minister and President of the Christian Church (Disciples of Christ): Teresa Hord Owens
- Moderator of the United Church of Canada: Kimberly Heath
- General Minister and President of the United Church of Christ: Karen Georgia Thompson
- Co-moderators of the Presbyterian Church (USA):Cecelia Armstrong and Anthony Larson
