= Abune Phillipos =

Patriarch of the Eritrean Orthodox Tewahedo Church from 1999 to 2001

His Holiness Abune Phillipos
- Patriarch of the Eritrean Orthodox Tewahedo Church
- Church: Eritrean Orthodox Tewahedo Church
- Installed: 29 April 1999
- Term ended: 27 September 2001
- Predecessor: Paulos (before autocephaly from Ethiopia)
- Successor: Yacob

Personal details
- Born: 29 September 1901 Endadeko, Italian Eritrea
- Died: 17 September 2002 (aged 100) Asmara, Eritrea
- Denomination: Oriental Orthodoxy (Eritrean Tewahedo)

Abune Phillipos (29 September 1901 – 17 September 2002) was the first patriarch of the Eritrean Orthodox Tewahedo Church.

== Life ==
He was born in Endadeko, Ighelehames, Akeleguzay, Eritrea and began his religious training at the Debre Bizen Monastery at the age of eleven, and took monastic and priestly vows there. He was raised to the rank of Bishop and then Archbishop of the Ethiopian Orthodox Church at Addis Ababa, but then left that church to join the Eritrean Synod when the Eritrean Orthodox Tewahedo Church broke away from the Ethiopian church upon the independence of Eritrea in 1993. He was then elevated to the rank of Patriarch of Eritrea in April 1999, when he reached the ripe old age of 98 years at the hands of Coptic Pope Shenouda III, and was enthroned in Asmara. He joined Ethiopian Patriarch Abuna Paulos in an unsuccessful effort to mediate the war between Ethiopia and Eritrea.

Phillipos died after a long illness on September 17, 2002. He was buried at the Debre Bizen Monastery. He was succeeded by Yacob.

Religious titles
Preceded by Paulos; Prior to Autocephaly as Patriarch of the Ethiopian Orthodox Tewahedo Church	Patriarch of the Eritrean Orthodox Tewahedo Church; 1999–2001	Succeeded by Yacob
