= Abune Qerlos =

Oriental Orthodox archbishop (1927–2022)

His Holiness Abune Qerlos
- Patriarch of the Eritrean Orthodox Tewahedo Church
- Church: Eritrean Orthodox Tewahedo Church
- Diocese: Adi Keyih
- Appointed: 13 June 2021
- Term ended: 2 December 2022
- Predecessor: Abune Dioskoros
- Successor: Abune Basilos

Personal details
- Born: 28 September 1927 Italian Eritrea
- Died: 2 December 2022 (aged 95) Asmara, Eritrea
- Buried: Abune Bitsu Amlak Monastery
- Denomination: Eritrean Orthodox

Abune Qerlos (28 September 1927 – 2 December 2022) was the fifth Patriarch of the Eritrean Orthodox Tewahedo Church.

== Ecclesiastical career ==
Prior to the election of Qerlos, the position of patriarch of the Eritrean Orthodox Tewahedo Church had been left vacant since the death of Abune Dioskoros in 2015. On 13 May 2021, Qerlos was elected Patriarch of Eritrea at the age of 93. His ordination and enthronement as Patriarch took place a month later on 13 June.

== Personal life and death ==
Qerlos died on 2 December 2022, at the age of 95.

Religious titles
Preceded by Abune Dioskoros	Patriarch of the Eritrean Orthodox Tewahedo Church; 2021–2022	Succeeded by Abune Basilos
