= Abune Antonios =

Patriarch of the Eritrean Orthodox Tewahedo Church from 2004 to 2007

His Holiness Abune Antonios
- Patriarch of the Eritrean Orthodox Tewahedo Church
- Church: Eritrean Orthodox Tewahedo Church
- Appointed: 23 April 2004
- Term ended: 27 May 2007
- Predecessor: Yacob
- Successor: Dioskoros
- Previous post: Abbot of Debre Tsege Abuna Endrias monastery

Orders
- Ordination: 1943

Personal details
- Born: 11 July 1929 Hembrti, Hamasien, Eritrea
- Died: 9 February 2022 (aged 92) Asmara, Eritrea
- Denomination: Eritrean Orthodox

Abune Antonios (Tigrinya: ኣቡነ ኣንጦንዮስ; 11 July 1929 – 9 February 2022) was the third patriarch of the Eritrean Orthodox Tewahedo Church. He was deposed by the Synod of Asmara in 2006, and was placed under house arrest thereafter.

== Ecclesiastical career ==
Antonios was born on 11 July 1929 in the town of Hembrti, north of Asmara in the province of Hamasien. He was ordained priest in 1943 and later elected Abbot in 1955. When the Eritrean Orthodox Tewahedo Church sought autocephaly, he was one of five abbots of monasteries that went to Egypt to be ordained as bishops so that the church would have its own Holy Synod. He was ordained as Bishop Antonios of Hamasien-Asmara on 19 June 1994 in Saint Mark's Coptic Orthodox Cathedral, Cairo, by Shenouda III, Pope of the Coptic Orthodox Church of Alexandria. Following the death of Yacob in 2003, he was elected Patriarch in popular elections which were unanimously endorsed by the Holy Synod of the church. His ordination and enthronement as Patriarch took place on 23 April 2004 in Asmara, at the hands of Pope Shenouda III, assisted by Eritrean and Coptic Orthodox Metropolitans and Bishops. He was the first Patriarch of Eritrea to have been enthroned who had not previously been a bishop in the Ethiopian Orthodox Tewahedo Church.

== Removal from church ==
In January 2005, the Patriarch's annual Nativity message was not broadcast or televised. On 27 May 2007, he was replaced as Patriarch by Dioskoros, with the support of the Eritrean government. Antonios remained under house arrest and strict surveillance and held without charge. He reportedly seldom received visitors, including relatives, and had no telephone service. Since 2007, Antonios had been considered by the United States to be a religious prisoner of conscience. His removal at the behest of the Eritrean government was denounced by the other Oriental Orthodox Churches, who refused to recognize Dioskoros as Patriarch of Eritrea.

In July 2019, in an unprecedented move, bishops of the Holy Synod of the Eritrean Orthodox Tewahedo Church excommunicated Antonios for heresy. The letter from five of the six most senior Eritrean bishops declared that "His name should never be mentioned and remembered and those who do so will be punished severely." Although the patriarch was expelled from being a member of the church, the bishops promised he could still live in a church building. The president of the Standing Conference of Oriental Orthodox Churches condemned the excommunication.

He died while in detention in Asmara, Eritrea, on 9 February 2022 at the age of 93.

== See also ==
- Fikremariam Hagos Tsalim

Religious titles
Preceded by Yacob	Patriarch of the Eritrean Orthodox Tewahedo Church; 2004–2006 (officially); 2007–2022	Succeeded by Dioskoros (2007–2015)
