= Abune Dioskoros =

Patriarch of the Eritrean Orthodox Tewahedo Church from 2007 to 2015

His Holiness Abune Dioskoros
- Patriarch of the Eritrean Orthodox Tewahedo Church (Disputed)
- Church: Eritrean Orthodox Tewahedo Church
- Appointed: 19 April 2007
- Term ended: 21 December 2015
- Predecessor: Antonios
- Successor: Qerlos
- Previous posts: Bishop of Seraye district (1994–2004), Bishop of South West (2004–2007)

Orders
- Consecration: 19 May 1994

Personal details
- Born: Diosqoros Hagos Mendefera; 1935
- Died: 21 December 2015 (aged 79–80)
- Denomination: Eritrean Orthodox Tewahedo

Abune Diosqoros (born Diosqoros Hagos Mendefera; 1935 – 21 December 2015) was the fourth patriarch of the Eritrean Orthodox Tewahedo Church, appointed in April 2007.

== Bishop ==
Born in 1935, Dioskoros was consecrated as bishop of the Seraye district in the feast of Pentecost on 19 May 1994 by Coptic Orthodox Pope Shenouda III of Alexandria. In 2004 he was transferred to the Diocese of the South West, where was a ruling bishop until his disputed election as the head of the Eritrean Orthodox Tewahedo Church on 19 April 2007.

== Patriarch ==
Dioskoros' appointment was made possible because the regime in Eritrea changed the rules for the appointment, so that the Holy Synod of the church could assign a layman to be the new Patriarch. The removal of Antonios (1927-2022), the former legal Patriarch, at the behest of the Eritrean government was denounced by Coptic Pope Shenouda III of Alexandria and the Ethiopian Orthodox Tewahedo Church who have refused to recognize Dioskoros as legitimate Patriarch of Eritrea, as did several Eritrean churches, particularly in the diaspora, which continued to endorse his predecessor. The former Patriarch Antonios, who was removed from the post after having criticized the Eritrean government for interference in church affairs, has been held under house arrest by the regime in Eritrea since 2005.

In October 2014 the Union of Eritrean Monasteries issued a decree excommunicating Dioskoros' governmental allies, the priest Habtom Russom Habte and the layman Yoftahe Dimetros Gebre-mariam, citing a long list of alleged abuses during their administration during Dioskoros' reign. However Dioskoros was not directly excommunicated in the process. The Eritrean Government accused several monks of being a major force behind the excommunication letter. A number of the monks allegedly involved decided to escape and take refuge in Ethiopia.

Dioskoros died on 21 December 2015. Since his death, the position of patriarch of the Eritrean Orthodox Tewahedo Church fell vacant until 2021, with the election of Qerlos.

Religious titles
Preceded by Antonios	Disputed; Patriarch of the Eritrean Orthodox Tewahedo Church; 2007–2015	Succeeded by Qerlos
