= Abune Yacob =

Patriarch of the Eritrean Orthodox Tewahedo Church from 2000 to 2002

Yacob
- Eritrean Orthodox Tewahedo Church
- Installed: 4 December 2002
- Term ended: 1 December 2003
- Predecessor: Phillipos
- Successor: Antonios

Personal details
- Born: 5 July 1924 Italian Eritrea
- Died: 1 December 2003 (aged 79) Asmara, Eritrea

Abune Yacob (Tigrinya: ኣቡነ ያዕቆብ; 5 July 1924 – 1 December 2003) was the second patriarch of the Eritrean Orthodox Tewahdo Church.

Yacob was born and ordained in Eritrea. He was an archbishop of the Ethiopian Orthodox Church, and served briefly as locum tenens (acting patriarch) of the Ethiopian Orthodox Tewahdo Church following the abdication of Patriarch Merkorios in 1991. However, following the split of the Eritrean Orthodox Church from the Ethiopian Church, he moved to the Eritrean synod as a native Eritrean.

The autocephaly of the Eritrean Orthodox Tewahdo Church was recognised in 1994. Phillipos was the first patriarch of the church, and after his death, Yacob became patriarch in December 2002.

Yacob was first ordained in 1938 and was ordained a monk in 1942 under the nickname ‘Abba Teklemariam’”. In 1955, he was elected abbot of Debre Tzege Abune Andreas Monastery. On May 07, 1980, he was ordained a bishop of the Ethiopian Orthodox Tewahedo Church by Abune Teklehaimanot III. He served as the chief administrator of the diocese, assistant patriarch and vice-president of the Holy Synod.

He was ordained the second patriarch of the Orthodox Tewahedo Church of Eritrea on December 4, 2002.

Yacob died on 1 December 2003. He was succeeded by Antonios.

Religious titles
Preceded by Phillipos	Patriarch of the Eritrean Orthodox Tewahedo Church; 2001–2003	Succeeded by Antonios
