= Eritrean Orthodox Tewahedo Church =

Oriental Orthodox Church denomination

- ቤተ ክርስትያን ኦርቶዶክስ ተዋሕዶ ኤርትራ; Bet'ə K'rstian Ortdodox Tewahədo Ertra
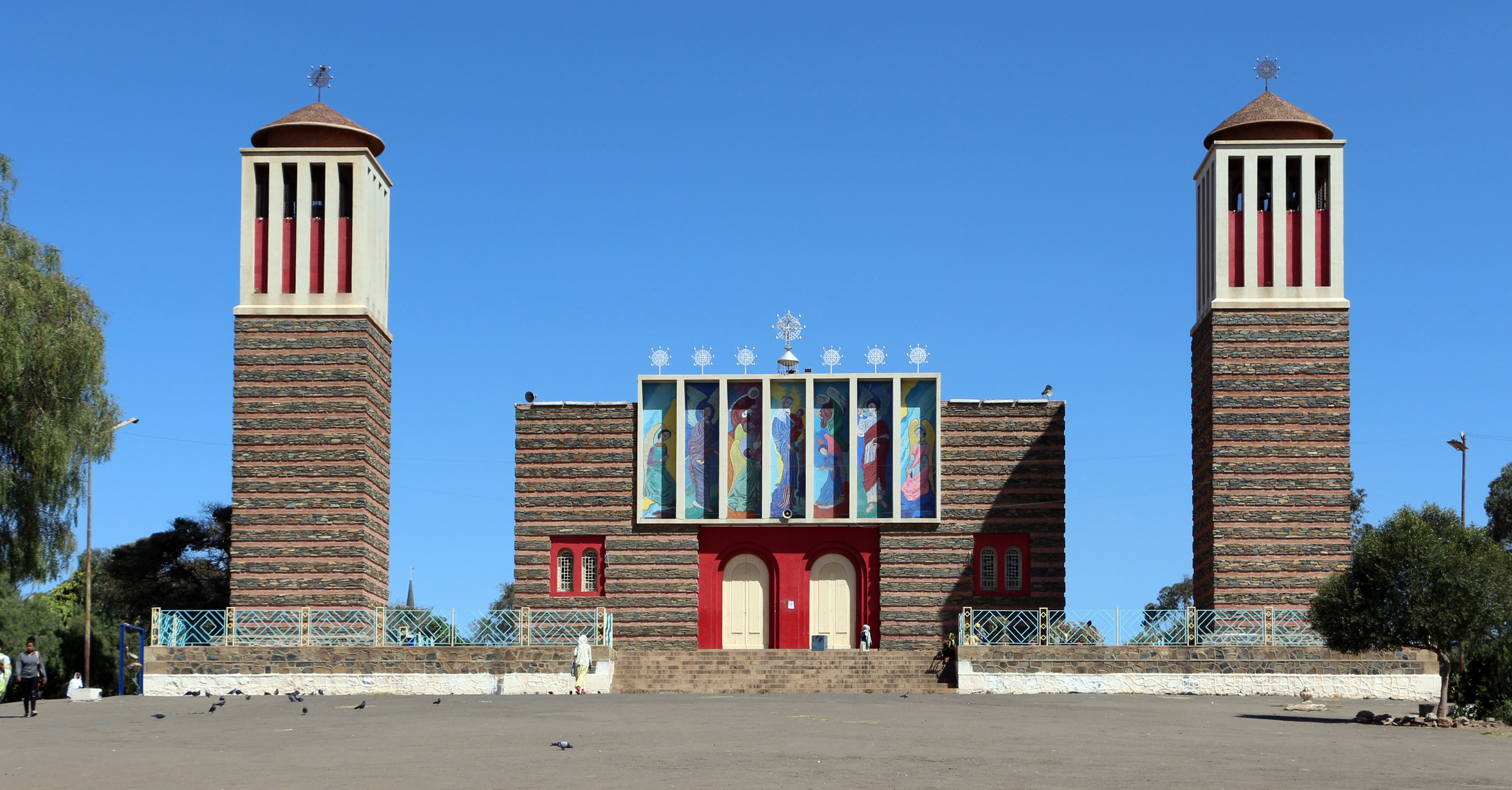
- Enda Mariam Cathedral in Asmara, the seat of the Eritrean Orthodox Tewahedo Church
- Abbreviation: EOTC
- Classification: Oriental Orthodox
- Orientation: Orthodox Tewahedo
- Scripture: Orthodox Tewahedo Bible
- Theology: Oriental Orthodox theology
- Polity: Episcopal
- Primate: Basilos
- Region: Eritrea and Eritrean diaspora
- Language: Geʽez, Tigrinya
- Headquarters: Enda Mariam Cathedral, Asmara, Eritrea
- Founder: The Apostle and Evangelist Mark in 42 AD Alexandria, Saint Frumentius in 328 AD Axum (according to the Eritrean Orthodox tradition), Abune Phillipos in 1993 AD Asmara (modern)
- Independence: From the Ethiopian Orthodox Tewahedo Church in 1991
- Members: 3 million
- www.lisantewahdo.org

The Eritrean Orthodox Tewahedo Church (Tigrinya: ናይ ኦርቶዶክስ ተዋሕዶ ኤርትራ, romanized: beta krstyan tawahdo ertra) is one of the Oriental Orthodox Churches with its headquarters in Asmara, Eritrea. It was given autocephaly by Shenouda III of Alexandria, pope of the Coptic Orthodox Church, after Eritrea gained its independence from Ethiopia in 1993. Thus, the Eritrean Church accords a primacy of honor to the Coptic Church.

Sources differ on the percentage of Christians in the Eritrean population, with most figures being close to one-half, although some sources report slightly more than 60%. Almost 90% of Eritrean Christians are followers of Oriental Orthodoxy. The rest of the population is almost entirely Muslim.

== History ==
=== Origins ===
Tewahedo (Ge'ez: ተዋሕዶ täwaḥədo) is a Geʽez word meaning "being made one".

According to the Catholic Encyclopedia (1917 edition) article on the Henoticon: around 500 AD bishops within the Patriarchates of Alexandria, Antioch and Jerusalem refused to accept the "two natures" doctrine decreed by the Council of Chalcedon in 451, thus separating themselves from the rest of Christianity since that time. This separate Christian communion came to be known as Oriental Orthodoxy. The Oriental Orthodox Churches, which today include the Coptic Orthodox Church of Alexandria, the Armenian Apostolic Church, the Syriac Orthodox Church, the Malankara Orthodox Syrian Church of India, the Ethiopian Orthodox Tewahedo Church, and the Eritrean Orthodox Tewahedo Church, are referred to as "Non-Chalcedonian". These churches themselves describe their Christology as miaphysite, but outsiders often describe them as monophysite.

=== Jesuit interim ===
Ignatius of Loyola (1491–1556) wished to attempt the task of conversion, but this did not happen. Instead, Pope Paul III sent out João Nunes Barreto as Patriarch of the East Indies, with Andrés de Oviedo as bishop; and from Goa envoys (followed by Oviedo) went to Ethiopia.

=== Autocephaly after independence of Eritrea ===
The first independent Patriarch of Eritrea was Abune Phillipos, who died in 2002 and was succeeded by Abune Yacob. The reign of Abune Yacob as Patriarch of Eritrea was very brief, as he died not long after his enthronement, and he was succeeded by Abune Antonios as 3rd Patriarch of Eritrea. Abune Antonios was elected on 5 March 2004, and enthroned as the third Patriarch of Orthodox Tewahedo Church of Eritrea on 24 April 2004. Pope Shenouda III presided at the ceremony in Asmara, together with the Holy Synod of the Eritrean Orthodox Church and a Coptic Orthodox Church delegation.

In August 2005, Abune Antonios, the Patriarch of the Eritrean Orthodox Tewahedo Church, was confined to a strictly ceremonial role. In a letter dated 13 January 2006, Patriarch Abune Antonios was informed that following several sessions of the church's Holy Synod, he had been formally deposed. In a written response that was widely published, the Patriarch rejected the grounds of his dismissal, questioned the legitimacy of the synod, and excommunicated two signatories to the 13 January 2006 letter, including Yoftahe Dimetros, whom the Patriarch identified as being responsible for the church's recent upheavals. Patriarch Antonios also appealed his case to the Council of the Monasteries of the Eritrean Orthodox Church and to the Coptic Orthodox Church of Alexandria. Abune Antonios was deposed by the Eritrean Holy Synod supposedly under pressure from the Eritrean government; as of 2006 he is under house arrest.

Abuna Antonios was replaced by Abune Dioskoros as the fourth Patriarch of the church. Patriarch Abuna Dioskoros died on 21 December 2015. Qerlos became the fifth patriarch of the church in June 2021.

== Traditions ==
In common with all Eastern Orthodox, Oriental Orthodox, and Western Orthodox churches; the Catholic Church and the Old Catholic churches of the Union of Utrecht, the Eritrean Orthodox Tewahedo Church professes belief in the seven sacraments of baptism, confirmation/chrismation, eucharist, confession, the anointing of the sick, matrimony, and holy orders. It regards the first four as being "necessary for every believer".

The church holds the ancient Christian belief in the Real Presence of Christ in the Eucharist stating that "The consecrated bread and wine are the body and blood of Christ. Jesus Christ is truly, really and substantially present in the consecrated elements. In the Eucharist, we eat the blessed flesh of our Lord and drink His precious blood under the form of bread and wine."

As in other Eastern Christian traditions, the bond of marriage is able to be dissolved, but only on the grounds of adultery. To safeguard the practice of the faith, church members are discouraged from marrying people outside of the Orthodox communion. Church members who undergo a purely civil ceremony are not regarded as sacramentally married.

=== Liturgical language ===
The traditional liturgical language of the Eritrean Orthodox Tewahedo Church is Geʽez, the language of the early Aksumite Christians of the region. Though Geʽez has no more native speakers, the language is still used for church liturgical functions and festivities. However, the sibket (sermon) is normally in given in the local Tigrinya language. Geʽez is currently being replaced by Tigrinya as the principal language for church services.

=== Biblical canon ===
The Tewahedo Church Biblical Canon contains 81 books, including almost all of those which are accepted by other Orthodox and Oriental Christians; the exception is the Books of the Maccabees, at least some of which are accepted in the Eastern Orthodox and other Oriental Orthodox churches, but not in the Tewahedo churches (the books of Meqabyan, which are accepted instead, have an etymologically connected name, but rather different content). The Eritrean Orthodox canon and the Ethiopian Orthodox canon are identical.

- The Narrower Canon also contains Enoch, Jubilees, and three books of the Meqabyan;
- The Broader Canon includes all of the books found in the Narrower Canon, as well as the two Books of the Covenant, Four Books of Sinodos, a Book of Clement, and Didascalia;

=== Similarities to Judaism and Islam ===
Like the Ethiopian Church, the Eritrean Church places a heavier emphasis on Old Testament teachings than one might find in other churches. Women are prohibited from entering the church temple during menses; they are also expected to cover their hair with a large scarf (or shash) while in church, as described in 1 Corinthians, chapter 11. As with Orthodox synagogues, men and women sit separately in the Ethiopian church, with men on the left and women on the right (when facing the altar). (Women covering their heads and separation of the sexes in churches officially is common to few other Christian traditions; it is also the rule in some non-Christian religions, Islam and Orthodox Judaism among them).

Before praying, the Eritrean Orthodox wash their hands and face, in order to be clean before and present their best to God; shoes are removed in order to acknowledge that one is offering prayer before a holy God. Eritrean Orthodox worshippers remove their shoes when entering a church temple, in accordance with Exodus 3:5 (in which Moses, while viewing the burning bush, was commanded to remove his shoes while standing on holy ground). Furthermore, the Eritrean Orthodox Tewahedo Church like its Ethiopian counterpart is known to observe the seventh-day Sabbath (Saturday, or the lesser Sabbath), in addition to the Lord's Day (Sunday, or the Christian Sabbath), recognizing both to be holy days of joy, prayer, and contemplation, although more emphasis, because of the Resurrection of Christ, is laid upon Sunday. While the Tewahedo Churches are known for this practice, it is neither an innovation nor unique to them, deriving from the Apostolic Constitutions and the Apostolic Canons and only became a theological dispute in the Coptic Orthodox Church of Alexandria in the centuries leading up to the issue being rectified by Ewostatewos. The emperor Gelawdewos in his Confession, an apologia of traditional beliefs and practices explicitly says "we do not honour it as the Jews do... but we so honour it that we celebrate thereon the Eucharist and have love-feasts, even as our Fathers the Apostles have taught us in the Didascalia".

It is a common cultural practice for members of the Eritrean Orthodox Tewahedo Church to undergo male circumcision and to abstain from meats deemed unclean. This is purely done as a cultural tradition and not out of religious obligation, the liturgy explicitly stating "let us not be circumcised like the Jews. We know that He who had to fulfil the law and the prophets has already come.".

== Patriarchs and bishops of Eritrea ==
After declaration of autocephaly of the Eritrean Orthodox Tewahedo Church was recognized by the Coptic Orthodox Church of Alexandria in 1994, the newly established patriarchal seat of Eritrea remained vacant until 1999 when Philipos was elected Abune Phillipos and the first patriarch of Eritrea (1999–2001). He was succeeded by Abune Yacob in 2002 and Abune Antonios in 2004. Abune Antonios's objections to excommunicating heterodox monks and students in Asmara led to his exile via house arrest and excommunication.

In April 2007, the Synod elected a new patriarch, Abune Dioskoros, who was the Patriarch of Eritrea until his death on 21 December 2015.

On December 9, 2024, Archbishop Abune Basilyos was elected as the 6th Patriarch of the Eritrean Orthodox Tewahdo Church. His enthronement is scheduled for January 26, 2025, at the Church of Saint Virgin Mary.

=== List of abunas ===
Vacant from 1994 to 1999, and from December 2015 to June 2021.

1. Phillipos (1999–2001)
2. Yacob (2002–2003)
3. Antonios (2004–2006) – Uncanonical deposed by the Holy Synod of the Eritrean Orthodox Tewahedo Church with the pressure of GoE.
4. Dioskoros (2007–2015) – Replaced Abune Antonios Uncanonicaly. It was condemned by the Oriental Orthodox communion.
5. Qerlos (13 May 2021 – 2 December 2022)
6. Basilos (10 December 2024 - Present)

== See also ==
- Religion in Eritrea
- Christianity in Eritrea
- Biblical law in Christianity
- Christian observances of Jewish holidays
- Christianity and Judaism
- Eastern Christianity
- Eastern Orthodox Christianity
- Ethiopian Orthodox Tewahedo Church
- List of calendar of saints in the Orthodox Tewahedo
- Oriental Orthodox Christianity

== Sources ==
- Binns, John (2016). The Orthodox Church of Ethiopia: A History. Tauris. ISBN 978-1784536954.
- Brock, Sebastian P. (2016). "Miaphysite, not Monophysite!". Cristianesimo Nella Storia. 37 (1): 45–52. ISBN 9788815261687.
- Meyendorff, John (1989). Imperial unity and Christian divisions: The Church 450-680 A.D. Crestwood, NY: St. Vladimir's Seminary Press. ISBN 9780881410563.
- Winkler, Dietmar W. (1997). "Miaphysitism: A New Term for Use in the History of Dogma and in Ecumenical Theology". The Harp. 10 (3): 33–40.
