= Abune Basilos =

Patriarch of the Eritrean Orthodox Tewahedo Church

His Holiness Abune Basilos
- Patriarch of the Eritrean Orthodox Tewahedo Church
- Church: Eritrean Orthodox Tewahedo Church
- Appointed: 26 January 2025
- Predecessor: Abune Qerlos

Orders
- Consecration: 2005

Personal details
- Born: Elias Dafla; 28 December 1954 (age 71) Ethiopia (present-day Eritrea)
- Denomination: Eritrean Orthodox
- Residence: Asmara
- Occupation: Patriarch

Abune Basilos (born 1954) is the sixth and current patriarch of the Eritrean Orthodox Tewahedo Church.

== Ecclesiastical career ==
Basilos was born in 1954 in the territory of present-day Eritrea. He was tonsured as monk at the young age and was ordained a hierodeacon and soon after a hieromonk. In 2005 he was consecrated a bishop and in 2021 elevated to the rank of archbishop. Before his patriarchal's election, he served as administrator of the Eritrean Church.

Prior to the election of Basilos, the position of patriarch of the Eritrean Orthodox Tewahedo Church had been left vacant since the death of Abune Qerlos in 2022. On 10 December 2024, Basilos was elected Patriarch of Eritrea. His ordination and enthronement as patriarch took place on 26 January 2025.

Religious titles
Preceded by Abune Qerlos	Patriarch of the Eritrean Orthodox Tewahedo Church; 2024–present	Succeeded by Incumbent
