= List of abunas of Eritrea =

Abuna of Eritrea
- Bishopric

Oriental Orthodox
- Incumbent; Basilos; Since 10 December 2024
- Style: His Holiness

Information
- First holder: Phillipos
- Established: 7 May 1999
- Cathedral: Enda Mariam Cathedral, Asmara

Website
- lisantewahdo.org

The Eritrean Orthodox Tewahedo Church is part of the Oriental Orthodox communion, and it was granted autocephaly by Shenouda III, Pope of the Coptic Orthodox Church, in 1994 — a year after Eritrea gained its independence from Ethiopia. Shenouda III ordained five Eritrean high-ranking clergy as Bishops of the Eritrean Orthodox Tewahedo Church on 19 June 1994 in Saint Mark's Coptic Orthodox Cathedral in Cairo, Egypt. This would allow the formation of a local Holy Synod for Eritrea. Shenouda III also agreed that a newly elected Patriarch would be able to consecrate on his own new bishops and metropolitans for the Eritrean Church. The Patriarch of Eritrea also carries the title of Abuna in line with the Ethiopian Orthodox Tewahedo Church.

After declaration of autocephaly of the church in 1994, the position of Patriarch of Eritrea remained vacant until 1999 when Phillipos became the first Patriarch of the Eritrean Orthodox Tewahedo Church.

== Patriarchs of Eritrea ==
No.	Portrait	Abuna (Birth–Death)	Reign	Notes
1		Phillipos (1901–2002)	1999–2001	Born in Endadeko as Tewolde Berhan
2		Yacob (1924–2003)	2002–2003	
3		Antonios (1929–2022)	2004–2006	Deposed by the Eritrean government; under house arrest since January 2006. Born in Hembrti as Gebremedin Debretsion
4		Dioskoros (1934–2015)	2007–2015	Reign disputed by followers of Abune Antonios. Born as Diosqoros Hagos Mendefera
5		Qerlos (1927–2022)	2020–2022	Reign disputed by followers of Abune Antonios until 2022.
6		Basilos (born 1954)	2024–present	Officially consecrated on 26 January 2025.

=== Timeline ===
This is a graphical timeline of the patriarchs of Eritrea. They are listed in order of first assuming office.

The following chart lists the patriarchs by lifespan, with the years outside of their tenure in blue.

== See also ==
- Coptic Christianity
- List of abunas of Ethiopia
- Tigrayan Orthodox Tewahedo Church
