= Tehadiso =

Reformed Christian movement within the Ethiopian Orthodox Tewahedo Church

Tehadiso (Ge'ez: ተሃድሶ, meaning "renaissance" or "reformation") is a group of reformed Christian movement within the Ethiopian Orthodox Tewahedo Church based on Evangelical Protestant theology. It includes priests, deacons and monks operating in both the former Exiled-Synod and the Holy-Synod.

The earliest Tehadiso church was Medhanialem Tehadiso Church founded in 1946. The movement is one of the most controversial within the Ethiopian Orthodox Tewahedo Church; the Mahibere Kidusan organization believes Tehadiso to be "heretical," and that it spreads globalization, secularization, and ecumenism in the church.

== See also ==
- Mahibere Kidusan
- P'ent'ay
- Pentecostalism in Ethiopia
