= Matthias I =

Matthias I may refer to:

- Matthias I, Duke of Lorraine (1119–1176)
- Matthias Corvinus of Hungary (1443–1490)
- Matthias, Holy Roman Emperor (1557–1619)
- Abune Mathias (born 1941), Patriarch of the Ethiopian Orthodox Tewahedo Church since 2013
