= Abune Paulos =

Patriarch of the Ethiopian Orthodox Tewahedo Church from 1992 to 2012

His Holiness Abune Paulos
- Patriarch and Catholicos of Ethiopia, Archbishop of Axum and Echege of the See of Takla Haymanot
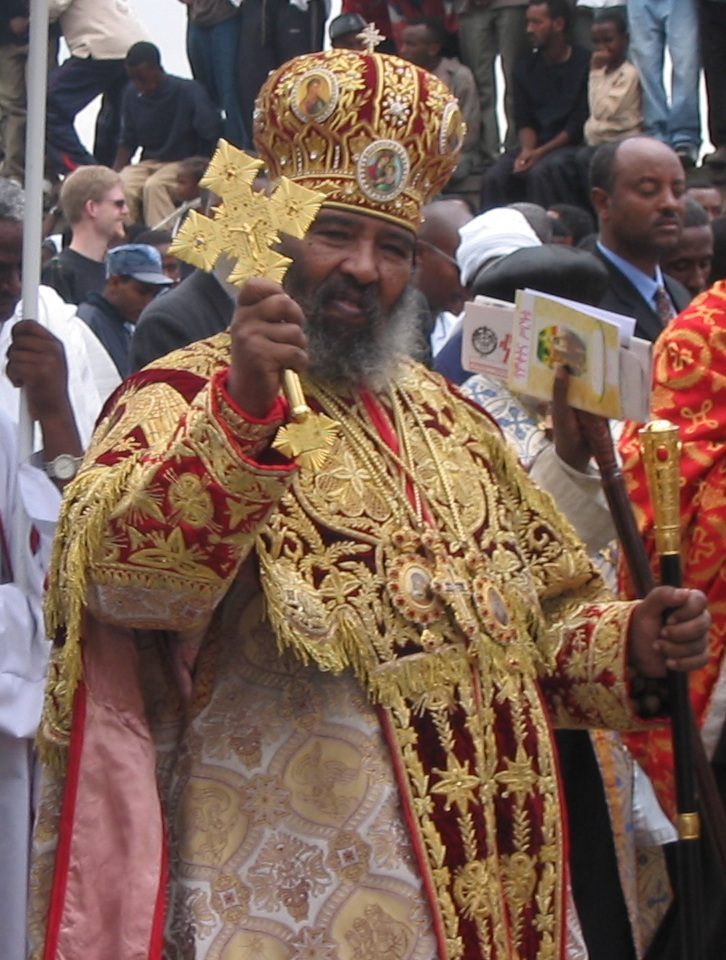
- Abune Paulos at Timket celebration in 2005
- Church: Ethiopian Orthodox Tewahedo Church
- Archdiocese: Aksum and All Ethiopia
- Installed: 1992
- Term ended: 2012
- Predecessor: Abuna Merkorios
- Successor: Abune Mathias (Ethiopia); Abune Phillipos (Eritrean)

Personal details
- Born: Gebremedhin Woldeyohannes; 3 November 1936 Adwa, Eritrea Governorate, Italian East Africa (now Tigray Region, Ethiopia)
- Died: 16 August 2012 (aged 75) Addis Ababa, Ethiopia
- Denomination: Oriental Orthodoxy (Ethiopian Tewahedo)
- Education: Theological College of the Holy Trinity; Saint Vladimir's Orthodox Theological Seminary; Princeton Theological Seminary

Abune Paulos (born Gebremedhin Woldeyohannes; 3 November 1936 – 16 August 2012) was the fifth Patriarch of the Ethiopian Orthodox Tewahedo Church from 1992 to his death in 2012. His full title was "His Holiness Abuna Paulos, Fifth Patriarch of the Orthodox Tewahido Church of Ethiopia, Ichege of the see of Saint Tekle Haymanot, Archbishop of Axum and one of the seven serving Presidents of the World Council of Churches."

== Early life ==
Abune Paulos was born in Adwa in Tigray Province; his birth name was Gebre Medhin Wolde Yohannes. His family was long associated with the Abba Garima Monastery near the town, and he entered the monastery as a young boy as a deacon trainee, eventually taking monastic orders and being ordained a priest. Then known as Abba Gebre Medhin, he continued his education at the Theological College of the Holy Trinity in Addis Ababa under the patronage of Patriarch Abune Tewophilos. He was sent to study at the St. Vladimir's Orthodox Theological Seminary in the United States, and afterwards joined the doctoral program at the Princeton Theological Seminary.

In 1974, his education was interrupted by a summons from Patriarch Abune Tewophilos, and returned to Addis Ababa shortly after the revolution that toppled Emperor Haile Selassie. He was anointed a bishop along with four others, assuming the name and style of Abune Paulos, and given responsibility for ecumenical affairs by the Patriarch. But because the Patriarch had named these new bishops without the permission of the new Derg communist junta, all five men were arrested, and the Patriarch was eventually executed. Abune Paulos and his fellow bishops were imprisoned until 1983. Abune Paulos returned to Princeton in 1984 to complete his doctoral degree there, and began his life as an exile. He was elevated to the rank of Archbishop by Patriarch Abune Takla Haymanot in 1986 while in exile.

== Patriarch ==
Following the fall of the Derg in 1991, the then Patriarch of the Ethiopian Orthodox Tewahedo Church, Abuna Merkorios, was dethroned in circumstances that remain under dispute. Patriarch Abune Merkorios and his supporters maintain that he was forced from office by the new EPRDF-led government of the Federal Democratic Republic of Ethiopia and its supporters, while his opponents maintain that the Patriarch abdicated following numerous protests against him by the faithful. His attempt to reverse his abdication was refused by the Holy Synod of the Church which authorized a new Patriarchal election. Abune Paulos was elected in 1992, and Abune Merkorios and his supporters went into exile, establishing a rival synod in the United States. The enthronement of Abune Paulos as Patriarch was fully recognized by all the canonical Orthodox Christian Churches, including the Coptic Orthodox Church of Alexandria Patriarchate in Alexandria, Egypt.

During his office, much urban property that had been taken from the church was returned, most notably the return of the campus and the library of Holy Trinity Theological College, and the College was reopened. Abuna Paulos built a new Patriarchal office and residence complex at the site of the old one, and reformed the bureaucracy of the Patriarchate. He travelled widely, strengthening the ties of the Ethiopian Orthodox Tewahedo Church with other sister churches. He reluctantly acquiesced to the breaking away of the Eritrean Orthodox Tewahedo Church when that country declared independence. Abune Paulos also took the initiative to the series of peace meetings between all Ethiopian and Eritrean religious leaders in 1998, 1999 and 2000 in an effort to bring peace between the two countries in response to a bitterly fought border war. Patriarch Abune Paulos and the Ethiopian Orthodox Tewahedo Church were extensively involved in the support of war-displaced and drought-hit Ethiopians, making the Ethiopian Orthodox Tewahedo Church one of the major relief organizations in the country.

In 1995, Abuna Paulos asked for the faithful to fulfill their religious obligations by contributing their share to the restoration of Holy Trinity Cathedral. He led a Fundraising Committee of 15 people which was established to work within the country and abroad on the project.

The Patriarch continually championed the cause of the many victims of the Derg regime. Patriarch Abune Paulos presided over the funerals of Emperor Haile Selassie in 2000 (even in the face of government hostility to this event), Crown Prince Asfaw Wossen in 1997, and Princess Tenagnework in 2004. He also presided over the funerals of the 60 ex-officials of the Imperial government in 1993, and the funeral of the leading opposition leader of the time, Professor Asrat Woldeyes in 1998.

Abuna Paulos also found success after he asked a British Museum to return ten "tabots" containing images of the Ark of the Covenant. These carvings, supposedly so sacred that only ordained priests may look at them, were taken by British troops in 1868 during the rescue of the hostages imprisoned by the Emperor Tewdros. In March 2006, Abune Paulos was elected to serve as one of the seven presidents of the World Council of Churches, during its summit in Brazil. On 13 July 2007, Abune Paulos visited the Coptic Orthodox Church of Alexandria in Egypt, met with Pope Shenouda III of Egypt. This visit re-established the relationship between the Ethiopian and Coptic Church after time of separation. Abune Paulos visited some of the Coptic associations in Egypt, and on 15 July, he visited a Coptic Egyptian Church named after an Ethiopian Saint Tekle Haymanot Coptic Orthodox Church in Alexandria, Egypt.

Abune Paulos implemented a proposal to build a University in Entoto that would help to commemorate the millennium according to the Ethiopian calendar. This University is intended to be a study and research center in Entoto Debre Hayl Saint Raguel Church. The Holy Synod and Abune Paulos appealed for the faithful to protect church heritages with a view to enabling them to be transferred to the next generation.

An act of Abune Paulos that caused much controversy was his advocacy of a pardon for the members of the Derg regime imprisoned in Ethiopia. The members of the Derg had asked the Patriarch to facilitate an opportunity for them to appear in the national press to ask for forgiveness from the people of Ethiopia for the errors and atrocities of their regime. The Patriarch approached the government with the idea that as the now aging members of the former communist junta were contrite and seeking forgiveness, the government should grant them clemency. On 1 June 2011, President Girma Wolde Giorgis of Ethiopia announced that the death sentences imposed on the top Derg members had been commuted to life sentences. As under Ethiopian law, a life sentence is equated to 25 years, both those previously sentenced to death and those imprisoned for life and lesser sentences were all immediately freed. This act immediately caused significant uproar among many of the survivors of Derg imprisonment, the family members of those killed during Derg rule and other opponents of Derg rule. The organization of survivors of victims of the Red Terror voiced their opposition and sent a letter of protest to the Patriarch. Members of the families of the 60 ex-officials of Emperor Haile Selassie's government executed without trial on 23 November 1974, as well as some members of the Imperial family met with Abune Paulos as well to make their views known. They believed that a commutation of death sentences to life imprisonment was not as objectionable, but that the release of people responsible for mass killings, torture, imprisonment without trial, and gross abuse of power was a great injustice. The Patriarch counseled these groups that it was the duty of Christians to forgive, especially those who voiced contrition. The groups opposed to the Derg pardon came away from the incident blaming Abune Paulos, but certain prominent members of the group, such as Mulugeta Aserate (son of Prince Aserate Kassa who was executed with the 60 ex-officials on 23 November 1974) wrote articles supporting the Patriarch's promotion of forgiveness and national reconciliation, and applauded the pardon.

His ecumenical trip to India to meet Baselios Thoma Didymos I, Catholicos of the East and Malankara Metropolitan in December 2008, strengthened the communion of Ethiopian and Malankara Orthodox Churches. On 26 June 2009, the Italian press claimed that Abune Paulos along with a man claiming to be a son of the late Prince Makonnen, Duke of Harar and Duke Amedeo of Aosta, would come forward at the Hotel Aldrovandi in Rome with the announcement that the true Ark of the Covenant, which has supposedly been kept in secret at St. Mary's of Zion in Ethiopia, would be unveiled to the public to view for the first time in history in a museum being built in Axum. The announcement was never made; instead the Patriarch immediately denied that any such event had ever been planned. The person that the Italian press had identified as the Ethiopian Prince was subsequently revealed as not being a recognized member of the former Imperial family, but rather a person claiming to be the illegitimate son of the late prince. The involvement of the Duke of Aosta in the affair was also called into question. The cornerstone for a museum at Axum was indeed laid by Patriarch Abune Paulos, but there are no plans to display or house the Ark of the Covenant there.

His attitude towards homosexual Ethiopians remains orthodox. In December 2008, he was one of nearly a dozen Ethiopian religious figures (including the leader of Ethiopian Muslim Majlis Council and the heads of the Protestant and Catholic churches) who adopted a resolution against homosexuality, urging Ethiopian lawmakers to endorse a ban on homosexual activity in the constitution. The religious figures attributed a rise in sexual attacks on children and young men to the vice of homosexuality. Abuna Paulos went on to say, "This is something very strange in Ethiopia, the land of the Bible that condemns this very strongly. For people to act in this manner they have to be dumb, stupid like animals. We strongly condemn this behaviour. They (homosexuals) have to be disciplined and their acts discriminated, they have to be given a lesson."

== Death ==
Abune Paulos died in Addis Ababa on 16 August 2012. The foreign ministry reported that he had been "receiving treatment over the past week for an undisclosed illness." An opposition website, Ethiopian Review, reported that he had died of a heart attack. Lij Mulugeta Aserate Kassa, an adviser at the Ethiopian embassy in the United Kingdom, and a member of a cadet branch of Ethiopia's deposed Imperial family, noted that Abune Paulos had been in good health the previous day and had led a church service. He later felt ill and was taken to Balcha Hospital, according to an independent Orthodox website, Deje Selam, where he died early in the following morning. Although Lij Mulugeta said that he could not confirm the cause of death, Patriarch Abune Paulos was known to have suffered from hypertension and diabetes. Ethiopians were stunned to learn that Prime Minister Meles Zenawi had also died only four days after the Patriarch.

Paulos was buried at Addis Ababa's Holy Trinity Cathedral on 23 August 2012. Several thousand people, as well as representatives from other churches, diplomats, and government officials, attended the state funeral.

== Achievements and awards ==
Abune Paulos was a scholar and peace advocate and a former exile in the United States who has worked on reconciliation between Ethiopia and Eritrea. Patriarch Abune Paulos and the Ethiopian Orthodox Church were also involved in the support of war-displaced and drought-hit Ethiopians, making the Church one of the major "relief organisations" in the country. His peace efforts and humanitarian work were the main reasons for his being chosen to receive the Nansen Medal by the UN High Commissioner for Refugees (UNCHR).

On 30 December 2008, Abune Paulos was awarded the Order of St. Thomas (the highest honorary award given by Indian Orthodox Church) by Catholicos of the East Baselios Marthoma Didymos I at Parumala Seminary, India.

Patriarch Abune Paulos also met with President Omar Hassan Al-Bashir of Sudan in Khartoum to try to find a peaceful solution to the Darfur conflict that has been labeled as a genocide by Western critics. Abune Paulos said “No one loves Africa more than Africans.” The Patriarch stated that finding an "African solution" is significant to curb problems of the continent. He also held talks with senior government officials and religious leaders during his five-day working visit to Khartoum and called for religious leaders to strengthen their efforts towards peace.

He served as a member of central committee of the World Council of Churches (WCC) and the Faith and Order commission, and attended the Nairobi assembly. Abune Paulos was one of the rare exceptionally educated Patriarchs in Ethiopian history because he had completed various degrees and received his doctoral degree at prestigious institutions. Abune Paulos was one of the seven presidents of WCC as well.

Abune Paulos served as an Honorary President of Religions for Peace, the world's largest and most representative multi-religious coalition, advancing common action among the world's religious communities for peace.

Abune Paulos was a Knight Grand Collar of The Order of The Eagle of Georgia and The Seamless Tunic of our Lord Jesus Christ, an order of the Royal family of Georgia.

== See also ==
- List of abunas of Ethiopia

Oriental Orthodox titles
Preceded by Abuna Merkorios	Patriarch of the Ethiopian Orthodox Tewahedo Church; 1992–2012	Succeeded by Abune Mathias; Patriarch of the Ethiopian Orthodox Tewahedo Church ---------------------------------------------------------------------------------- Abune Phillipos; After Autocephaly as Patriarch of the Eritrean Orthodox Tewahedo Church
