= Ethiopian Orthodox Church in Exile =

Church created following schism in 1991

- Classification: Eastern Christianity
- Orientation: Oriental Orthodoxy
- Scripture: Orthodox Tewahedo Bible
- Theology: Miaphysite
- Primate: Merkorios
- Language: Ge'ez
- Liturgy: Alexandrian rite
- Headquarters: Los Angeles
- Origin: 1991
- Merged into: Ethiopian Orthodox Church
- Defunct: 2018

The Ethiopian Orthodox Church in Exile was an autocephalous Oriental Orthodox church created in the wake of a schism in the Ethiopian Orthodox Church following the deposition of Patriarch Merkorios in 1991 and his exile to the United States.

== History ==
After the fall of the Derg regime in Ethiopia in 1991 and the installation of new authorities, Patriarch Merkorios abdicated. The Church then elected a new patriarch, Abuna Paulos. The former Patriarch, Abuna Merkorios, then settled abroad (first in Kenya and then in the United States). He later announced from his exile that his abdication had been made under coercion and that he was still the legitimate patriarch of the Ethiopian Orthodox Church. Several bishops followed him into exile and formed an alternative synod.

In July 2018, Ethiopian Prime Minister Abiy Ahmed visited the United States and announced an agreement between the official Ethiopian Orthodox Church led by Patriarch Mathias and Christian communities in the diaspora loyal to Patriarch Abuna Merkorios. The agreement provides for the return of Merkorios to his country where a residence was prepared for him, and that henceforth the official Church and the diaspora will form only one synod, thus bringing about the end of the exile.

== Presence around the world ==
The Church was present in the United States, Canada, Australia and Western Europe.

== See also ==
- List of abunas of Ethiopia
- Ethiopian Orthodox Church
- Oriental Orthodox Christianity
