= Abune Merkorios =

Ethiopian bishop and Patriarch (1938–2022)

His Holiness Abune Merkorios
- Patriarch and Catholicos of the Ethiopian Orthodox Tewahedo Church
- Abune Merkorios at his enthronement
- Native name: አቡነ መርቆሬዎስ
- Church: Ethiopian Orthodox Tewahedo Church
- Appointed: 1988
- Term ended: 2022
- Predecessor: Abuna Takla Haymanot
- Successor: Abuna Paulos (5th); Abune Mathias (6th)

Orders
- Consecration: Holy Trinity Cathedral

Personal details
- Born: Ze-Libanos Fanta; 14 June 1938 Amhara Governorate, Italian East Africa (now Amhara Region, Ethiopia)
- Died: 3 March 2022 (aged 83) Addis Ababa, Ethiopia
- Denomination: Oriental Orthodox
- Residence: Addis Ababa

Abune Merkorios (born Ze-Libanos Fanta; 14 June 1938 – 3 March 2022) was an Ethiopian bishop and the fourth Patriarch of the Ethiopian Orthodox Tewahedo Church, elected after the death of Abuna Takla Haymanot in May 1988. Merkorios remained Patriarch for three years until 1991, when the Ethiopian People's Revolutionary Democratic Front (EPRDF) overthrew the Communist military junta known as Derg in Addis Ababa. After spending almost three decades living in exile, he was allowed to return to Addis Ababa and be recognized as Patriarch alongside Abune Mathias.

== Early life ==
Known before his elevation to the episcopacy as Abba (Father) Ze-Libanos Fanta, he was born into the minor nobility of Begemder Province. He was considered something of a liturgical expert, and served for many years at Holy Trinity Cathedral in Addis Ababa. Abba Ze-Libanos was raised to the rank of Bishop by Patriarch Abuna Takla Haymanot in 1976 over his home province of Beghemidir (then known as Gondar Province), taking the name Merkorios. Abune Merkorios served as Archbishop of Gondar until he became Patriarch of Ethiopia in 1988. Abune Merkorios' tenure of Archbishop of Gondar included the period known as the "Red Terror" in Ethiopia, and which was carried out with particular brutality in the town and province of Gondar under the governorship of Melaku Teferra, a particularly notorious member of the Derg. Abune Merkorios would later face accusations of not only having kept silent during the horrors of the "Red Terror" in Gondar, but of having a particularly close relationship with Governor Melaku. In a sign of the favor of the Derg regime, in 1986, Abune Merkorios was appointed one of a very small and select group of clergy to serve as a member of the Shengo, the national parliament set up by the Derg when it proclaimed the People's Democratic Republic of Ethiopia that year. He remained a member of the parliament until his enthronement as Patriarch. These allegations of closeness to the Communist Derg regime helped undermine the Patriarch, when the Ethiopian People's Revolutionary Democratic Front (EPRDF) came to power.

== Abdication and exile ==
Abune Merkorios was ousted by EPRDF regime in 1991, particularly on the orders of then Prime Minister Tamrat Layne. He was followed on the throne of the Ethiopian Church by Abune Paulos, the fifth official patriarch of the church, although many Ethiopian churches in the diaspora continued to recognize Abune Merkorios as Patriarch in opposition to Paulos. The following year he fled to Kenya, later relocating to the United States in 1997, where churches had begun to secede from the synod in Ethiopia following the leadership of Abuna Yesehaq. These churches formed a synod in exile and eventually both synods were mutually excommunicated.

Efforts to heal the threatened schism had shown promising results through late 2011 and early 2012. However, the sudden deaths of both Patriarch Abune Paulos and Prime Minister Meles Zenawi caused efforts to slow down as the synod in Ethiopia went through a leadership transition. During the reconciliation negotiations, the synod in exile insisted that Abune Merkorios be allowed to resume the Patriarchal throne, something that neither the synod in Ethiopia nor the Ethiopian government was willing to consider. With the election of Abune Mathias as the 6th Patriarch of Ethiopia on 28 February 2013, reconciliation talks were ended for the time being.

== Reinstatement ==
With the encouragement of the newly elected Ethiopian Prime Minister Abiy Ahmed, reconciliation talks between the two rival synods began anew, and on 27 July 2018, representatives from both synods reached an agreement. According to the terms of the agreement, Abune Merkorios was reinstated as Patriarch alongside Abune Mathias, who will continue to be responsible for administrative duties, and the two synods were merged into one synod, with any excommunications between them lifted.

On 1 August 2018, Abune Merkorios entered Ethiopia for the first time in 26 years, flying together with Ethiopian Prime Minister Abiy Ahmed.

On 4 March 2022, Prime Minister Abiy Ahmed announced Abune Merkorios' death, thus ending the dual patriarchy after four years.

== See also ==
- List of abunas of Ethiopia

Oriental Orthodox titles
Preceded by Abuna Takla Haymanot	Patriarch of the Ethiopian Orthodox Tewahedo Church; 1988–1991	Succeeded by Abune Paulos
Preceded by Abune Mathias	Patriarch of the Ethiopian Orthodox Tewahedo Church; 2018–2022; With: Abune Mathias	Succeeded by Abune Mathias
