= Theological College of the Holy Trinity =

University in Addis Ababa, Ethiopia

Coordinates: 9°1′54″N 38°45′54″E

Holy Trinity University
- Type: University
- Established: 1942
- Religious affiliation: Ethiopian Orthodox Tewahedo Church
- President: His Eminence Abune Pilipos
- Location: Addis Ababa, Ethiopia
- Website: http://www.htu.edu.et

Holy Trinity University (HTU) (ቅድስት ሥላሴ ዩኒቨርሲቲ) is a theological school in Addis Ababa, Ethiopia. It provides religious and theological instruction to both clergy and lay members of the Ethiopian Orthodox Tewahedo Church. The current president is Abba Philipos, Archbishop of South Omo and Ari Zones. The institution also aims to serve as a center of theological and ecclesiastical study for all Oriental Orthodox Churches.
