= Mahibere Kidusan =

Organization within the Ethiopian Orthodox Tewahedo Church

Mahibere Kidusan ማኀበረ ቅዱሳን
- Mahibere Kidusan logo
- Address: 2QQ6+3GH, Sahie Silase St, Addis Ababa, Ethiopia
- Country: Ethiopia, North America
- Denomination: Ethiopian Orthodox Tewahedo Church
- Website: eotcmk.org/a/

History
- Founded: 1990; 36 years ago

Mahibere Kidusan (Ge'ez: ማኀበረ ቅዱሳን) is an organization within the Ethiopian Orthodox Tewahedo Church. Its inception dates back to the late 1970s, when a few university students encouraged fellow youth in higher education to join Sunday schools and learn the teachings of the Church. Later, this initiative was strengthened by students who had been trained at the Ziway Hamere Birhan St. Gabriel Monastery Clergy Training center under the guidance of the then Archbishop of Shewa, Abune Gorgorios II. The movement continued at the Bilatie military camp bringing together students from higher institutions across the country. A year later, in 1990, with the blessing of the Church Fathers, the association was established under the name “Mahibere Kidusan” within the Sunday School Department of the Ethiopian Orthodox Tewahedo Church. Since then, the association has been providing spiritual services. Currently, the organization has thousands of members worldwide and operates several schools under the name Abune Gorgorios Schools. it also provides religious education to students in higher institutions.

== Beliefs and practices ==
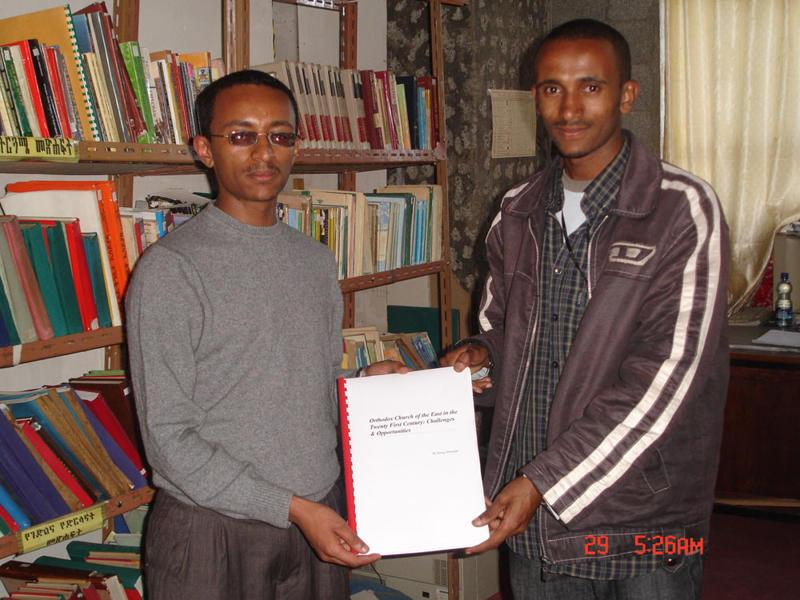
Yonas Geredew, an ambassador correspondent to Ethiopia and Africa, presenting a copy of management book of Oregon Catholic Press to Head of Library of Mahibere Kidusan Sunday School

The organization is known for opposing the Tehadiso sect, a reformist Protestant group that rejects the core teachings of the Ethiopian Orthodox Tewahedo Church.

On May 21, 2023, the Ethiopian Media Authority temporarily suspended Mahibere Kidusan TV for allegedly inciting religious conflict during a Holy Synod meeting following the unlawful appointment of new bishops by rogue bishops who opposed the Church's Holy Synod decision.
