= Abune Mathias =

Patriarch of the Ethiopian Orthodox Tewahedo Church since 2013

His Holiness Abune Mathias I
- Patriarch and Catholicos of Ethiopia, Archbishop of Axum and Echege of the See of Takla Haymanot
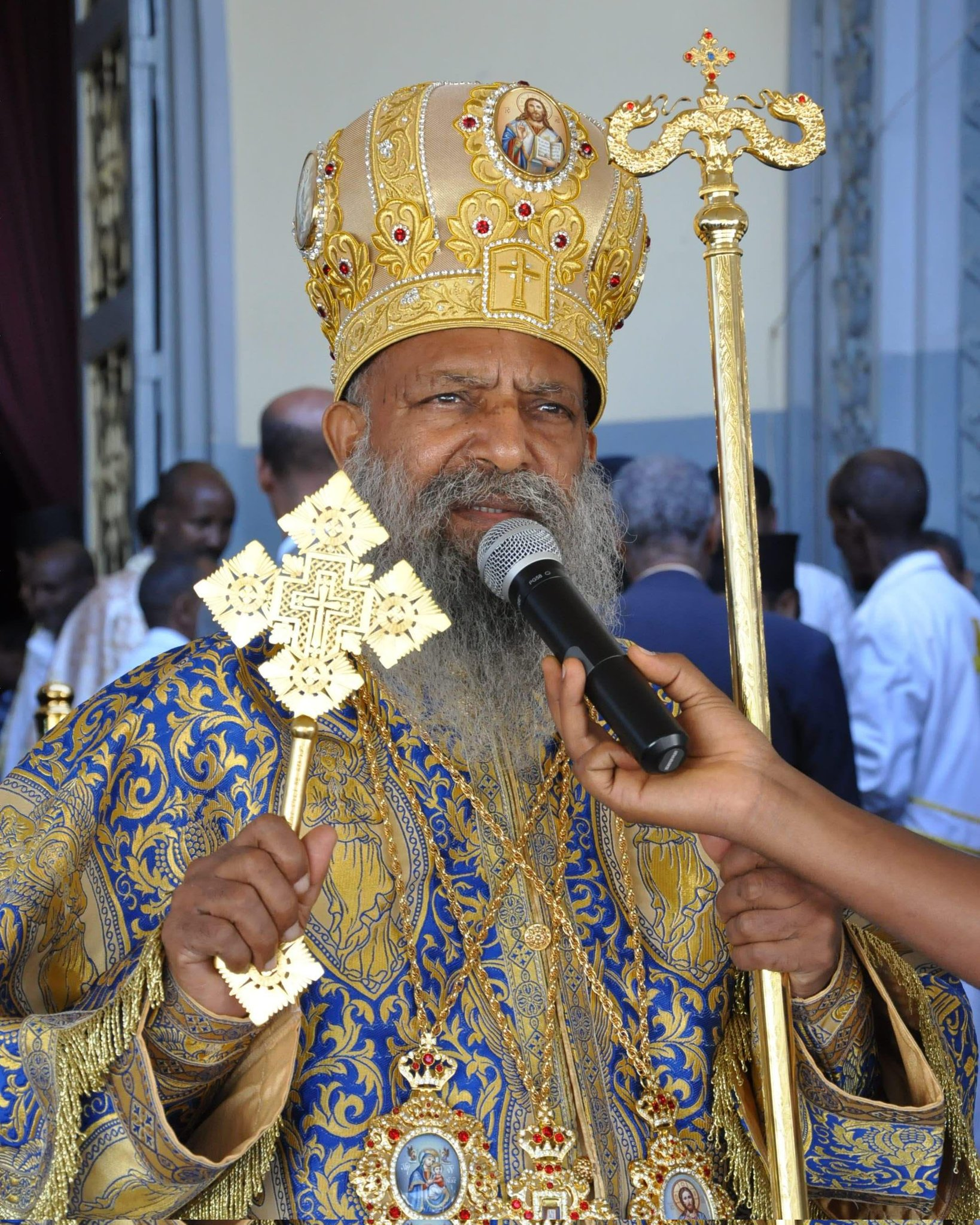
- Mathias in 2021
- Native name: ማትያስ ቀዳማዊ
- Church: Ethiopian Orthodox Tewahedo Church
- Archdiocese: Aksum and All Ethiopia
- Appointed: 3 March 2013
- Predecessor: Abune Paulos

Orders
- Ordination: 1962 (priesthood)
- Consecration: 21 January 1979 by Abuna Takla Haymanot

Personal details
- Born: Teklemariam Asrat; 5 January 1941 (age 85) Agame, Tigray Province, Ethiopian Empire
- Denomination: Oriental Orthodoxy (Ethiopian Tewahedo)
- Residence: EOTC Patriarchate Head Office
- Signature: Mathias I's signature

Abune Mathias I (born Teklemariam Asrat; 5 January 1941) is the sixth and current Patriarch of the Ethiopian Orthodox Tewahedo Church since 2013. His full title is "His Holiness Abune Mathias I, Sixth Patriarch and Catholicos of Ethiopia, Archbishop of Axum and Ichege of the See of Saint Taklehaimanot".

== Early life ==
Teklemariam Asrat was born on 5 January 1941 in Agame, a district of Tigray Province, in Sebuha county.

Teklemariam was ordained as deacon in 1954 by Abune Markos, the then Archbishop of Eritrea. Deacon Teklemariam served in several capacities at the Chohé monastery, in Tembien district of Tigray, where he stayed for most of the subsequent 14 years. In 1963, he was ordained as a priest and monk at Chohé. Now known as Abba Teklemariam, he left the monastery to further his education in Addis Ababa, and served in the Holy Trinity Cathedral from 1971 to 1976. During this time, the government of Emperor Haile Selassie was overthrown, and the then Patriarch Abune Tewophilos was arrested and subsequently executed by the Derg military regime.

Following the enthronement of Patriarch Teklehaimanot to replace Patriarch Tewophilos, Abba Teklemariam was appointed to serve as the Patriarchal Vicar to the new Patriarch, and functioned as his closest aide. In 1978, as the Derg identified the senior Archbishops and Bishops with the fallen Imperial government, it ordered that all the senior hierarchs go into retirement. As a result, Patriarch Abune Tekle Haimanot had to anoint 14 new bishops to fill the vacancies left by the retiring hierarchs. Abba Teklemariam was thus anointed as the new bishop of the Ethiopian Orthodox Church in Jerusalem and the Holy Land in 1978 and adopted the new episcopal name and title of Abune Mathias. While serving in Jerusalem he was elevated from Bishop to Archbishop.

In early 1980, Abune Mathias became the first leader of the church to issue a denunciation of the rule of the communist Derg. Consequently, he lived abroad for more than thirty years. He pronounced an anathema against Mengistu Haile Mariam and the members of the regime, and then went into exile. Abune Mathias eventually settled in Washington, D.C., where he presided over an Ethiopian Orthodox Tewahedo Church made up of exiles who had fled the Ethiopian revolution, and continued to broadcast messages against the Derg regime on Voice of America.

In 1992, Abune Mathias returned to Ethiopia following the fall of the Derg and of Patriarch Abuna Merkorios to retake his seat in the Holy Synod. Following the enthronement of Patriarch Abune Paulos, Abune Mathias was named Archbishop of North America. Later, the Archdiocese was divided and Abune Mattias served as Archbishop of the United States, when Canada became a separate archdiocese. In 2009, the Archdiocese of the United States was divided again into three new Archdioceses, and Abune Mathias was asked to return to take up his former Archdiocese of Jerusalem. Before departing for the Holy Land, Abune Mathias played a key role in initiating attempts to reach a reconciliation between the Holy Synod in Addis Ababa, and the exiled Synod in the United States headed by former Patriarch Abune Merkorios.

== Patriarch ==
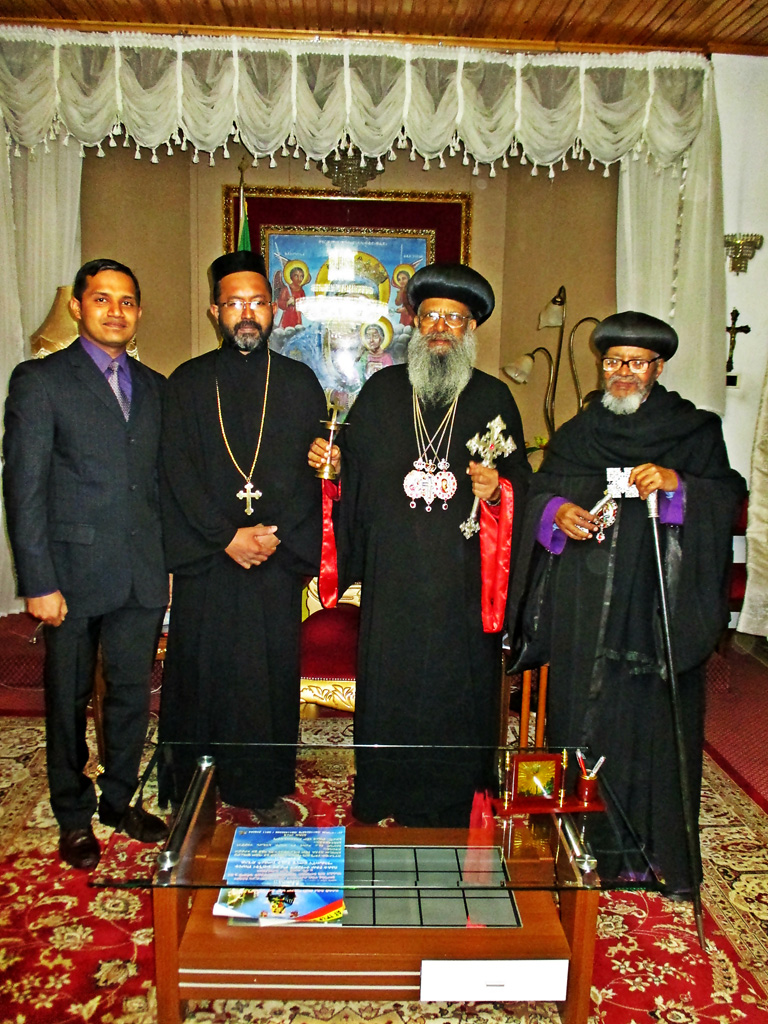
OCP Secretary George Alexander with Patriarch Abune Mathias of Ethiopia (with long red cuffs), Abune Thimotheos (Dean of Holy Trinity University College, with short purple cuffs), and Fr. Dr. Jossi Jacob (IMOC Delegate and Faculty at Holy Trinity College)

Abune Mathias became the 6th Patriarch of the Ethiopian Orthodox Tewahedo Church in the election held on 28 February 2013 where he received 500 of the 806 votes cast by a college of electors representing various sections of the Church.

Following an agreement made on 27 July 2018, the previously exiled Abune Merkorios was reinstated and served as co-patriarch with Abune Mathias until Merkorios' death on 3 March 2022. On 22 January 2023, Abune Sawrios, a member of Ethiopian Orthodox Tewahedo Holy Synod attempted to overthrow Abune Mathias via emerging as "Patriarchate of Oromia", along with a secret group of bishops. Sawrios previously stood for election in the position of Head of the Ethiopian church in June, securing seven votes and coming in third. Abune Mathias summoned all bishops to discuss the incident. Mathias called the government to implement security and measures to address the issues.

== See also ==
- List of abunas of Ethiopia

Oriental Orthodox titles
Preceded by Abune Paulos	Patriarch of the Ethiopian Orthodox Tewahedo Church; 2013–present With: Abune Merkorios 2018–2022	Incumbent
