= Ethiopian Orthodox Tewahedo Church =

Oriental Orthodox Church denomination of Ethiopia

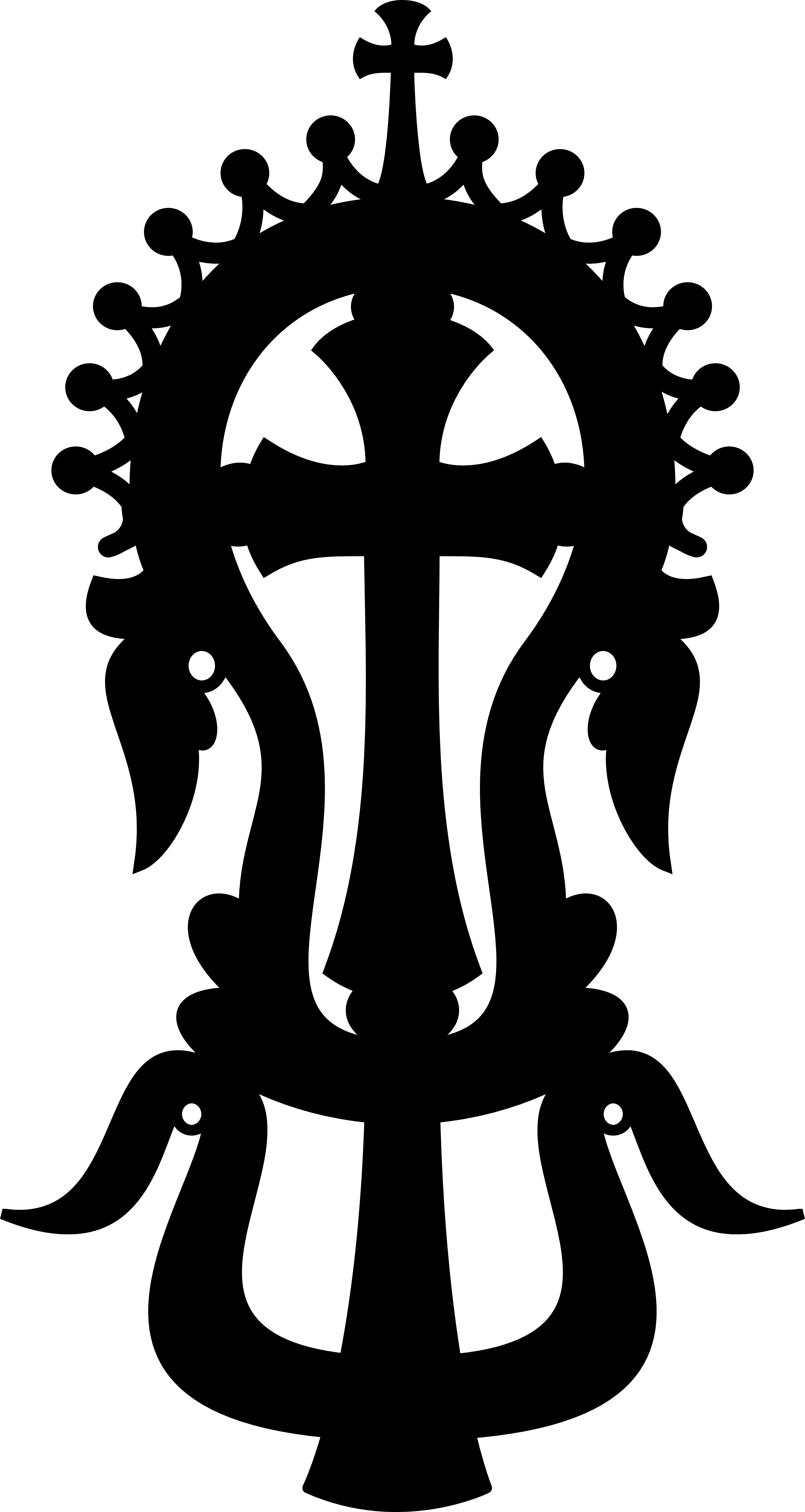
Ethiopian Orthodox Tewahedo Church
- የኢትዮጵያ ኦርቶዶክስ ተዋሕዶ ቤተ ክርስቲያን; Yä-ityop'ya ortodoks täwaḥədo betä krəstiyan
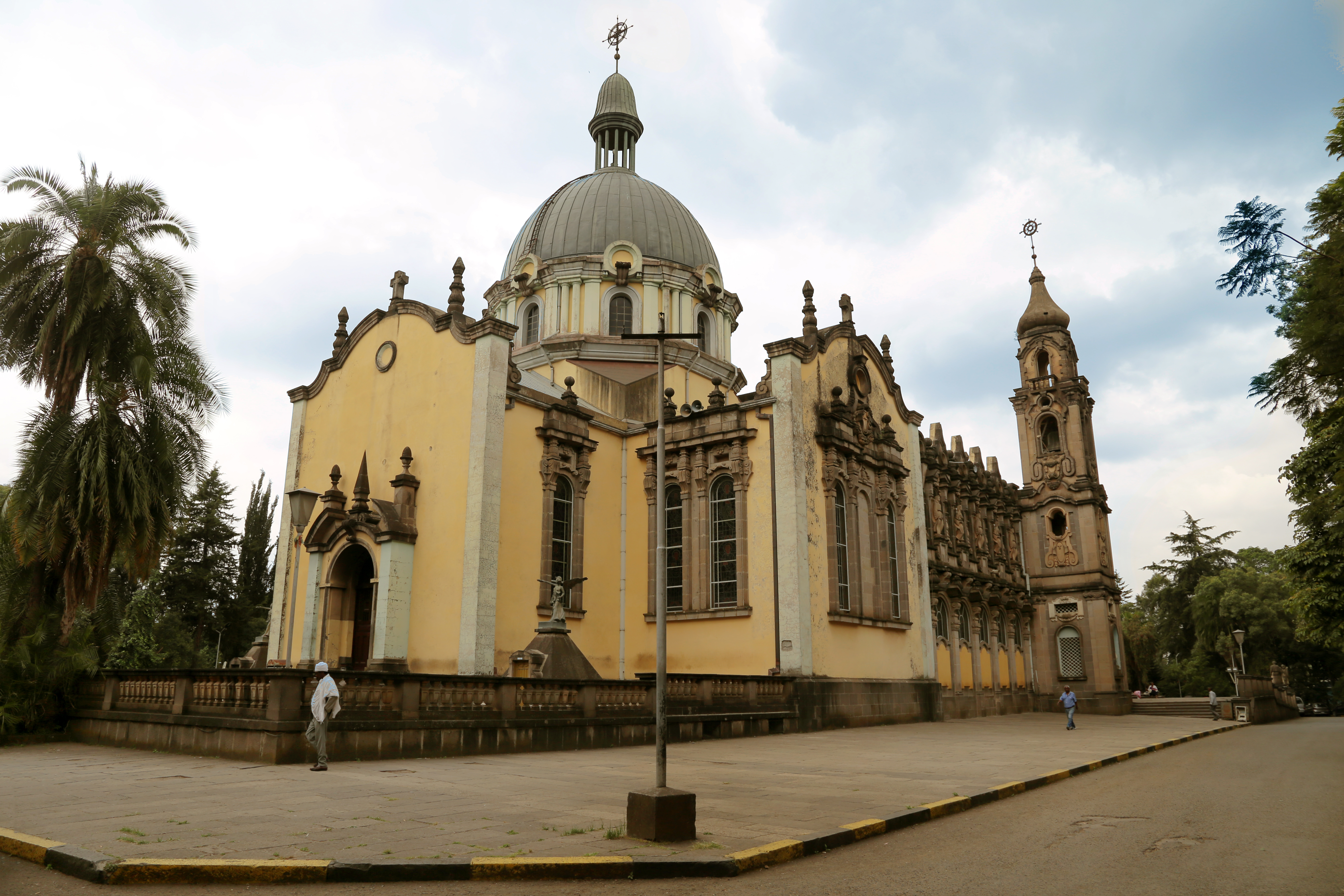
- Holy Trinity Cathedral in Addis Ababa, the seat of the Ethiopian Orthodox Tewahedo Church
- Abbreviation: EOTC
- Classification: Christianity
- Orientation: Oriental Orthodox (Orthodox Tewahedo)
- Scripture: Orthodox Tewahedo Bible
- Theology: Oriental Orthodox theology
- Polity: Episcopal
- Patriarch: Mathias
- Region: Ethiopia and Ethiopian diaspora
- Language: Geʽez, Amharic, Oromo, Tigrinya, Gurage, Sidama
- Liturgy: Alexandrian
- Headquarters: Holy Trinity Cathedral, Addis Ababa, Ethiopia
- Founder: Frumentius according to Ethiopian Orthodox tradition
- Origin: 4th century Kingdom of Aksum
- Independence: 1959
- Separated from: Coptic Orthodox Church
- Branched from: Coptic Orthodox Church
- Separations: Eritrean Orthodox Tewahedo Church (1991)
- Members: 60 million worldwide (38 million–51 million in Ethiopia)
- Other name: Ethiopian Orthodox Church

The Ethiopian Orthodox Tewahedo Church (EOTC) (Amharic: የኢትዮጵያ ኦርቶዶክስ ተዋሕዶ ቤተ ክርስቲያን, romanized: Yä-ityop'ya ortodoks täwaḥədo betä krəstiyan), is the largest of the Oriental Orthodox Churches. The EOTC is the first indigenous Christian church from sub-Saharan Africa and precedes the arrival of Western and European colonizers, who mostly followed Catholic and Protestant denominations, to the region by more than a millennium. It is also one of only three universally recognized Oriental Orthodox churches in Africa alongside the Coptic Orthodox Church of Alexandria and Eritrean Orthodox Tewahedo Church—and one of only two in sub-Saharan Africa—as the status of the Tigrayan Orthodox Tewahedo Church is still disputed by the broader Oriental Orthodox communion. Dating back to the Christianization of the Kingdom of Aksum by Coptic Orthodox missionaries in 330; it has between 38 million and 51 million adherents in Ethiopia, and 60 million members worldwide. It is a founding member of the World Council of Churches. The Ethiopian Orthodox Tewahedo Church is in communion with the other Oriental Orthodox churches (the Eritrean Orthodox Tewahedo Church, the Coptic Orthodox Church of Alexandria, the Malankara Orthodox Syrian Church, the Armenian Apostolic Church, and the Syriac Orthodox Church of Antioch).

The Ethiopian Orthodox Tewahedo Church had been administratively part of the Coptic Orthodox Church of Alexandria from the first half of the 4th century until 1959, when it was granted autocephaly with its own patriarch by Cyril VI of Alexandria, pope of the Coptic Orthodox Church.

Tewahedo (Ge'ez: ተዋሕዶ täwaḥədo) is a Geʽez word meaning "united as one." This word refers to the Oriental Orthodox belief in miaphysitism, meaning one perfectly unified nature of Christ, i.e., a complete union of the divine and human natures into one nature is self-evident to accomplish the divine salvation of mankind, as opposed to the "two natures of Christ" belief commonly held by the Chalcedonian Catholic, Eastern Orthodox, Anglican, Lutheran, Reformed, and most other Protestant churches (which are predominant among Christians in Europe, the Americas, and most of sub-Saharan Africa and Asia), as well as by the non-Chalcedonian Church of the East, but not by most Restorationist denominations. The Oriental Orthodox Churches adhere to a miaphysite Christological view followed by Cyril of Alexandria, its leading proponent in the Christological debates of the 4th and 5th centuries, who advocated "mia physis tou Theou logou sesarkōmenē", or "one (mia) nature of the Word of God incarnate" (μία φύσις τοῦ θεοῦ λόγου σεσαρκωμένη) and a hypostatic union (ἕνωσις καθ' ὑπόστασιν, henōsis kath' hypostasin). The distinction of this stance was that the incarnate Christ has one nature, but that one nature is of the two natures, divine and human, and retains all the characteristics of both after the union.

Miaphysitism holds that in the one person of Jesus Christ, divinity and humanity are united in one (μία, mia) nature (φύσις - "physis") without separation, without confusion, without alteration and without mixing where Christ is consubstantial with God the Father. Around 500 bishops in the patriarchates of Alexandria, Antioch, and Jerusalem refused to accept the dyophysitism (two natures) doctrine decreed by the Council of Chalcedon in 451, an incident that resulted in the second major split in the main body of the Catholic-Orthodox Church in the Roman Empire.

== Name ==
Tewahedo (Ge'ez: ተዋሕዶ täwaḥədo) is a Geʽez word meaning "being made one" or "unified" (see also the Islamic concept of monotheism, tawhid). This word refers to the Oriental Orthodox belief in the miaphysite nature of Christ (one composite union of the divine and human natures), as opposed to the dyophysite nature of the hypostatic union (two unmixed, but unseparated divine and human natures), which is the belief held by the Catholic Church and the Eastern Orthodox Church.

The Oriental Orthodox Churches (to which the Ethiopian Orthodox Tewahedo Church belongs) fall under the umbrella of non-Chalcedonian Christianity, due to their theological rejection of the Council of Chalcedon, the church council following the Council of Ephesus held in 451. The Oriental beliefs are sometimes incorrectly described by outsiders as monophysite (one singular divine nature of Christ); however, the Ethiopian Church and other Oriental Orthodox Churches adhere to miaphysitism ("one united nature"), and the Ethiopians argue that the monophysite epithet is offensive.

== History ==
=== Origins ===
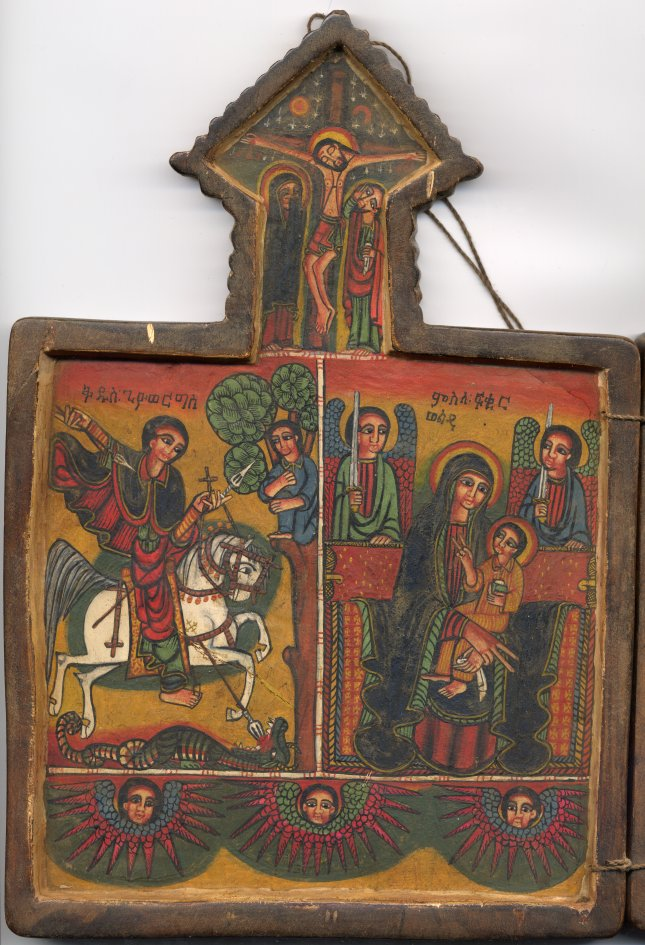
Ethiopian Orthodox icon depicting Saint George, the Crucifixion, and the Virgin Mary

John Chrysostom speaks of the "Ethiopians present in Jerusalem" as being able to understand the preaching of Saint Peter described in Acts 2:38. Possible missions of some of the apostles in the lands now called Ethiopia are also reported as early as the 4th century. Socrates of Constantinople includes Ethiopia in his list as one of the regions preached by Matthew the Apostle, where a specific mention of "Ethiopia south of the Caspian Sea" can be confirmed in some traditions such as the Roman Catholic Church among others. Ethiopian Church tradition tells that Bartholomew accompanied Matthew in a mission which lasted for at least three months. These missions are depicted in paintings by Francesco Trevisan (1650–1740) and Marco Benefial (1688–1764) in the Church of St. Matthew in Pisa.

The earliest account of an Ethiopian converted to the faith in the New Testament books is a royal official baptized by Philip the Evangelist (distinct from Philip the Apostle), one of the Seven Deacons (Acts 8:26–27):

Then the angel of the Lord said to Philip, Start out and go south to the road that leads down from Jerusalem to Gaza. So he set out and was on his way when he caught sight of an Ethiopian. This man was a eunuch, a high official of the Kandake (Candace) Queen of Ethiopia in charge of all her treasure. (Acts, 8:26–27)

The passage continues by describing how Philip helped the Ethiopian treasurer understand a passage from the Book of Isaiah that the Ethiopian was reading. After Philip interpreted the passage as prophecy referring to Jesus Christ, the Ethiopian requested that Philip baptize him, and Philip did so. The Ethiopic version of this verse reads "Hendeke" (ህንደኬ həndäke); Queen Gersamot Hendeke VII was the Queen of Ethiopia from c. 42 to 52. Where the possibility of gospel missions by the Ethiopian eunuch cannot be directly inferred from the Books of the New Testament, Irenaeus of Lyons around 180 AD writes that "Simon Backos" preached the good news in his homeland outlining also the theme of his preaching as being the coming in flesh of God that "was preached to you all before." The same kind of witness is shared by 3rd and 4th century writers such as Eusebius of Caesarea and Origen of Alexandria.

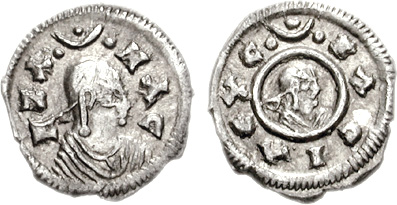
Coin of King Ezana, under whom Early Christianity became the established church of the Kingdom of Aksum

Early Christianity became the established church of the Ethiopian Axumite Kingdom under king Ezana in the 4th century when priesthood and the sacraments were brought for the first time through a Syrian Greek named Frumentius, known by the local population in Ethiopia as "Selama, Kesaté Birhan" ("Father of Peace, Revealer of Light"). As a youth, Frumentius had been shipwrecked with his brother Aedesius on the Eritrean coast. The brothers managed to be brought to the royal court, where they rose to positions of influence and baptized Emperor Ezana. Frumentius is also believed to have established the first monastery in Ethiopia, named Dabba Selama after him. In 2016, archaeologists excavated a 4th-century AD basilica (radio-carbon dated) in northeastern Ethiopia at a site called Beta Samati. This is the earliest known physical evidence of a church in sub-Saharan Africa.

=== Middle Ages ===
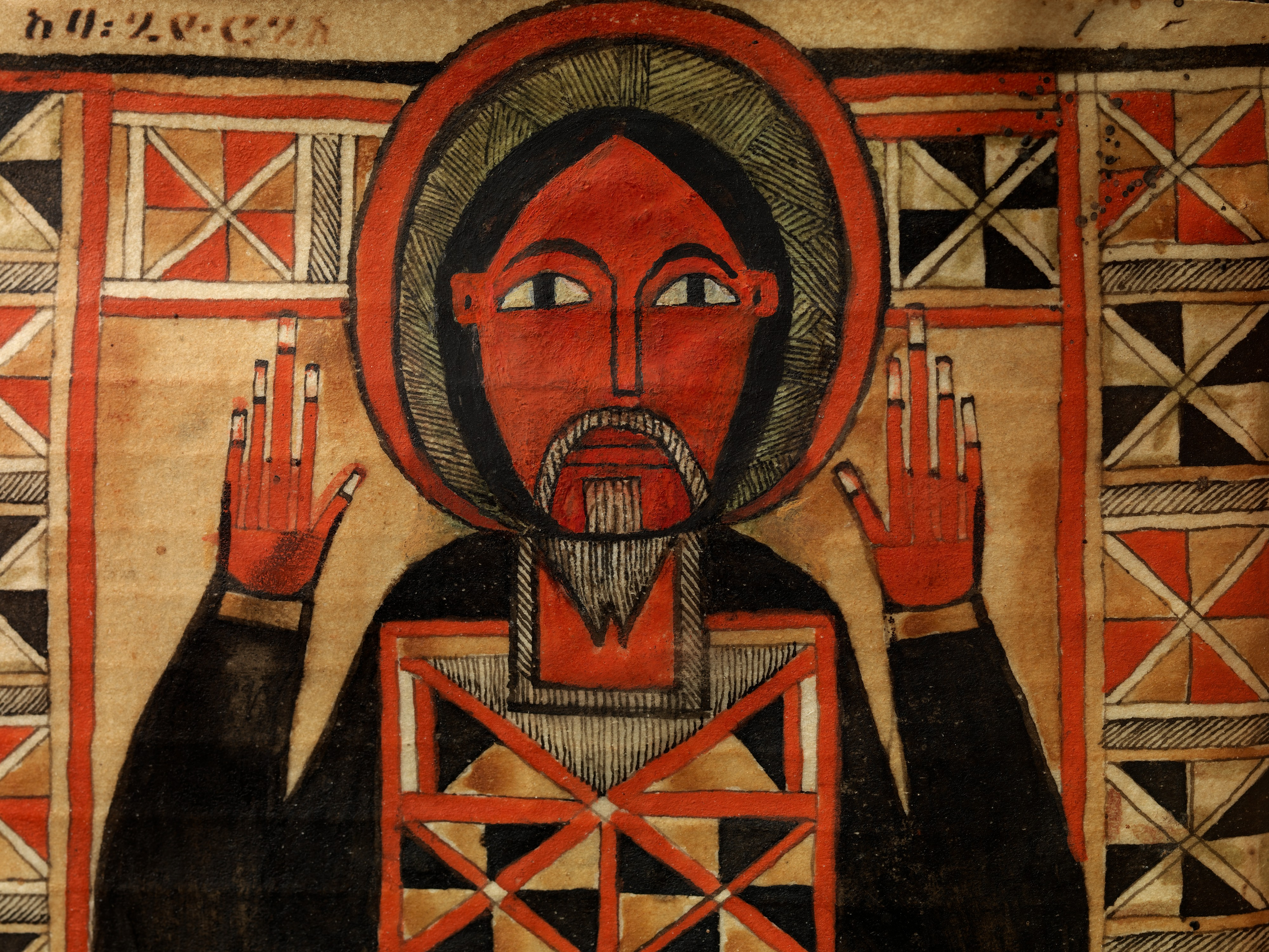
Late 17th century portrait of Giyorgis by Baselyos

Union with the Coptic Orthodox Church of Alexandria continued after the Arab conquest of Egypt. Abu Saleh records in the 12th century that the patriarch sent letters twice a year to the kings of Abyssinia (Ethiopia) and Nubia, until Al Hakim stopped the practice. Cyril, 67th patriarch, sent Severus as bishop, with orders to put down polygamy and to enforce the observance of canonical consecration for all churches. These examples show the close relations of the two churches throughout the Middle Ages. In 1439, in the reign of Zara Yaqob, a religious discussion between Giyorgis and a French visitor led to the dispatch of an embassy from Ethiopia to the Vatican.

During the Middle Ages, the Ethiopian Church also witnessed the rise of influential monastic movements that challenged established religious and political norms. Abba Ewostatewos founded the so-called Ewostathian movement, which emphasized strict Sabbath observance and monastic independence, leading to tensions with the ecclesiastical hierarchy and the Coptic Orthodox Church. However, in the mid-15th century, his disciples secured recognition from the Alexandrian patriarchate, and the practice of observing both Saturday and Sunday as Sabbaths was officially accepted in Ethiopia. A century later, Abba Estifanos of Gwendagwende led the Stephanite movement, which rejected veneration of the cross and royal authority over the Church, provoking harsh persecution under Emperor Zara Yaqob. Beyond doctrinal disagreements, the Stephanites articulated a radical critique of imperial authority and the sacralization of kingship, which some scholars interpret as an early Ethiopian form of religious dissent. These currents illustrate the diversity of theological and ecclesiastical debates within Ethiopian Christianity during the medieval period.

=== Jesuit interim ===
The period of Jesuit influence, which broke the connection with Egypt, began a new chapter in church history. The initiative in Roman Catholic missions to Ethiopia was taken not by Rome, but by Portugal, in the course of a conflict with the Islamic Ottoman Empire and the Sultanate of Adal for the command of the trade route to India via the Red Sea.

In 1507, Mateus—or Matthew—an Armenian, had been sent as an Ethiopian envoy to Portugal. In 1520, an embassy under Dom Rodrigo de Lima landed in Ethiopia. An account of the Portuguese mission, which lasted for several years, was written by Francisco Álvares, its chaplain.

Later, Ignatius Loyola wished to take up the task of conversion, but was forbidden to do so. Instead, the pope sent out João Nunes Barreto as patriarch of the East Indies, with Andrés de Oviedo as bishop; and from Goa envoys went to Ethiopia, followed by Oviedo himself, to secure the king's adherence to Rome. After repeated failures some measure of success was achieved under Emperor Susenyos I, but not until 1624 did the Emperor make formal submission to the pope. Susenyos made Roman Catholicism the official state religion but was met with heavy resistance by his subjects and by the authorities of the Ethiopian Orthodox Church, and eventually had to abdicate in 1632 in favour of his son, Fasilides, who promptly restored Ethiopian Orthodox Christianity as the state religion. He then in 1633 expelled the Jesuits, and in 1665 Fasilides ordered that all Jesuit books (the Books of the Franks) be burned.

=== Influence on the Reformation ===
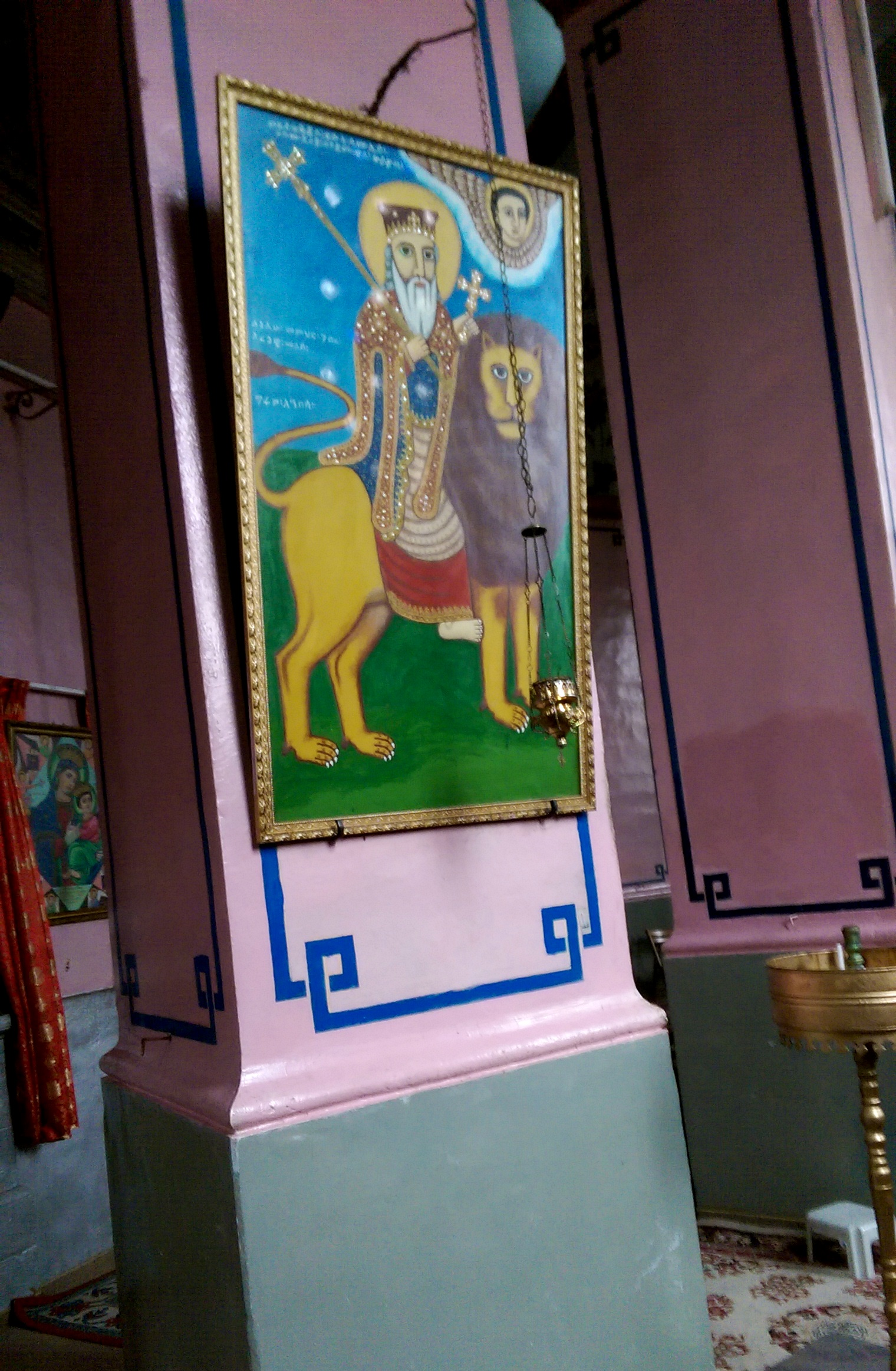
Icon of Samuel of Waldebba, a 15th-century Ethiopian monk and ascetic of the Ethiopian Orthodox Church

David Daniels has suggested that the Ethiopian Church has had a stronger impact on the Reformation than most scholars acknowledge. For Martin Luther, who spearheaded the Reformation, Daniels says "the Ethiopian Church conferred legitimacy on Luther's emerging Protestant vision of a church outside the authority of the Roman Catholic papacy" as it was "an ancient church with direct ties to the apostles". According to Daniels, Martin Luther saw that the Ethiopian Orthodox Church practiced elements of faith including "communion under both kinds, vernacular Scriptures, and married clergy" and these practices became customary in the Lutheran churches. The Ethiopian Church also rejected papal supremacy, purgatory and indulgences, which the Lutherans disagreed with, and thus for Luther, the Ethiopian Church was the "true forerunner of Protestantism". Luther believed that the Ethiopian Church kept true apostolic practices which the Lutherans would adopt through reading the scriptures.

In 1534, a cleric of the Ethiopian Orthodox Tewahedo Church, Michael the Deacon, met with Martin Luther and affirmed the Augsburg Confession, saying "This is a good creed, that is, faith". In addition, Martin Luther stated that the Lutheran Mass agreed with that used by the Ethiopian Orthodox Church. As a result, Luther invited the Ethiopian Church and Michael to full fellowship.

=== Recent history ===
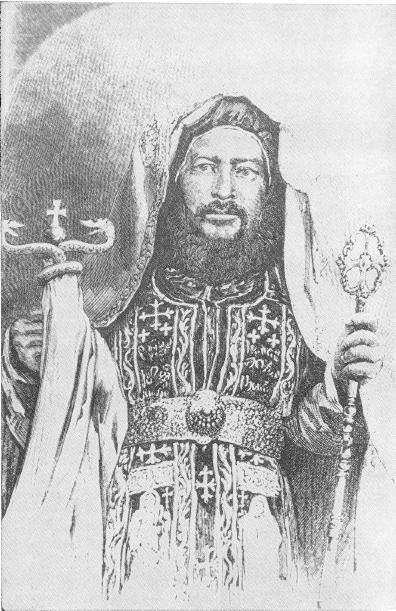
Engraving of Abuna Salama III, head of the Ethiopian Orthodox Tewahedo Church (1841–1867)

In modern times, the Ethiopian Church has experienced a series of developments. The 19th century witnessed the publication of the first Amharic translation of the Bible, having previously only been written in Ge'ez. Largely the work of Abu Rumi over ten years in Cairo, the Amharic version, with some changes, held sway until Emperor Haile Selassie ordered a new translation in 1962. Haile Selassie also played a prominent role in further reforms of the church, which included encouraging the distribution of Abu Rumi's translation throughout Ethiopia, as well as his promotion of improved education of clergy, a significant step in the Emperor's effort being the founding of the Theological College of the Holy Trinity Church in December 1944. A third development came after Haile Selassie's issuing of Decree Number 2 on 30 November 1942, a new law reforming the church. The primary objectives of this decree were to put the finances of the church in order, to create a central fund for its activities, and to set forth requirements for the appointment of clergy, which had been fairly lax until then.

The Coptic and Ethiopian churches reached an agreement on 13 July 1948 that led to complete autocephaly for the Ethiopian Church. Five bishops were immediately consecrated by the pope of the Coptic Orthodox Church, empowered to elect a new patriarch for their church, and the successor to Abuna Qerellos IV would henceforth have the power to consecrate new bishops. This promotion was completed when Coptic Orthodox Pope Joseph II consecrated Abuna Basilios on 14 January 1951. In 1959, Pope Cyril VI of Alexandria further crowned Basilios as the first patriarch of Ethiopia.

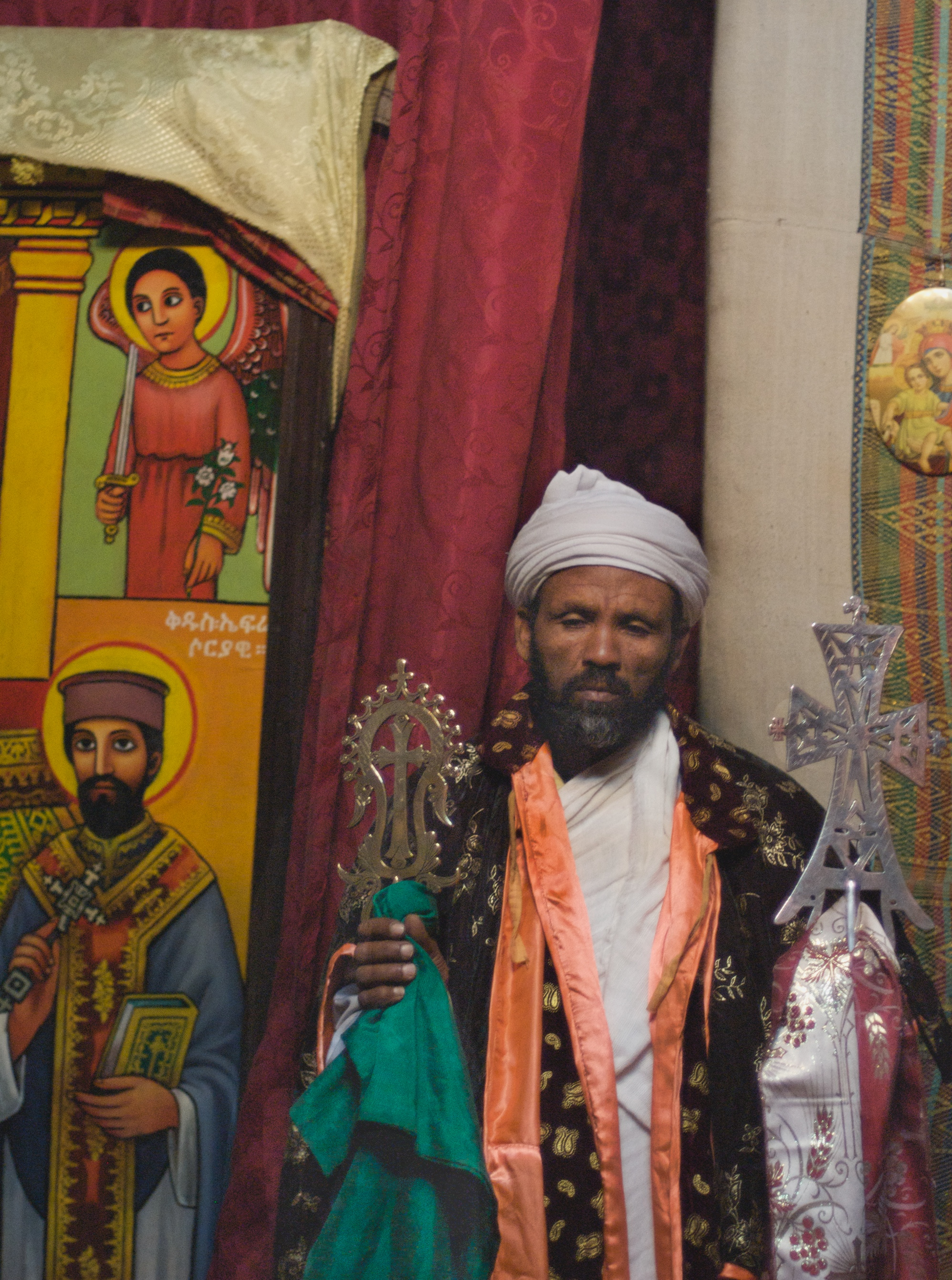
An Ethiopian Orthodox priest displays the processional crosses.

Abuna Basilios died in 1970, and was succeeded that year by Abuna Theophilos. With the Ethiopian Revolution in 1974, the Ethiopian Orthodox Tewahedo Church was disestablished as the state church, and the new Derg government began nationalizing property and land owned by the Church. Abuna Theophilos was arrested in 1976 by the Marxist military junta and secretly executed in 1979. The government forced the Church to elect a new patriarch, and Abuna Takla Haymanot was chosen; however, the Coptic Orthodox Church in Egypt refused to recognize Abuna Takla Haymanot on the grounds that the Synod of the Ethiopian Church had not voluntarily removed Abuna Theophilos and that the Ethiopian government had not publicly acknowledged his death, and he was thus still the legitimate patriarch of Ethiopia. Formal relations between the two churches were suspended, although they remained in communion with each other, and only resumed on 13 July 2007.

Abuna Takla Haymanot proved to be less accommodating to the Derg regime than they had hoped, so when he died in 1988, a new patriarch with closer ties to the regime was sought. Ze-Libanos Fanta, the Archbishop of Gondar and a member of the Derg-controlled Ethiopian Parliament, was elected and enthroned as Abune Merkorios, the fourth patriarch of Ethiopia. Following the fall of the Derg regime in 1991 and the coming to power of the Ethiopian People's Revolutionary Democratic Front government, Abune Merkorios abdicated under public pressure. The Church then elected a new patriarch in 1992, Abune Paulos, who was recognized by the pope of the Coptic Orthodox Church. The abdicated Abune Merkorios then fled abroad, first to Kenya and then the United States, announcing from exile that his abdication had been made under duress and thus he was still the legitimate patriarch of Ethiopia. Several bishops followed him into exile and formed a break-away alternate church, the Ethiopian Orthodox Church in Exile (1991–2018), headquartered in Los Angeles. The Eritrean Orthodox Tewahedo Church was granted autocephaly from the Ethiopian Orthodox Church on 28 September 1993 following ratification by pope of the Coptic Orthodox Church, Shenouda III, though the two churches remain in full communion. This split drew criticism from who that saw it as a disintegration of the spiritual heritage of Ethiopia.

There are many Ethiopian Orthodox churches located throughout the United States and in other countries to which Ethiopians have migrated.

Abune Paulos died on 16 August 2012, and on 28 February 2013, a college of electors assembled in Addis Ababa elected Abune Mathias as the sixth patriarch of Ethiopia.

On 25 July 2018, delegates from the Ethiopian Orthodox Tewahedo Church announced reunification with delegates from the breakaway Ethiopian Orthodox Church in Exile, in Washington, D.C. Declaring the end to the twenty-six-year-old schism, the Tewahedo Church announced that it acknowledged two patriarchs of Ethiopia, Abune Merkorios as the fourth patriarch of Ethiopia, and Abune Mathias as the sixth patriarch of Ethiopia (the fifth patriarch of Ethiopia, Abune Paulos, had died in 2012). Abune Merkorios, the fourth patriarch of Ethiopia and head of the former break-away Ethiopian Orthodox Church in Exile, died on 3 March 2022.

On 7 May 2021, a group of Tigrayan priests and bishops announced the secession of the regional clergy from the Ethiopian Orthodox Tewahedo Church (EOTC) to establish the Tigrayan Orthodox Tewahedo Church (TOTC). The split was driven by grievances over the EOTC holy synod's perceived alignment with the federal government during the Tigray War (2020–2022), which many Tigrayans accused of legitimizing state violence and remaining silent over atrocities committed against civilians. The move was also justified by the extensive destruction of churches and monasteries in Tigray during the conflict, often at the hands of Eritrean troops allied with the Ethiopian army. Massacres of civilians around Axum's Church of Our Lady Mary of Zion, bombings of sites such as the 6th-century Debre Damo monastery, and the widespread pillage of sacred objects—including manuscripts, icons, and golden crosses—were documented by international human rights groups. Many stolen treasures were reportedly transported into Eritrea, reinforcing accusations that the war was accompanied by cultural erasure.

Significantly, Patriarch Abune Mathias—the current patriarch who is himself a Tigrayan—broke ranks with the Holy Synod by publicly denouncing the conflict as a "genocide" against Tigrayans, lamenting that his attempts to issue statements had been censored by church authorities in Addis Ababa. For the Tigrayan clergy, the silence—or in some cases, the complicity—of the Synod in the face of massacres, looting, and the destruction of holy sites contrasted sharply with the patriarch's testimony, further underscoring the need for an autonomous church that could defend the religious and cultural heritage of the Tigrayan people.

On 22 January 2023, an attempt to overthrow Abune Mathias was failed following a secret formation of new 26-made bishop Synod led by Abune Sawiros in Oromia Region diocese, such as in Haro Beale Wold Church in Woliso, and nine bishops of diocese outside the region. The patriarchate called it an "illegal appointment", where Abune Mathias decried it as "great event that has targeted the church". After not apologising for the illegal ordination, three Archbishops were excommunicated by the Holy Synod on 26 January. On 31 January 2023, Prime Minister Abiy Ahmed convened a discussion surrounding the incident where he responded that he was ready to resolve the conflict. The speech led backlash from the Holy Synod and accused his government of meddling in the church in reference to separation of church and state in the Article 11 of the FDRE Constitution.

On 4 February, three people were reportedly killed in Shashemene by the Oromia Special Forces. According Tewahedo Media Center (TMC), two Orthodox youth were killed and four others were injured by the Oromo Special Forces. Abune Henok, Archbishop of Addis Ababa Diocese described it as "shameful and heart-wrenching". In response to grievance, numerous celebrities expressed their solidarity to the church via social media and other platforms and donned black clothing during three-days Fast of Nineveh. On 9 February, the government imposed restrictions on social sites targeted to Facebook, Messenger, Telegram and TikTok. On the next day, the delegation of Synod held an urgent meeting with Abiy at his office, which resulted in condemnation of the proclaimed Oromia Synod from Abiy. On 12 February, a nationwide protest was postponed. Abune Petros, the Secretary of the Holy Synod announced that the demonstration would be postponed following peaceful talks with the Prime Minister and a government agreement to solve the problem. On 15 February, the church reached an agreement with the illegally ordinated synod. The government lifted the internet ban after five months on 17 July 2023.

== Traditions ==
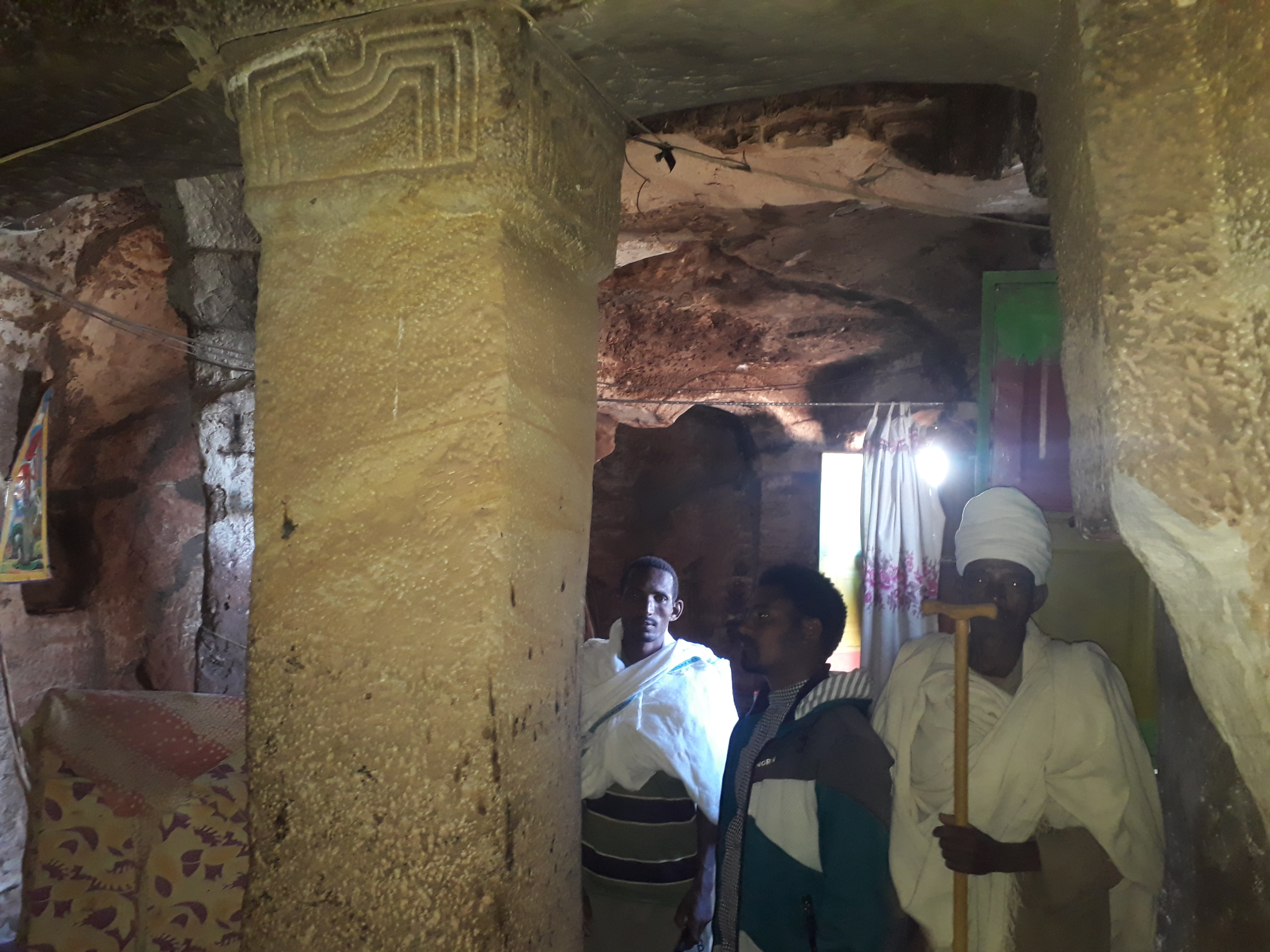
Inside Debre Sema'it village rock church

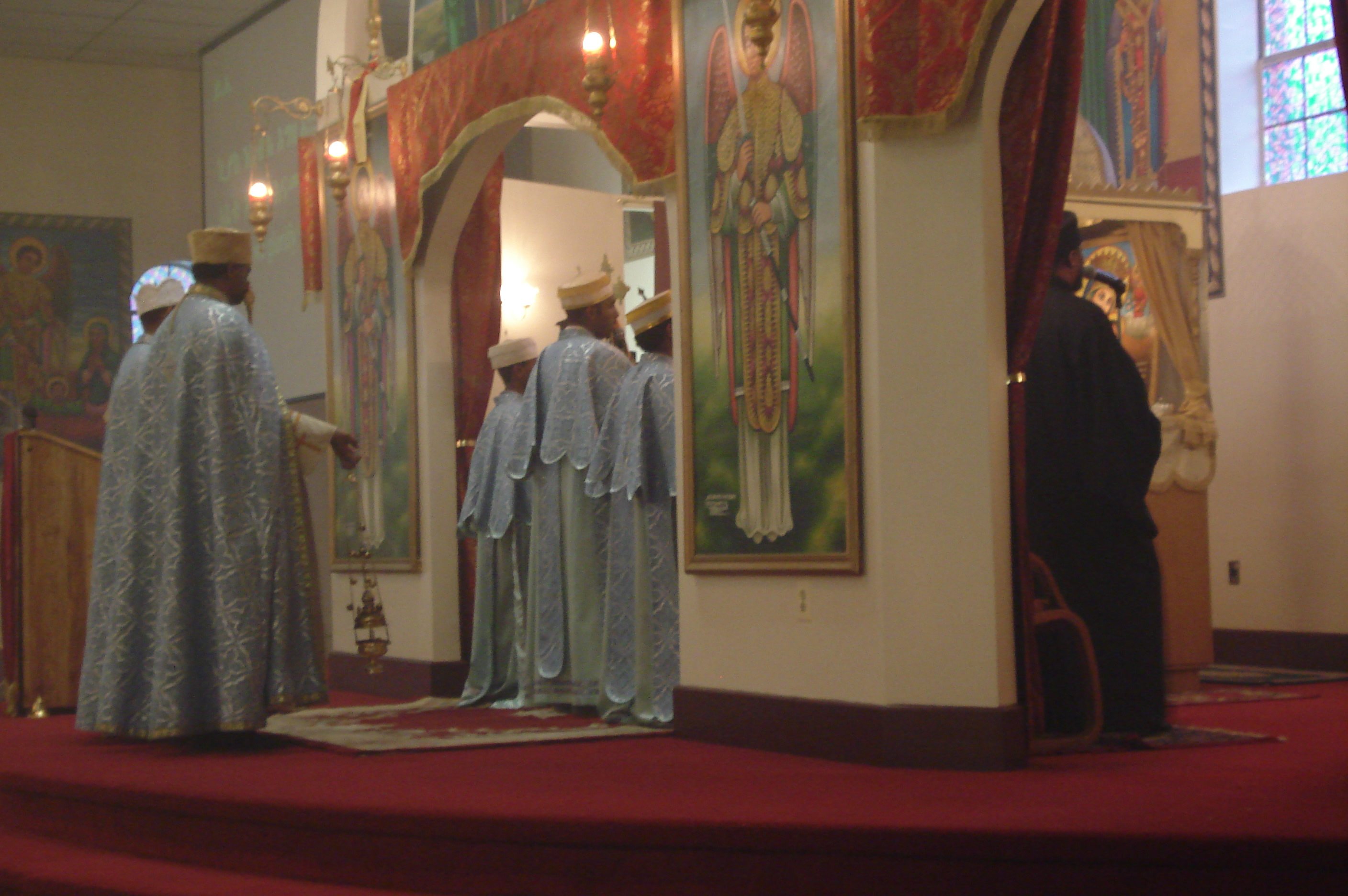
Priests and deacons conducting a church liturgy service at Debre Meheret Kidus Michael Ethiopian Orthodox Cathedral, Washington, D.C., U.S.

The faith and practice of Orthodox Ethiopian Christians include elements from miaphysite Christianity as it has developed in Ethiopia over the centuries. Christian beliefs include belief in God (in Geʽez / Amharic እግዚአብሔር ′Əgziäbəḥer, lit. "Lord of the Universe"), veneration of the Virgin Mary, the angels, and the saints, besides others. According to the Ethiopian Orthodox Church itself, there are no non-Christian elements in the religion other than those from the Old Testament, or Ḥəggä Orit (ሕገ ኦሪት), to which are added those from the New Testament, or Ḥəggä Wängel (ሕገ ወንጌል). A hierarchy of Qədusan ቅዱሳን (angelic messengers and saints) conveys the prayers of the faithful to God and carries out the divine will, so when Ethiopian Christians are in difficulty, they appeal to them as well as to God. In more formal and regular rituals, priests communicate on behalf of the community, and only priests may enter the inner sanctum of the usually circular or octagonal church where the tabot ("ark") dedicated to the church's patron saint is housed. On important religious holidays, the tabot is carried on the head of a priest and escorted in procession outside the church. It is the tabot, not the church, which is consecrated. At many services, most parish members remain in the outer ring, where debteras sing hymns and dance.

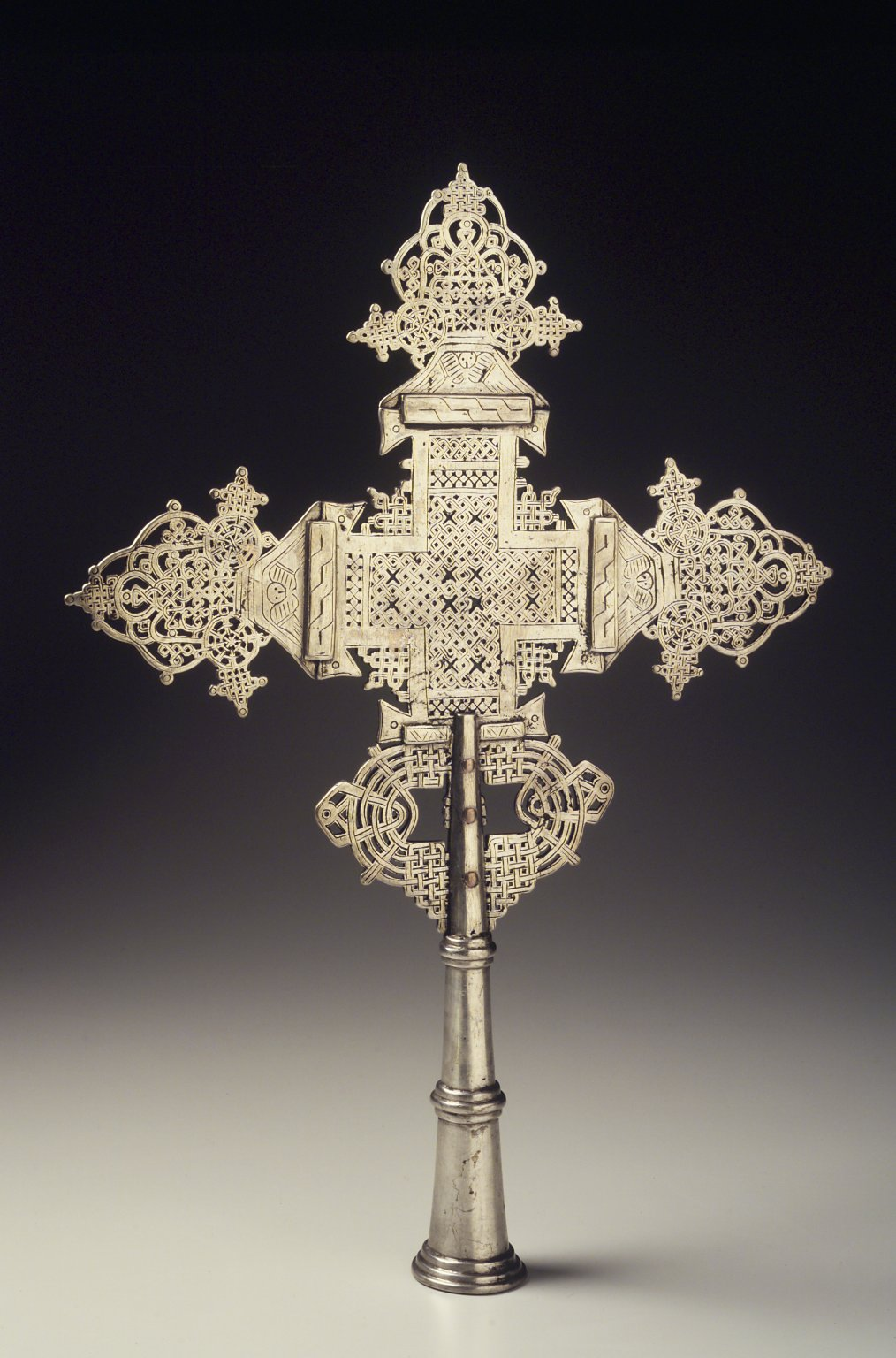
Mid-20th century processional cross from the Amhara Region, typically carried on long poles in Ethiopian Orthodox religious processions

The Eucharist is given only to those who feel pure, have fasted regularly, and have, in general, properly conducted themselves. Worshipers receiving communion may enter the middle ring of the church to do so.

The Ethiopian Orthodox church is Trinitarian, maintaining the Orthodox teaching, formalised at the council of Nicea, that God is united in three persons: Father, Son, and Holy Spirit. This concept is known as śəllase (ሥላሴ), Geʽez for "Trinity".

Daily services constitute only a small part of an Ethiopian Orthodox Christian's religious observance. Several holy days require prolonged services, singing and dancing, and feasting.

=== Fast days ===
An important religious requirement, however, is the keeping of fast days, during which adherents abstain from consuming meat and animal products, and refrain from sexual activity. The Ethiopian Orthodox Church has 250 fasting days, 180 of which are obligatory for lay people, not just monks and priests, when vegan food is eaten by the faithful. During the 40-day Advent fast, only one vegan meal is allowed per day.

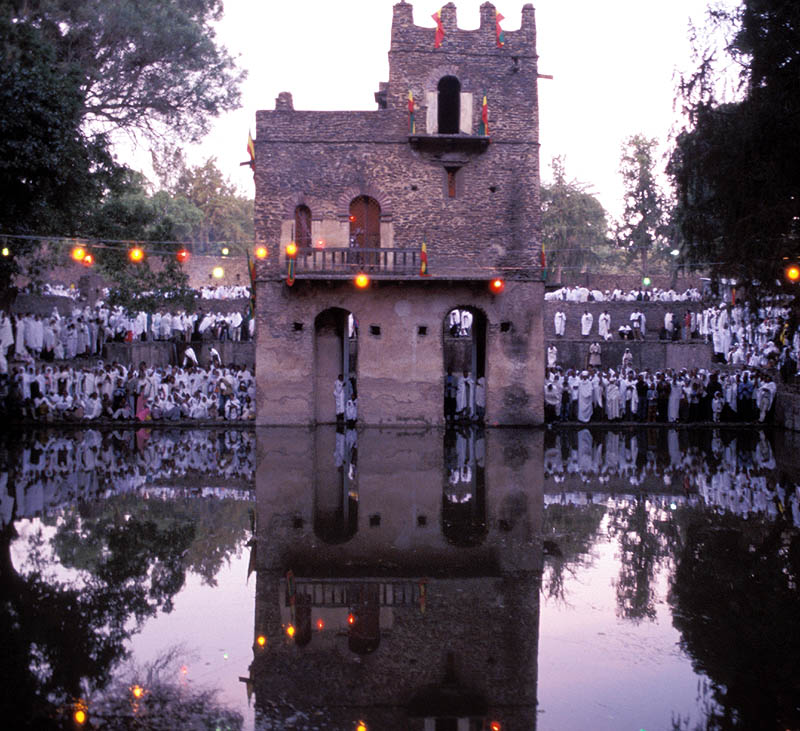
An Ethiopian Orthodox ceremony at Fasilides' Bath in Gondar, Ethiopia, celebrating Timkat (Epiphany)

1. ˁAbiy-Ṣomə or Hudade [ዓብይ ጾም or ሁዳዴ] (Great Lent) – 55 days prior to Easter (Fasika). This fast is divided into three separate periods: Ṣomə Hərqal (ጾመ ህርቃል), eight days commemorating Heraclius; Ṣomə 'Ärba (ጾመ አርባ), forty days of Lent; and Ṣomə Ḥəmamat (ጾመ ሕማማት), seven days commemorating Holy Week.
2. Fast of the Apostles – 10–40 days, which the Apostles kept after they had received the Holy Spirit. It begins after Pentecost.
3. Ṣomə Dihnät (ጾመ ድህነት) – which is on Wednesdays in commemoration of the plot organized to kill Jesus Christ by Caiaphas and the members of the house of the high priest and Fridays in commemoration of the Crucifixion of Jesus Christ (starts on Wednesday after Pentecost and spans up to Easter, in other words all Wednesdays and Fridays except during 50 days after Easter).
4. The fast of Dormition of Mother of God – it is observed for 16 days.
5. The fast of the prophets – The fast preceding Christmas, 40 days (Advent). It begins with Sibket on 15th Hedar and ends on Christmas Eve with the feast of Gena and the 29th of Tahsas and 28th if the year is preceded by leap year.
6. The Fast of Nineveh – commemorating the preaching of Jonah. It comes on Monday, Tuesday and Wednesday of the third week before Lent.
7. Gahad Fast-Timkat (Epiphany) – fast on the eve of Epiphany.

In addition to standard holy days, most Christians observe many saints' days. A man might give a small feast on his personal saint's day. The local voluntary association (called the maheber) connected with each church honours its patron saint with a special service and a feast two or three times a year.

=== Exorcism ===
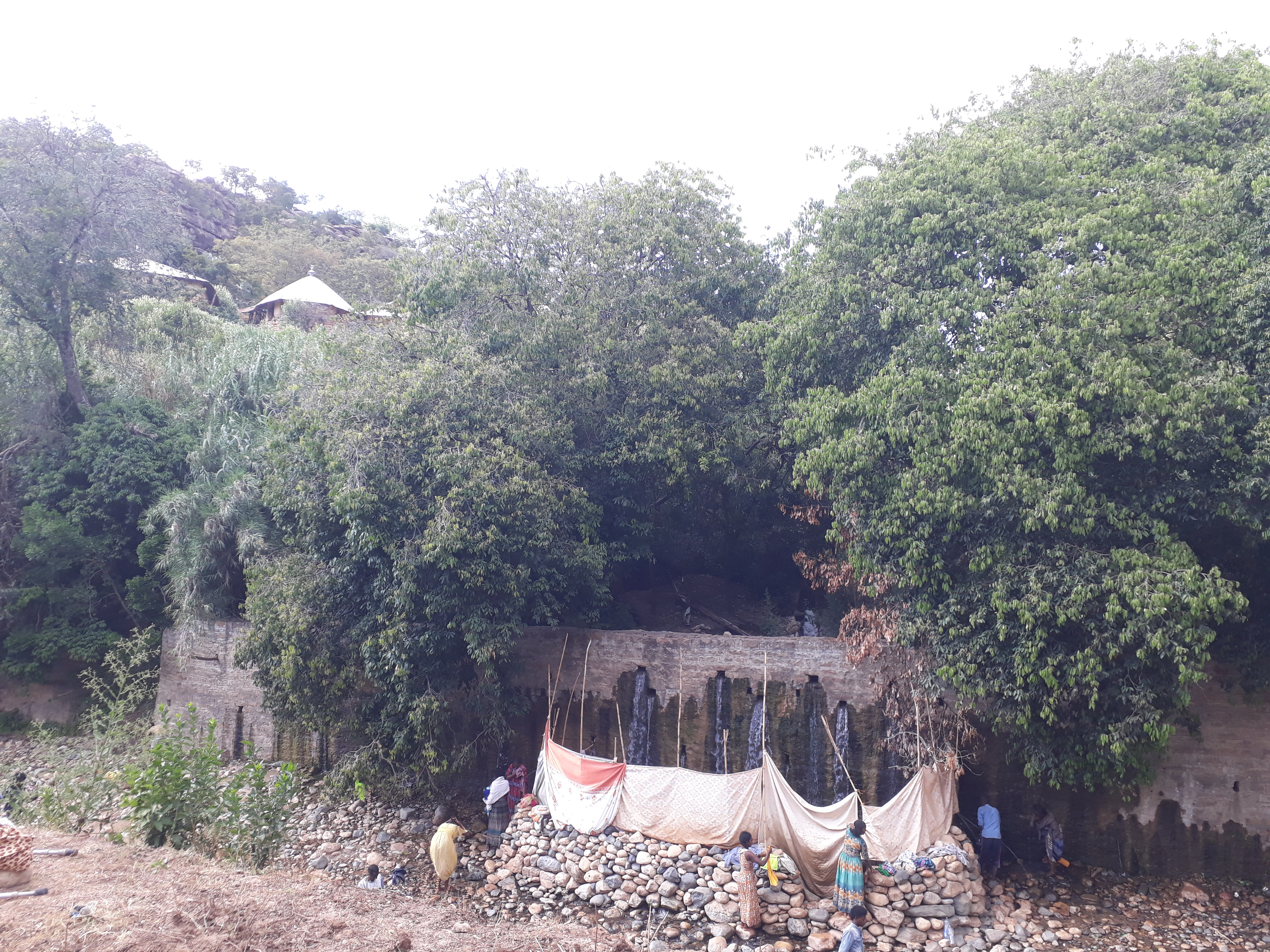
Inda Abba Hadera holy water in Inda Sillasie

Priests intervene and perform exorcisms on behalf of those believed to be afflicted by demons or buda. According to a 2010 Pew Research Center study, 74% of Christians in Ethiopia report having experienced or witnessed an exorcism. Demon-possessed persons are brought to a church or prayer meeting. Often, when an ill person has not responded to modern medical treatment, the affliction is attributed to demons. Unusual or especially perverse deeds, particularly when performed in public, are symptomatic of a demoniac. Superhuman strength—such as breaking one's bindings, as described in the New Testament accounts—along with glossolalia are observed in the afflicted. Amsalu Geleta, in a modern case study, relates elements that are common to Ethiopian Christian exorcisms:

It includes singing praise and victory songs, reading from the Scripture, prayer and confronting the spirit in the name of Jesus. Dialogue with the spirit is another important part of the exorcism ceremony. It helps the counsellor (exorcist) to know how the spirit was operating in the life of the demoniac. The signs and events mentioned by the spirit are affirmed by the victim after deliverance.

The exorcism is not always successful, and Geleta notes another instance in which the usual methods were unsuccessful, and the demons apparently left the subject at a later time. In any event, "in all cases the spirit is commanded in no other name than the name of Jesus."

=== Biblical canon ===
Old Testament:

1. Genesis
2. Exodus
3. Leviticus
4. Numbers
5. Deuteronomy
6. Joshua
7. Judges
8. Ruth
9. 1st & 2nd Samuel
10. 1st & 2nd Kings
11. 1st Chronicles
12. 2nd Chronicles (incl. Prayer of Manasseh)
13. Jubilees
14. Enoch
15. 1st & 2nd Esdras
16. 3rd Esdras & Ezra Sutuel
17. Tobit
18. Judith
19. Esther (with additions)
20. 1st Meqabyan (Maccabees)
21. 2nd & 3rd Meqabyan
22. Josippon
23. Job
24. Psalms (incl. Psalm 151)
25. Proverbs
26. Reproof
27. Ecclesiastes
28. Song of Solomon
29. Wisdom of Solomon
30. Sirach
31. Isaiah
32. Jeremiah (incl. Lamentations, 1st Baruch, Letter of Jeremiah, & 4th Baruch)
33. Ezekiel
34. Daniel (with additions, incl. Susanna & Bel and the Dragon)
35. Hosea
36. Joel
37. Amos
38. Obadiah
39. Jonah
40. Micah
41. Nahum
42. Habakkuk
43. Zephaniah
44. Haggai
45. Zechariah
46. Malachi

New Testament:

1. Matthew
2. Mark
3. Luke
4. John
5. Acts
6. Romans
7. 1st Corinthians
8. 2nd Corinthians
9. Galatians
10. Ephesians
11. Philippians
12. Colossians
13. 1st Thessalonians
14. 2nd Thessalonians
15. 1st Timothy
16. 2nd Timothy
17. Titus
18. Philemon
19. Hebrews
20. James
21. 1st Peter
22. 2nd Peter
23. 1st John
24. 2nd John
25. 3rd John
26. Jude
27. Revelation
28. 1st Sinodos
29. 2nd Sinodos
30. 3rd Sinodos
31. 4th Sinodos
32. 1st Covenant
33. 2nd Covenant
34. Ethiopic Clement
35. Didascalia

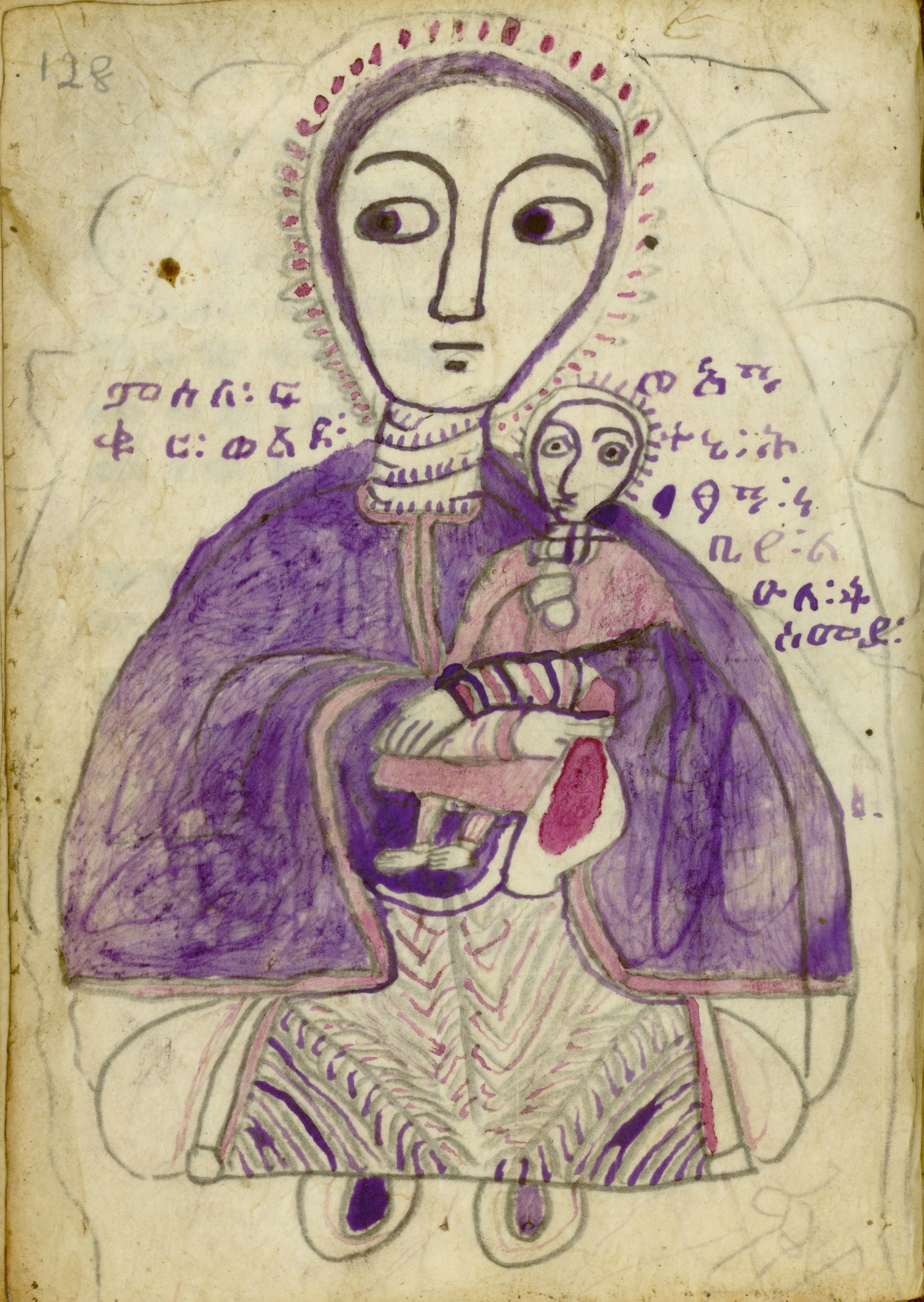
Drawing of the Virgin Mary 'with her beloved son' in pencil and ink, from a manuscript copy of Weddasé Māryām, c. 1875

=== Language ===
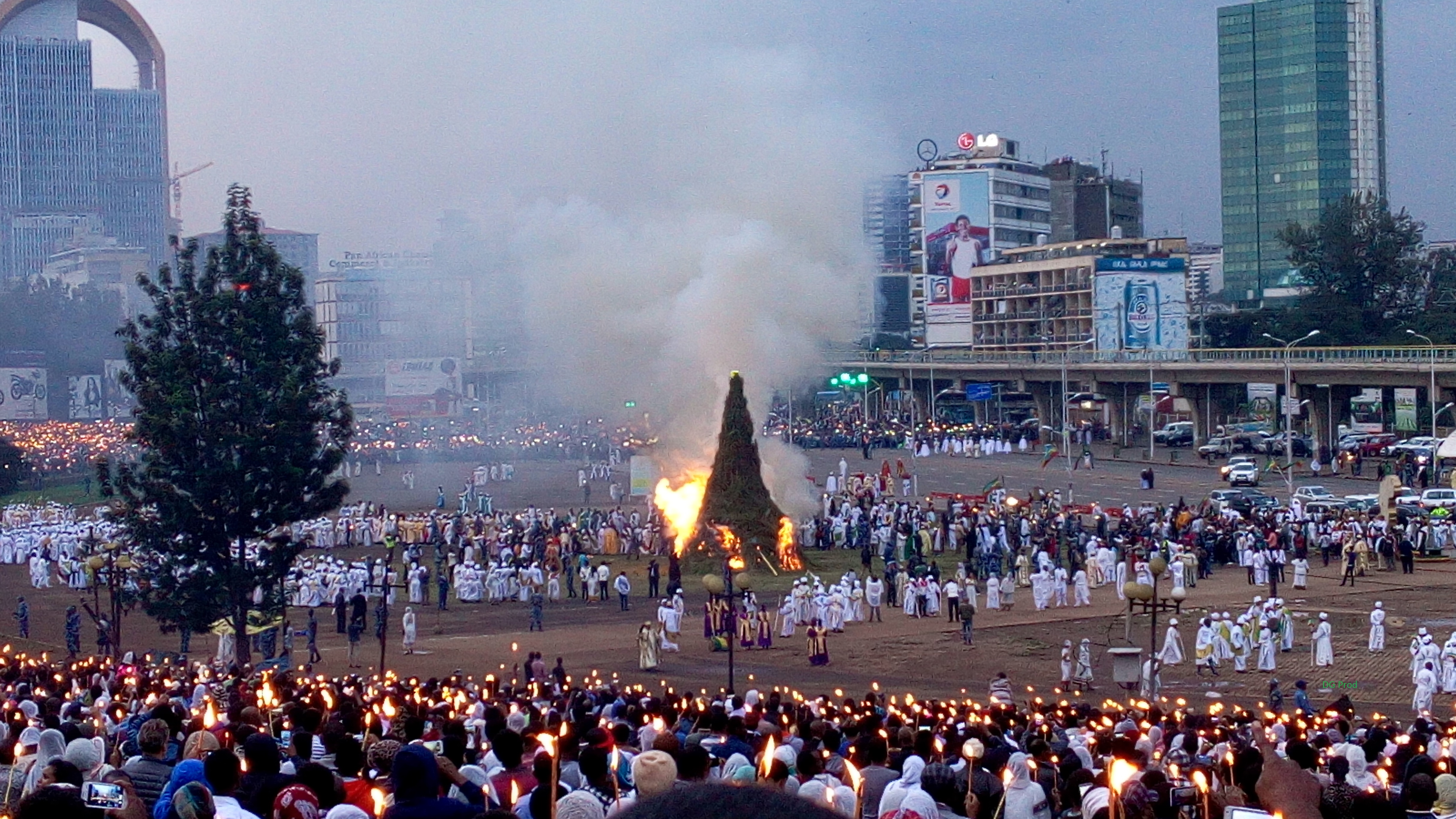
Ethiopian Orthodox celebration of Meskel (Geʽez for "cross")

The divine services of the Ethiopian Church are celebrated in Geʽez, which has been the liturgical language of the church at least since the arrival of the Nine Saints (Pantelewon, Gerima (Isaac, or Yeshaq), Aftse, Guba, Alef, Yem’ata, Liqanos, and Sehma), who are believed to have fled persecution by the Byzantine Empire after the Council of Chalcedon (451). The Greek Septuagint was the version of the Old Testament originally translated into Ge'ez, but later revisions show clear evidence of the use of Hebrew, Syriac and Arabic sources. The first translation into a modern vernacular was done in the 19th century by a man usually known as Abu Rumi (died 1819). Later, Haile Selassie sponsored Amharic translations of the Ge'ez Scriptures during his reign (1930–1974): one in 1935 before World War II and one afterwards (1960–1961). Sermons today are usually delivered in the local language.

=== Architecture ===
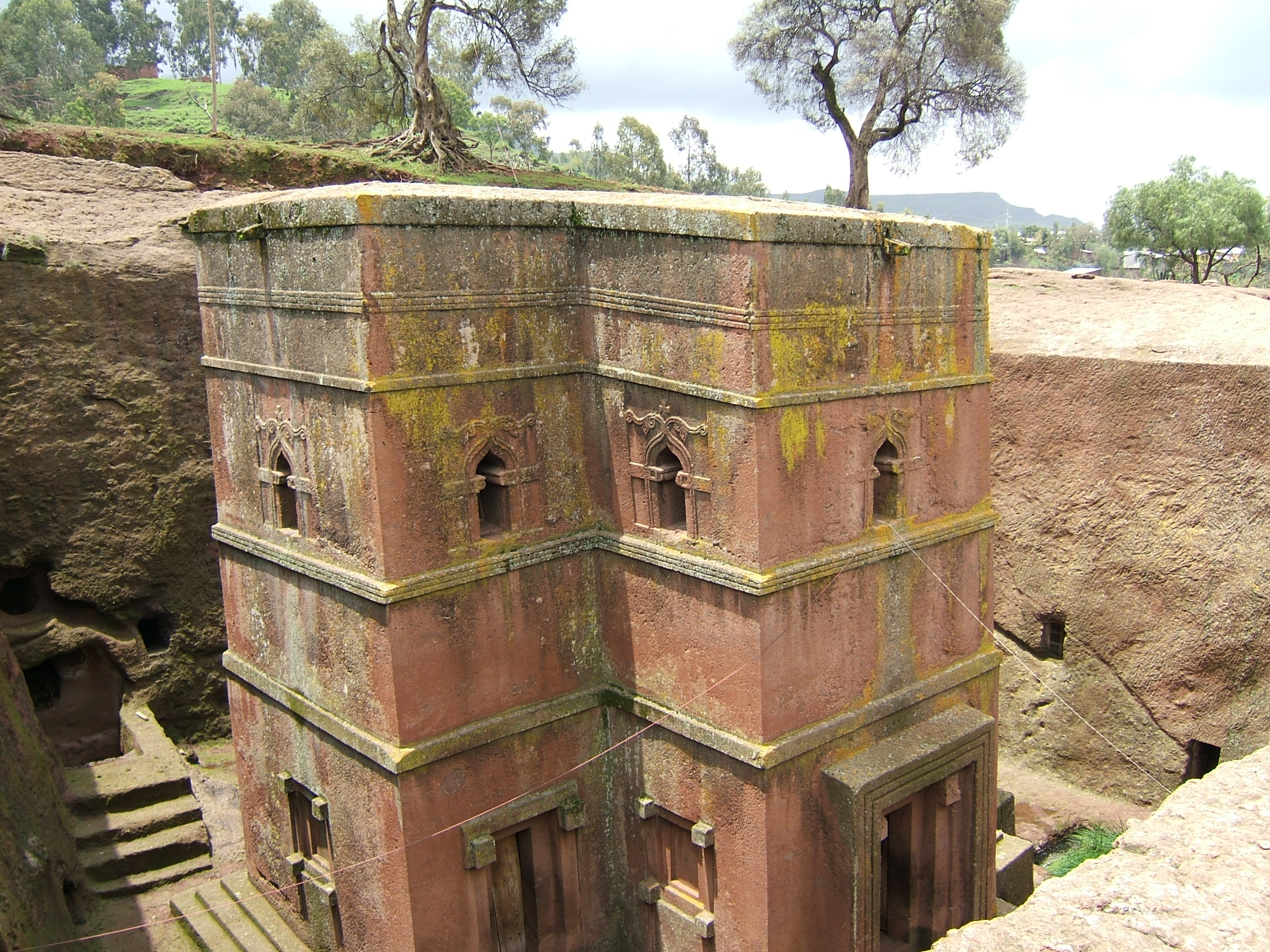
The Church of Saint George, a monolithic church in Lalibela

There are many monolithic (rock-hewn) churches in Ethiopia, most famously eleven churches at Lalibela. Besides these, two main types of architecture are found—one basilican, the other native. The Church of Our Lady Mary of Zion at Axum is an example of the basilican design, though the early basilicas are nearly all in ruin. These examples show the influence of the architects who, in the 6th century, built the basilicas at Sanʻāʼ and elsewhere in the Arabian Peninsula. There are two forms of native churches: one oblong, traditionally found in Tigray; the other circular, traditionally found in Amhara and Shewa (though either style may be found elsewhere). In both forms, the sanctuary is square and stands clear in the centre, and the arrangements are based on Jewish tradition. Walls and ceilings are adorned with frescoes. A courtyard, circular or rectangular, surrounds the body of the church. Modern Ethiopian churches may incorporate the basilican or native styles and use contemporary construction techniques and materials. In rural areas, the church and outer court are often thatched, with mud-built walls. The church buildings are typically surrounded by a forested area, acting as a reservoir of biodiversity in otherwise de-forested parts of the country.

=== Ark of the Covenant ===
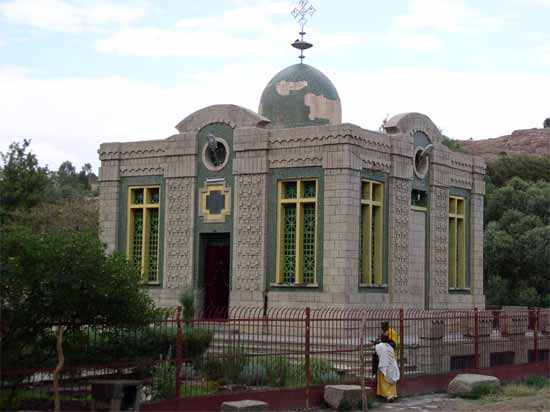
The Chapel of the Tablet at the Church of Our Lady Mary of Zion is said to house the original Ark of the Covenant.

The Ethiopian Church claims that one of its churches, Our Lady Mary of Zion, is host to the original Ark of the Covenant that Moses carried with the Israelites during the Exodus. Only one priest is allowed into the building where the Ark is located, ostensibly due to biblical warnings of danger. As a result, international scholars doubt that the original Ark is truly there.

Throughout Ethiopia, Orthodox churches are not considered churches until the local bishop gives them a tabot, a replica of the original Ark of the Covenant. The tabot is at least six inches (15 cm) square, and it is made of either alabaster, marble, or wood (see acacia). It is always kept in ornate coverings on the altar. Only priests are allowed to see or touch the tabot. In an elaborate procession, the tabot is carried around the outside of the church amid joyful song on the feast day of that particular church's namesake. On the great Feast of Timkat (Amharic: ጥምቀት T’əmqät), known as Epiphany or Theophany in Europe, a group of churches send their tabot to celebrate the occasion at a common location where a pool of water or a river is to be found.

=== Similarities to Judaism and Islam ===
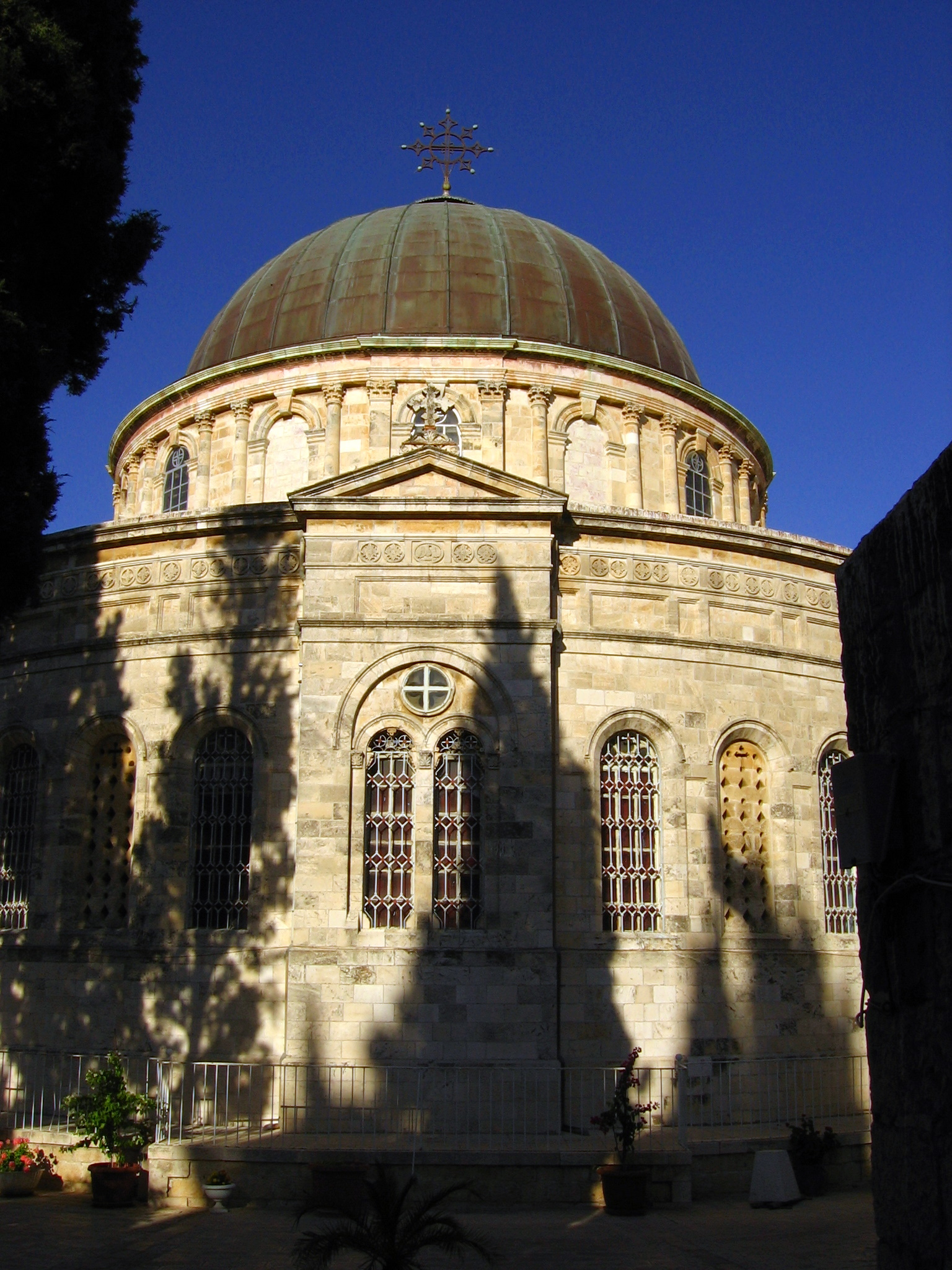
The Ethiopian Church, Jerusalem

The Ethiopian Church places a heavier emphasis on Old Testament teachings than one might find in other churches. Women are prohibited from entering the church temple during menstruation; they are also expected to cover their hair with a large scarf (or shash) while in church, as described in 1 Corinthians, chapter 11. As with Orthodox synagogues, men and women sit separately in the Ethiopian church, with men on the left and women on the right (when facing the altar). Mandated hair coverings for women and separation of the sexes in churches is uncommon in other Christian traditions; but this is the case in some sects of Islam and Judaism.

Before praying, the Ethiopian Orthodox remove their shoes in order to acknowledge that one is offering prayer before a holy God. Ethiopian Orthodox worshippers remove their shoes when entering a church temple, in accordance with Exodus 3:5 (in which Moses, while viewing the burning bush, was commanded to remove his shoes while standing on holy ground). Furthermore, the Ethiopian Orthodox Tewahedo Church is known to observe the seventh-day Sabbath (Saturday, or the lesser Sabbath), in addition to the Lord's Day (Sunday, or the Christian Sabbath), recognizing both to be holy days of joy, prayer, and contemplation, although more emphasis, because of the Resurrection of Christ, is laid upon Sunday. While the Ethiopian Church is known for this practice, it is neither an innovation nor unique to it, deriving from the Apostolic Constitutions and the Apostolic Canons the former of which without the Apostolic Canons included is in the church's 81-book canon as the Didascalia. The nature of the Sabbath became a doctrinal dispute in the Coptic Orthodox Church of Alexandria only in the centuries leading up to the issue being rectified by Ewostatewos. The emperor Gelawdewos in his Confession, an apologia of traditional beliefs and practices says "we do not honour it as the Jews do... but we so honour it that we celebrate thereon the Eucharist and have love-feasts, even as our Fathers the Apostles have taught us in the Didascalia".

It is a common cultural practice for members of the Ethiopian Orthodox Tewahedo Church to undergo male circumcision and to abstain from meats deemed unclean. This is purely done as a cultural tradition and not out of religious obligation, the liturgy explicitly stating "let us not be circumcised like the Jews. We know that He who had to fulfil the law and the prophets has already come."

The Ethiopian Orthodox Church prescribes several kinds of hand washing and traditionally follow rituals that are similar to Jewish netilat yadayim, for example after leaving the latrine, lavatory or bathhouse, or before prayer, or after eating a meal. The Ethiopian Orthodox Church observes days of ritual purification. People who are ritually unclean may approach the church but are not permitted to enter it; they instead stand near the church door and pray during the liturgy.

Rugare Rukuni and Erna Oliver identify the Nine Saints as Jewish Christians, and attribute the Judaic character of Ethiopian Christianity, in part, to their influence.

=== Debtera ===
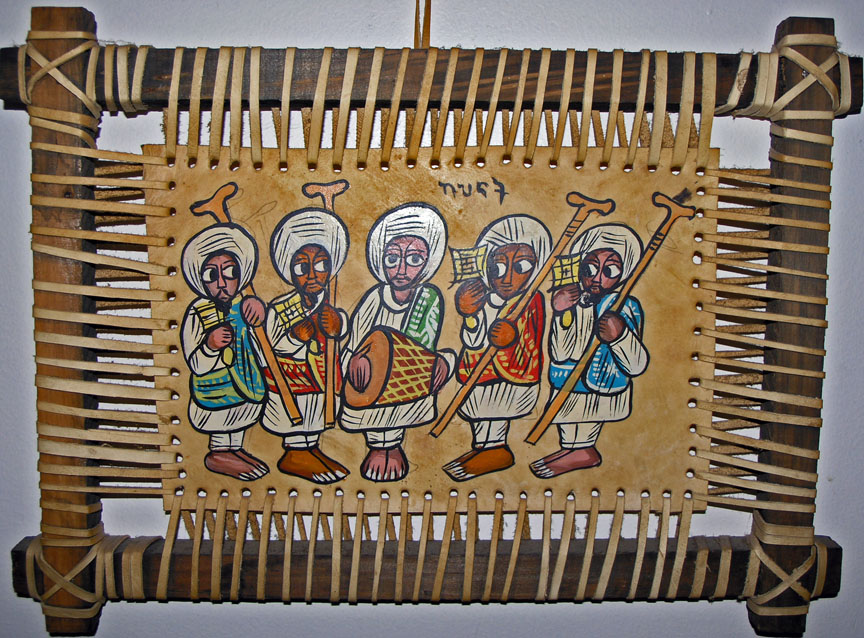
A painting of performing debteras

A debtera is an itinerant lay man trained by the Ethiopian Church to function principally as a scribe or cantor, equivalent to minor orders. These men may act as deacons or exorcists, and the role of folk healer is commonly undertaken as well. Folklore and legends ascribe the role of magician to the debtera as well.

=== Music ===
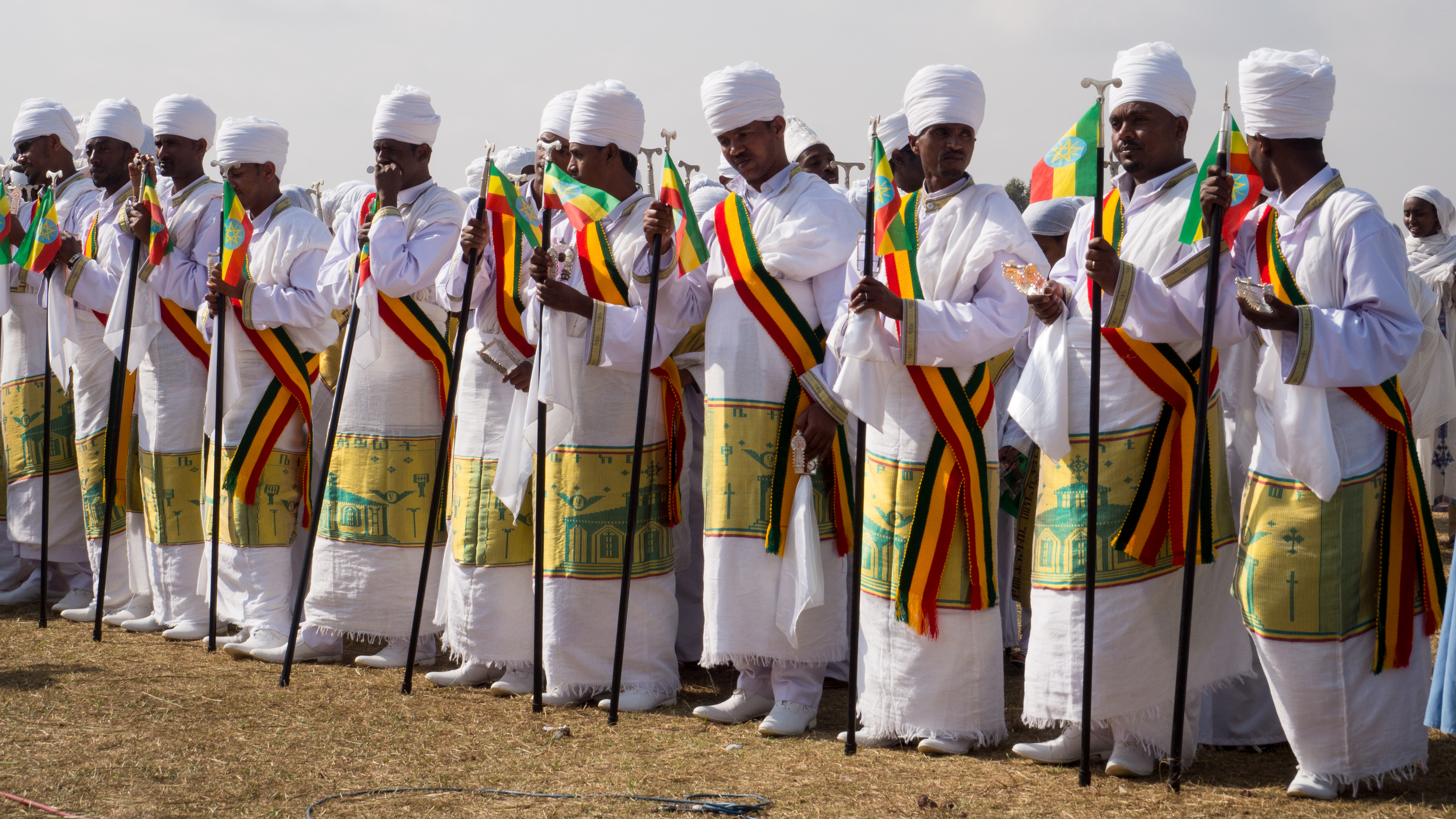
Ethiopian Orthodox debtrawoch dancing during 2015 Timkat celebration

The music of Ethiopian Orthodox Church traces back to Saint Yared, who composed zema ("chanting"), which is divided into three modes: Geʽez (ordinary days), Ezel (fast days and Lent), and Araray (principal feasts). It is important to Ethiopian liturgy and divided into fourteen Anaphoras, the normal use being of the Twelve Apostles. In ancient times, there were six Anaphoras used by many monasteries.

== Patriarch-catholicoi, archbishops and bishops ==
Patriarch-Catholicos

Since 1959, when the church was granted autocephaly by Cyril VI, Pope of the Coptic Orthodox Church of Alexandria, an Ethiopian Patriarch-Catholicos of Eritrea also carrying the title of abuna is the head of the Ethiopian Orthodox Tewahedo Church. The abuna is officially known as Patriarch and Catholicos of Ethiopia, Archbishop of Axum and Ichege of the See of Saint Taklahaimanot. The incumbent head of the Ethiopian Orthodox Tewahedo Church is Mathias who acceded to this position on 27 February 2013.

Archbishops and bishops

Ethiopia

- Mathias, Patriarch and Head of all Archbishops of the Ethiopian Orthodox Tewahedo Church.
- Zekarias, Archbishop Of West Gojjam Zone.
- Gorgorios, Archbishop Of East Shewa.
- Athnatios, Archbishop of South Wollo and Kemise.
- Kerlos, Archbishop of North Wollo.
- Kewestos, Archbishop of North Shewa (Oromia).
- Merha-Kirstos, Archbishop Of Adigrat.
- Yonas, Former Archbishop of Afar.
- Endrias, Archbishop-Head of Ethiopian Orthodox Tewahedo Church Scholars Council.
- Estifanos, Archbishop of North Gondar, Jima and Yem Zone.
- Yoseph, Archbishop of Bale.
- Samuel, Archbishop of Ethiopian Orthodox Tewahedo Church Development and Inter-Church Aid Commission.
- Ezekiel, Archbishop of Kefa, Sheka and Bench Maji, Head of St Paul Theological College.
- Dioskoros, Archbishop Of Raya.
- Lukas, Archbishop of Setit Humera.
- Abraham, Archbishop of Bahir Dar City and North gojam.
- Yared, Archbishop of East Arsi.
- Henok, Archbishop of the South and West Africa.
- Embakom, Archbishop of the Head of Monasteries.
- Kelementos, Archbishop of North Shewa.
- Mathewos, Archbishop of Egypt, North Africa and East Africa.
- Sawiros, Archbishop of South West Shewa and Sheger.
- Ewstatios, Archbishop of ilu Aba Bora.
- Markos, Archbishop Of Apostolic Service and Evangelical Department.
- Entos, Archbishop Of West Harerge.
- Yohannes, Archbishop of North Gondar.
- Selama, Archbishop of West Gondar.
- Yishak, Archbishop Of Wolayta.
- Zena-markos, Archbishop Of West Arsi, Liden, Guji and Borana.
- Thomas, Archbishop Of Awi Zone and Metekel.
- Melketsedek, Archbishop Of Gurage.
- Ermias, Archbishop Of North Wollo.
- Rufael, Archbishop Of Gambela, West Wollega, East Wollega, Horo Guduru Wollega, South Sudan and Assosa.
- Gerima, Bishop of Gedio Amaro and Burji.
- Gabriel, Bishop of West Shewa.
- Timoteos, Bishop Of Dawro konta.
- Elsa, Bishop Of Somali.
- Bertelomios, Bishop of Dire Dawa.
- Ephrem, Bishop Of Buno Bedele.
- Epifanios, Bishop Of East Gurage.
- Nikodimos, Bishop of East Harerge.

Canada

- Demetrios, archbishop of Eastern Canada.
  - Mekarios, Archbishop of West Canada.

Middle East

- Dimetros, Archbishop of Middle East, United Arab Emirates and Lebanon.
- Nathaniel, Archbishop Of Jerusalem.

South America

- Thaddaeus, Archbishop Of The Caribbean And Latin America.

United States

- Fanuel, Archbishop of Washington, D.C., and its surrounding.
- Petros, Archbishop of New York and its surrounding.
- Philipos, archbishop of Pennsylvania and Head of Eyesus Church in Baltimore
- Yaekob, archbishop of Georgia and its surrounding areas
- Nathaniel, Archbishop of Minnesota and Colorado.
- Selama, archbishop of Ohio
- Sawiros, archbishop of Texas
- Theoplos, Archbishop of North California.
- Barnabas, Archbishop of South California.

Europe

- Elias, Archbishop of Nordic and Scandinavia, Greece.
- Yakob, Archbishop of United Kingdom, Ireland and Far East Countries.
- Heryakos, Archbishop of Italy and its surrounding.
- Diyonaseyos, Archbishop Of Germany and its Surrounding.

Australia & New Zealand

- Muse, Archbishop Of Australia.

== Eparchies ==
The current eparchies of the church include:

In Ethiopia

- Addis Ababa
- Hawassa
- Axum
- West Shewa Zone (Ambo)
- West Arsi Zone
- Assosa
- Afar
- Bale
- Wollega
- North Wollo
- South Wollo (Dessie)
- Gambela
- West Gojjam (Bahir Dar)
- East Gojjam (Debre Markos)
- North Gondar
- South Gondar (Debre Tabor)
- Illubabor
- Jimma
- Kembata
- Negele-Borena
- Somali Region
- East Tigray
- West Tigray
- Central Tigray (Me'kele)
- South Tigray
- East Shewa Zone (Adama)
- Keffa
- Shewa
- West Hararghe Zone
- Wolaita
- Agew Awi Zone
- Dire Dawa
- East Hararghe Zone
- North Shewa Zone (Amhara) (Debre Berhan)
- North Shewa Zone (Oromia) (Selale)
- Metekel Zone
- Gurage Zone
- Gedeo Zone
- East Gurage Zone
- Dawro Zone

Outside of Ethiopia

- United States:
  - Atlanta, Georgia, and its surroundings
  - California
  - New York
  - Ohio
  - Pennsylvania
  - Texas
  - Washington, D.C., and its surroundings
- Australia
- Caribbean and Latin America
- Canada
- Far East countries
- Germany and its surroundings
- Jerusalem
- Middle East, United Arab Emirates and Lebanon
- Nordic countries, Scandinavia and Greece
- United Kingdom and Ireland

== See also ==
- Abuna
- Biblical law in Christianity
- Christianity and Judaism
- Christian observances of Jewish holidays
- Christianity in Ethiopia
- Eritrean Orthodox Tewahedo Church
- Ethiopian Catholic Church
- Ethiopian chant
- Ethiopian Orthodox Church in Exile
- List of abunas of Ethiopia
- List of calendar of saints in the Orthodox Tewahedo
- Oriental Orthodox Churches
- Mahibere Kidusan

== Bibliography ==
- Brock, Sebastian P. (2016). "Miaphysite, not Monophysite!". Cristianesimo Nella Storia. 37 (1): 45–52. ISBN 9788815261687.
- Grillmeier, Aloys; Hainthaler, Theresia (1996). Christ in Christian Tradition: The Church of Alexandria with Nubia and Ethiopia after 451. Vol. 2/4. Louisville: Westminster John Knox Press. ISBN 9780664223007.
- Meyendorff, John (1966). Orthodoxy and Catholicity. New York: Sheed & Ward.
- Meyendorff, John (1989). Imperial unity and Christian divisions: The Church 450-680 A.D. Crestwood, NY: St Vladimir's Seminary Press. ISBN 9780881410563.
- Mikre-Sellassie Gebre-Amanuel. 1993. "The Bible and its canon in the Ethiopian Orthodox Church." The Bible Translator 44/1:111-123.
- Winkler, Dietmar W. (1997). "Miaphysitism: A New Term for Use in the History of Dogma and in Ecumenical Theology". The Harp. 10 (3): 33–40.
- Yesehaq, Abuna (1997). The Ethiopian Tewahedo Church: An Integrally African Church. Winston-Derek Publishers.
