= Abuna Takla Haymanot =

Patriarch of the Ethiopian Orthodox Tewahedo Church from 1976 to 1988

His Holiness Abune Takla Haymanot
- Patriarch and Catholicos of Ethiopia
- Church: Ethiopian Orthodox Tewahedo Church
- Installed: 29 August 1976
- Term ended: 5 June 1988
- Predecessor: Abuna Theophilos
- Successor: Abune Merkorios

Orders
- Ordination: 1934 (Priesthood)
- Consecration: 18 July 1976

Personal details
- Born: Melaku Wolde-Mikael; 21 September 1917 Mahdere Mariam, Begemder Province, Ethiopia (now Farta, South Gondar, Ethiopian Empire)
- Died: 29 August 1988 (aged 70) Addis Ababa, People's Democratic Republic of Ethiopia
- Buried: Holy Trinity Cathedral, Addis Ababa

Abuna Takla Haymanot (Ge'ez: አቡነ ተክለ ሃይማኖት, born Melaku Wolde-Mikael: 21 September 1917 – 29 August 1988) was the third Patriarch of the Ethiopian Orthodox Tewahedo Church from 1976 to 1988.

After political turmoil of the Ethiopian Revolution, the Derg arrested Abuna Theophilos in May 1976 to consecrate Melaku. The government proceeded to hold church assembly to elect the bahtawi (hermit) Melaku that has little education around the subject. On 7 July 1976, The Assembly of the Church held under the leadership of the Locum Tenens (Acting Patriarch) Archbishop Abune Yohannes that elevated Melaku to Patriarch on 18 July, and ultimately enthroned on 29 August.

== Early life ==
Abune Takla Haymanot was born in 1918, the son of a simple soldier, Wolde Mikael Adamu in southern Begemder province. As a young boy, he left home to study at the Zerzer St. Michael Church School in Bitchena, Gojjam Province where he studied advanced Bible commentary and "Kine" (ecclesiastic poetry). He was ordained a deacon by the then Coptic Archbishop of the Ethiopian Orthodox Church, Abune Mattewos. In 1934, just before the Italian occupation, he traveled to Addis Ababa and was ordained a priest by Abune Kerlos, the last Coptic Archbishop of Ethiopia. He then went on to Sodo town, then a very small village in Wolaitta district of Sidamo Province to serve at the Debre Menkirat St. Takla Haymanot Monastery. Abba Melaku Wolde Mikael is believed to have had a transformative religious revelation during his service there, and he became a "bahitawi" or hermit monk. Although he played a significant role in preaching to the people of the district and helping to found and build schools, orphanages and churches, he spent the majority of his time sequestered alone in a cave praying and mortifying his flesh by severe penance and self-denial. He ate only the simplest foods (mostly boiled grains) and wore simple yellow robes of the lowest quality.

== Elevation to the Patriarchate ==
Abba Melaku was enthroned as Patriarch of Ethiopia following the forcible removal from the Patriarchal throne of the previous Patriarch, Abuna Theophilos (a.k.a. Abuna Tewophilos) by the Marxist Derg regime in May 1976. Following the Patriarch's arrest, the Derg ordered that an assembly of clergy and laity of the church along with the Holy Synod elect a new Patriarch to replace the arrested Abuna Tewophilos. All Archbishops were disqualified from being elected for having been too close to the recently deposed Ethiopian monarchy. The Assembly of the Church met on July 7, 1976, and under the leadership of the locum tenens (Acting Patriarch) Archbishop Abune Yohannes, was made to elect Abba Melaku as the new Patriarch of the Ethiopian Orthodox Church. The new Patriarch-elect of the Orthodox Church was elevated to the rank of bishop with the name Takla Haymanot on July 18, 1976, and then enthroned as Patriarch of Ethiopia on August 29. With little formal education, and little exposure to temporal affairs, Abba Melaku had spent the bulk of his life as a hermit praying in a cave, and preaching to the people of Wollaita district, helping to build numerous churches and church schools in the area. It is believed that the Derg hoped that such simple rural man would be easy to control. Indeed, Abune Takla Haymanot's reaction to the news that he was to be enthroned as Patriarch of the Church was extreme distress, and he was reduced to bitter weeping. He was enthroned, and within a year, he was made to appoint 14 new bishops to replace the old ones who were deemed to have been close to the government of Emperor Haile Selassie. A government appointed administrator was installed to place the church under the tutelage of the Derg.

The Coptic church refused to recognize the removal of Patriarch Abune Tewophilos, and declared that as far as the church of Egypt was concerned, he remained the canonical Patriarch of Ethiopia. Even after the execution of Patriarch Abune Tewophilos became widely known, the lack of an official announcement of his death kept the Coptic Church from recognizing any other person as head of the Ethiopian Orthodox Church. Although the two churches continued in communion with each other, formal ties were severed and the Coptic Patriarchate refused to recognize Abune Takla Haymanot as legitimate.

Abune Takla Haymanot presided over the church during a tumult filled period of Ethiopian history. The Derg launched a vicious and bloody campaign against its opponents known as the Ethiopian Red Terror. Countless of people from every political, social, economic and religious grouping, were imprisoned, tortured, or killed, and thousands fled the country as a hard line Communist and officially atheist regime imposed itself on the ancient empire. Later during his tenure, Ethiopia would fall victim to the worst famine in its recorded history when millions are believed to have been affected directly. During these hard times, church attendance exploded to all time highs, and unlike the other Communist countries of the world, actually grew during this period. Although his legitimacy had been called into question, Abune Takla Haymanot through his personal devoutness and dignity, would become the most popular of all the men to have sat on the Patriarchal throne in Ethiopia. Upon his enthronement, he had refused to don the black robes traditional to high-ranking hierarchs of the Orthodox churches. Instead he adopted robes that were bright yellow, the color of the bahitawi hermits, and a color which in Ethiopian tradition symbolized penance and suffering. Indeed, the Patriarch spent the entire 11 years of his reign in almost constant penance. He prayed constantly, refused to eat anything but the simplest boiled and roasted grains and beans, slept on the bare floor and wore the thinnest of sandals, in an act of constant self-mortification. Every penny of his personal allowance was spent on educating a group of famine orphans that he was personally raising in the Patriarchate itself. Although never directly confronting the communist government for fear of increasing the persecution of his flock, Patriarch Abune Takla Haymanot preached to his people to be strong and to pray, joining them in this endeavor with all his heart. Eventually, the Derg realized that instead of having a pliant, easily manipulated country bumpkin, they were dealing with a formidable, deeply conservative, rigid and uncompromising man at the head of the church. He increasingly refused to accept incursions on his office by the government appointed administrator, and eventually had the man removed from office.

There are reports, that there was a final rupture between President Mengistu Haile Mariam and the Patriarch following the napalm and cluster bombing of rebel held areas of Eritrea and the Tigray Region in the north in 1988. It is said that the Patriarch had protested against such measures being carried out on innocent civilian populations, and that Col. Mengistu had angrily demanded that he stop interfering in state affairs. The Patriarch, already in poor health and a weakened state thanks to his constant fasting and penance, then began an even more rigorous fast (basically a hunger strike in protest) and refused to make any more public appearances other than to attend the Divine Liturgy at the church within the Patriarchate. He made one final public appearance at the inauguration of a new church in Wollaita, and visited the cave where he had once lived. He returned to Addis Ababa and was almost immediately admitted to the hospital, where he died.

The Ethiopian government ordered a full state funeral for Patriarch Abune Takla Haymanot, complete with military escort, gun salutes and flags at half staff throughout Ethiopia. The open casket was carried from St. Mary's church in the Patriarchate, to Holy Trinity Cathedral, on the same carriage that was once used by the fallen Imperial regime for royal funerals. The Patriarch lay in his coffin wearing a Patriarchal crown and in his robes of office, draped with the Ethiopian flag. Tens of thousands of weeping faithful packed the streets to see the body pass on the way to the Cathedral. He was buried at the Cathedral after lying in state for three days. His burial was attended by the entire diplomatic corps in Addis Ababa as well as most of the high-ranking members of the government and the Workers' Party of Ethiopia (WPE).

Abune Takla Haymanot was succeeded by Patriarch Abuna Merkorios.

== See also ==
- List of abunas of Ethiopia

Oriental Orthodox titles
Preceded by Abuna Theophilos	Patriarch of the Ethiopian Orthodox Tewahedo Church; 1976–1988	Succeeded by Abuna Merkorios
