= List of abunas of Ethiopia =

Abuna of Ethiopia
- Bishopric

Oriental Orthodox
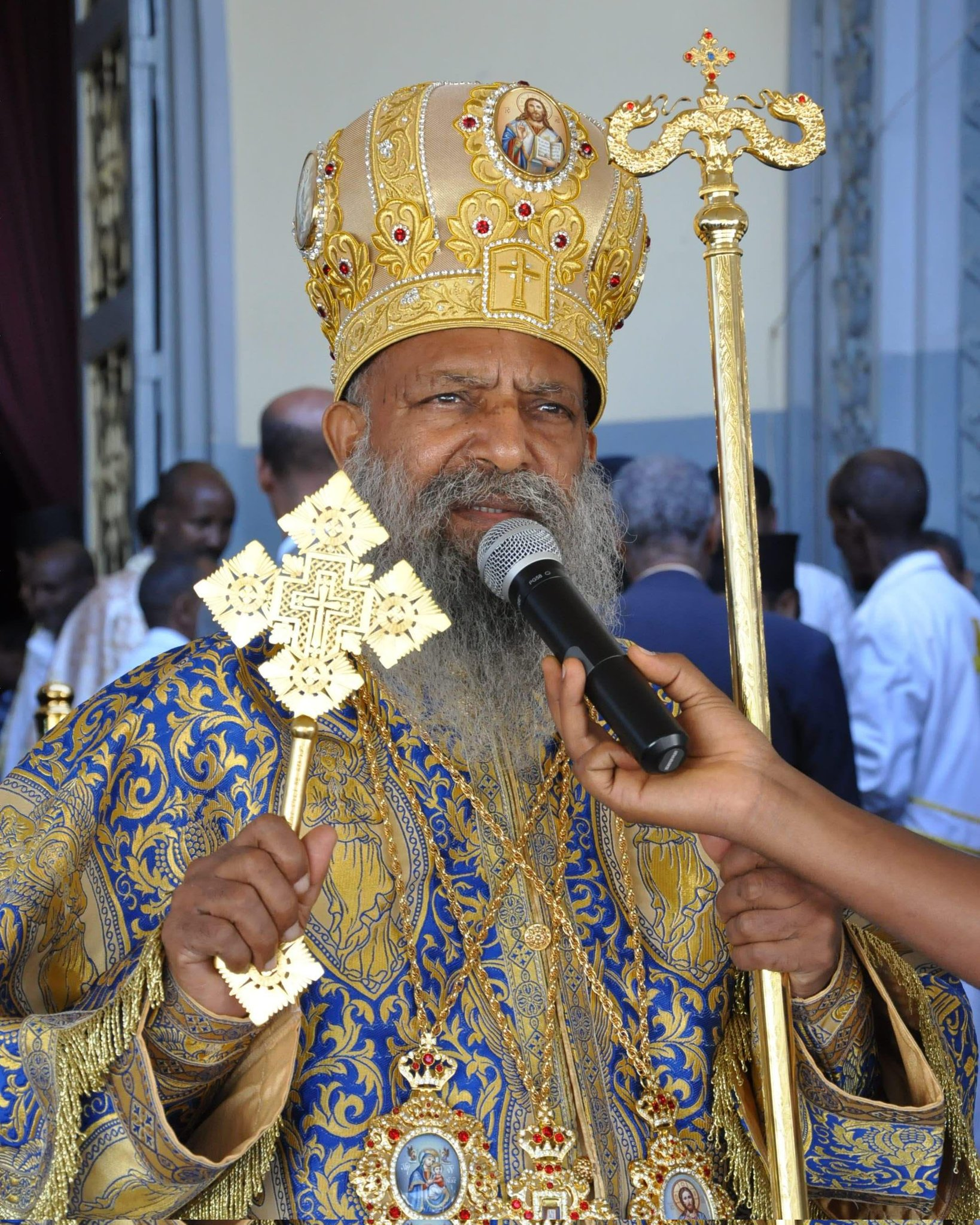
- Incumbent; Mathias; Since 28 February 2013
- Style: His Holiness

Information
- First holder: St. Frumentius (Bishop); Basilios (Patriarch)
- Established: c. 350 (Foundation); 1959 (Autocephaly)
- Cathedral: Holy Trinity Cathedral, Addis Ababa

This is a list of the abunas of Ethiopia, the spiritual heads of the Ethiopian Orthodox Tewahedo Church. The Abuna of Ethiopia is known officially as His Holiness Patriarch and Catholicos of Ethiopia, Archbishop of Axum and Ichege of the See of St. Tekle Haymanot. The current Abuna, Mathias, acceded to this position on 28 February 2013.

The Ethiopian Orthodox Tewahedo Church is part of the Oriental Orthodox communion, and it was granted autocephaly by Cyril VI, Pope of the Coptic Orthodox Church, in 1959.

== Bishops of Axum ==
Portrait	Abuna (Birth–Death)	Reign	Notes
	Abune Selama I Kesatay Birhan (St. Frumentius) (Died c. 383)	c. 350–383	Brought Christianity to the Kingdom of Aksum.
	Minas or Elyas		
	Abreham	Late 4th century – early 5th century	
	Petros		
	Abba Aftse	Late 5th century – early 6th century	
	Qozmos	fl. early 6th century	
	Euprepius	fl. early 6th century	
Seat vacant c. 537–562

== Metropolitan archbishops of Axum and of All Ethiopia ==
Portrait	Abuna (Birth–Death)	Reign	Notes
	Qerellos	620s – mid 7th century	
	unknown		
	Yohannes	c. 820–840	
	Yaqob I	fl. mid 9th century	
	Salama Za-'Azeb	fl. 9th century	
	Bartalomewos	fl. 10th century	
	Peter	920s	Opposed by Minas and Fiqtor.
Seat vacant c. 940–970s
	Daniel	fl. late 10th century	
	Fiqtor	fl. 11th century	
	'Abdun		Claimant.
	Sawiros	1077–1092	
	Giyorgis I	fl. 1090s	
	Mikael I	fl. early–mid 12th century	
	Yaqob II		
	Gabra Krestos		
	Atnatewos	fl. late 12th century	
	Mikael II	1206–1209	Opposed by Hirun.
	Yeshaq	c. 1209–1225	An inference from the Kebra Nagast colophon.
	Giyorgis II	c. 1225	
	St. Tekle Haymanot	c. 13th century	According to tradition.
	Yohannes (XIII?)	fl. 14th century	
	Yaqob (III?)	c. 1337–1344	
Seat vacant 1344–1348
	Salama II	1348–1388	
Seat vacant 1388–1398/9
	Bartalomewos	1398/9–1436	
	Mikael and Gabriel	1438–1458	
Seat vacant 1458–1481
	Yeshaq	1481–c. 1520	
	Marqos (VI?)	1481–c. 1530	
	João Bermudes	c. 1536–c. 1545	Self-proclaimed Ethiopian Orthodox Abuna, and Catholic Patriarch of Ethiopia and Alexandria.
	Endyras	c. 1545–?	
	Andrés de Oviedo (1518–1577)	1557–1577	Catholic bishop.
	Marqos (VII?)	c. 1565	
	Krestodolos I	c. 1590	
	Petros (VI?)	1599?–1607	Killed in battle.
	Simon (Died 1624)	1608–1617	
	Afonso Mendes (1579–1659)	1622–1632	Catholic Patriarch, supported by Susenyos I and deposed by Fasilides.
Seat vacant 1632–1633
	Rezek	c. 1634	
	Marqos (VIII?)	c. 1635–1672	Deposed with Krestodolos.
	Krestodolos II	c. 1640–1672	Deposed with Marqos.
	Sinoda	1672–1687	
Seat vacant 1687–1689
	Marqos (IX ?)	1689–late 17th century	
	Abba Mikael	1640–1699	
	Marqos X	1694–1716	
Seat vacant 1716–1718
	Krestodolos III	c. 1718–1745	
Seat vacant 1745–c. 1747
	Yohannes XIV	c. 1747–1770	
	Yosab III	1770–1803	
Seat vacant 1803–c. 1808
	Makarios	fl. c. 1808	
Seat vacant c. 1808–1816
	Qerellos III	1816–1829	
Seat vacant 1829–1841
	Salama III (Died 1867)	1841–1867	
Seat vacant 1867–1868
	Atnatewos II (Died 1876)	1868–1876	Died of wounds received at the Battle of Gura in the Egyptian–Ethiopian War.
Seat vacant 1876–1881
	Petros VII (Died 1917)	1881–1889	
	Mattheos X (1843–1926)	1889–1926	
	Qerellos IV (c. 1880–1950)	1926–1936	First tenure; deposed following the Second Italo-Ethiopian War.
Seat vacant 1936–1937
	Abraham	1937–1939	Installed during the Italian occupation.
	Yohannes XV	1939–1945	Installed during the Italian occupation.
	Qerellos IV (c. 1880–1950)	1945–1950	Second tenure; restored.
Seat vacant 1950–1951
	Basilios (1891–1970)	1951–1959	Elevated to Patriarch and Catholicos of All Ethiopia.

On 13 July 1948, the Coptic Orthodox and Ethiopian churches reached an agreement that led to the elevation of the Ethiopian Orthodox Tewahedo Church to the rank of an Autonomous Church; allowing the Archbishop of All Ethiopia to consecrate on his own bishops and metropolitans for the Ethiopian Church and to form a local Holy Synod. The Archbishop, however, is consecrated by the Pope of Alexandria along with the members of the Holy Synod of the Ethiopian Orthodox Tewahedo Church.

== Patriarchs and catholicoi of All Ethiopia ==
No.	Portrait	Abuna (Birth–Death)	Reign	Notes
1		Basilios (1891–1970)	1959–1970	Reigned during the 1960 Ethiopian coup attempt and the 1965 Conference of Addis Ababa. Born in Mada Mikael as Gebre Giyorgis Wolde Tsadik
2		Theophilos (1910–1979)	1971–1976	Confirmed by the Emperor after his election. Deposed and arrested by the Derg; executed by strangling in 1979. Born in Debre Elias as Meliktu Jenbere
3		Takla Haymanot (1918–1988)	1976–1988	Met Pope John Paul II in 1981, in the first such meeting in modern times. Born in Begemder as Melaku Wolde Mikael
4		Merkorios (1938–2022)	1988–2022	Deposed by the EPRDF, which claimed that he willingly abdicated. Headed the Ethiopian Orthodox Church in Exile from 1991 to 2018. Entered into dual patriarch arrangement alongside Abune Mathias from 2018 to 2022. Born in Begemder as Ze-Libanos Fanta
5		Paulos (1936–2012)	1992–2012	Reign disputed by followers of Abune Merkorios. Born in Adwa as Gebremedhin Woldeyohannes
6		Mathias (born 1941)	2013–present	Reign disputed by followers of Abune Merkorios until 2018. Entered into dual patriarch arrangement alongside Abune Merkorios from 2018 to 2022. Born in Agame as Teklemariam Asrat

In 1959, the Coptic Orthodox Church granted autocephaly to the Ethiopian Orthodox Tewahedo Church, and elevated the Archbishop to the Patriarchal dignity and was enthroned with the title of: Patriarch and Re'ese Liqane Papasat Echege (Catholicos) of the Ethiopian Orthodox Tewahedo Church. The title of Ichege (Supreme Abbot) of the See of St. Tekle Haymanot of Debre Libanos was subsumed into the Patriarchate. The title of Ichege was revived and the title of Archbishop of Axum was added to the Patriarchal titles in 2005, as Axum was the seat of Ethiopia's first Bishop, St. Frumentius, and thus the oldest see in the church.

=== Timeline ===
This is a graphical timeline of the patriarchs and catholicoi of All Ethiopia. They are listed in order of first assuming office.

The following chart lists the patriarchs and catholicoi by lifespan, with the years outside of their tenure in blue.

== See also ==
- Coptic Christianity
- Eritrean Orthodox Tewahedo Church
  - List of abunas of Eritrea
- Ethiopian ecclesiastical titles
- Tigrayan Orthodox Tewahedo Church
- Latin Patriarchate of Ethiopia

== Sources ==
- Modern Primates of Ethiopia (1694–present)
