= Abuna Theophilos =

Patriarch of the Ethiopian Orthodox Tewahedo Church from 1971 to 1979

His Holiness Abune Theophilos
- Patriarch and Catholicos of Ethiopia
- Church: Ethiopian Orthodox Tewahedo Church
- Installed: 9 May 1971
- Term ended: 14 July 1979
- Predecessor: Abuna Basilios
- Successor: Abune Takla Haymanot

Orders
- Ordination: 1937 (Priesthood)
- Consecration: 25 July 1948

Personal details
- Born: Mel'ektu Wolde-Mariam; 24 April 1910 Debre Elias, Machakel Woreda, Gojjam Province, Ethiopian Empire (now Debre Elias, East Gojjam, Ethiopia)
- Died: 14 July 1979 (aged 69) former palace of Prince Asrate Kassa, Addis Ababa, Ethiopia
- Buried: Gofa St. Gabriel Church, Addis Ababa

Abuna Theophilos (24 April 1910 – 14 July 1979), also known as Abune Tewophilos, was the second Patriarch of the Ethiopian Orthodox Tewahedo Church. He officially succeeded Abuna Basilios in 1971 after he had assumed the role of acting patriarch upon Abuna Basilios's death in 1970. - and through dedicated service to his church he ultimately became a martyr for his faith.

== Early life and education as a theologian ==
Abuna Theophilos was born as Meliktu Jenbere on 24 April 1910 in the Parish of Debre Elias, district of Debre Marqos, in Gojjam. His parents were Ato („Mr.“) Jenbere Wube and Woizero („Mrs.“) Zeritu Adelahu. After serving and studying at the Monastery of Debre Elias and at the Addis Alem St. Mary of Zion Monastery, Meliktu Jenbere received monastic orders at the Monastery of Debre Libanos in 1937 and received ordination as a priest from Abuna Abraham, Archbishop of Gojjam.

== Career ==
In 1942, not long after Emperor Haile Selassie returned from exile, Abba Meliktu was made administrating priest with the title of Memher of the Mekane Selassie ("House of the Trinity") Monastery in Addis Ababa. Later, with the completion of the Cathedral at this monastery, he was made Dean of this new Holy Trinity Cathedral with the title of Lique Siltanat ("Arch-hierarch").

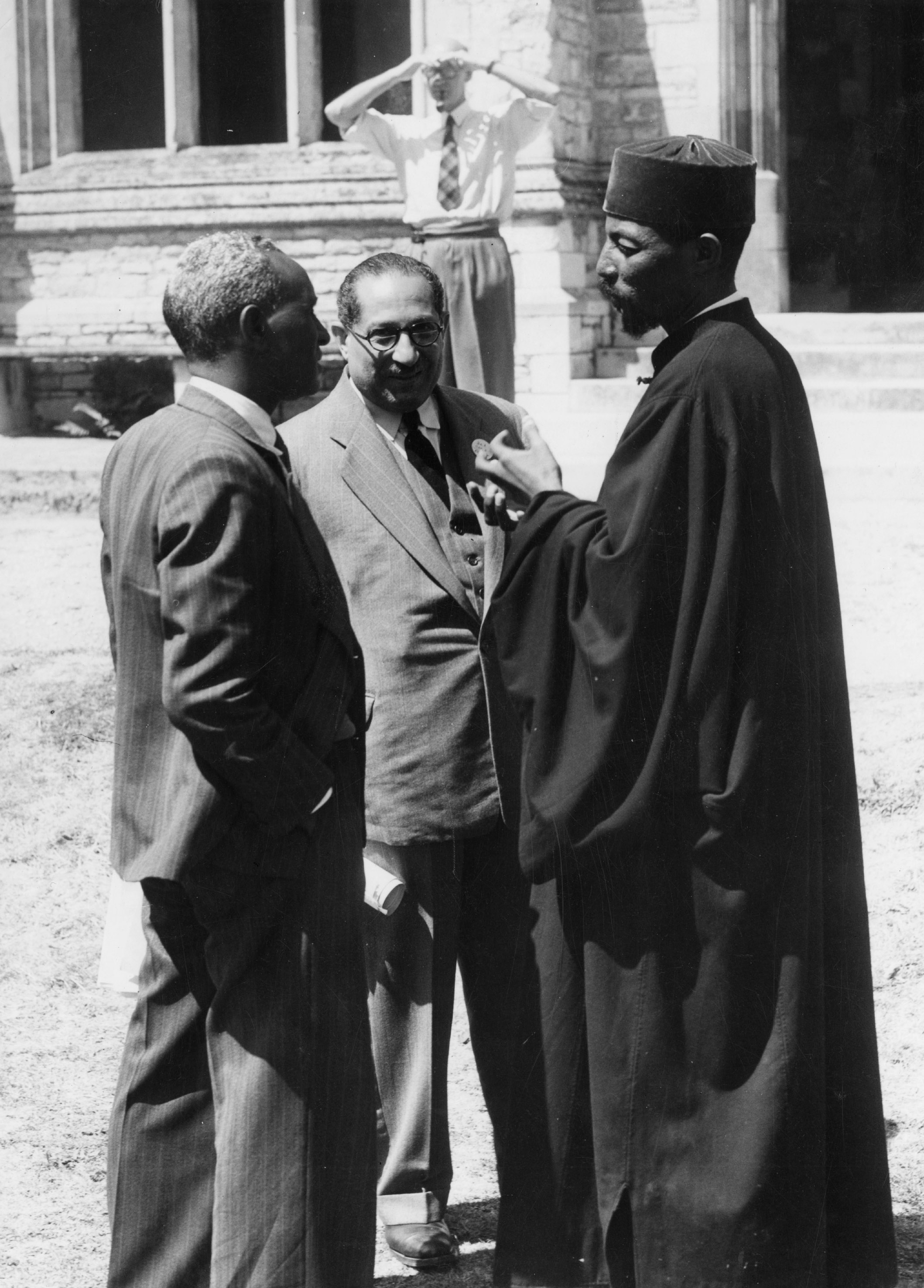
Abuna Theophilos as bishop of Harar, in conversation with two unidentified persons at a meeting of the Central Committee of the World Council of Churches (WCC) in Chichester, England in 1949.

Then in 1947, Lique Siltanat Abba Meliktu traveled to Cairo with other high clerics to be made bishops by the Coptic Pope Yusab, the Patriarch of Alexandria. At the same time that Abuna Basilios became Ethiopia's first native-born Metropolitan Archbishop, Abba Meliktu was anointed as bishop of Harar with the name Abuna Theophilos. He was also appointed as the personal representative of Pope Yusab to the Synod of the Ethiopian Orthodox Tewahedo Church. After Abuna Basilios was made Patriarch of Ethiopia by the Coptic Pope Kyrillos, Abuna Theophilos was elevated by the first Patriarch of Ethiopia to Archbishop of Harrar. Between 1951 and 1970, Theophilos served as regent and deputy for the ailing Patriarch Abune Basilios, and towards the end of this period was performing the role of acting Patriarch. Theophilos attended the Congress of the World Council of Churches which was held at Uppsala in July 1968. Upon the death of Abuna Basilios in 1970, Abuna Theophilos was elected on 7 April 1971, confirmed by the Emperor on 13 April 1971 and enthroned in Addis Ababa on 9 May 1971 as the second Patriarch of Ethiopia.

== Second Patriarch of Ethiopia ==
Theophilos presided over a period of administrative reform in the Ethiopian Orthodox Church. Attempts were made to bring the church into the 20th century by introducing modern educational methods both in the theological schools and in the churches themselves. Theophilos encouraged ecumenical ties with other Oriental and Eastern Orthodox Churches, and began the process of rapprochement with the Roman Catholic Church. In October 1971 Tewophilos, at the invitation of the Patriarchs of Constantinople and Alexandria, paid a two-week-long visit to Egypt, Greece, and Turkey. In early 1973 he visited the United States. Also in 1973, he was visited by Pope Shenouda III of the Coptic Orthodox Church, Archbishop Makarios, President and Greek Orthodox Primate of Cyprus, and Patriarch Pimen of All Russia. Theophilos at various times visited the Holy Land, several Orthodox sees in Eastern Europe, and also toured the new Ethiopian Orthodox parishes in the Caribbean basin. In February 1972 Theophilos consecrated six new bishops at Holy Trinity Cathedral, the first of two consecrations he carried out during his brief incumbency.

In 1974, the Ethiopian Revolution toppled the monarchy in Ethiopia, and the Marxist-Leninist Derg regime replaced Emperor Haile Selassie in government. The government was officially atheist, but equality of religions was proclaimed, and the Ethiopian Church ceased to be the state church. While at first staying out of politics, Theophilos became disillusioned with the Derg's ideology, and was horrified by the massacre of 60 ex-officials of the Emperor's government in November 1974. He was refused permission to receive the remains of Emperor Haile Selassie after his death in unclear circumstances in August 1975 and was warned not to conduct public memorial services in his name.

With the disestablishment of the church and the severing of ties between church and state, Theophilos believed that he was entitled to make all decisions concerning the church independent of the authorities, and appointed and consecrated three new bishops without consulting the Derg. These bishops were Abuna Paulos, (who would eventually become the fifth Patriarch of the Ethiopian Orthodox Tewahido Church), Bishop Abune Basilios, and Bishop Abune Petros (not to be confused with Abune Petros). The Derg then arrested Theophilos in May 1976, along with the three newly consecrated bishops. The Synod of the Ethiopian Orthodox Church was ordered by the Derg to elect a new leader, and Patriarch Abuna Takla Haymanot was elected to lead the church. The Coptic Patriarchate in Egypt, however, denounced the imprisonment of Theophilos, and refused to recognize the election and enthronement of the new Abuna. The Coptic Church argued that the removal of Theophilos was not canonical as it was done by the government and not by the Synod of the Orthodox Church, nor had Theophilos abdicated. As a result, ties between the Coptic and Ethiopian Orthodox Churches were severed.

== Imprisonment ==
Theophilos was seized at the Patriarchal Palace in the precincts of the Saint of Saint's St. Mary's Patriarchal Monastery, and taken to the Emperor's former residence, the Jubilee Palace (renamed the National Palace by the Derg regime) on 17 February 1976. He was placed under solitary confinement in rooms formerly reserved for the use of Rear Admiral Prince Eskinder Desta, the Emperor's grandson who had been executed with the 60 Imperial ex-officials in November 1974.

One afternoon of uncertain date Theophilos managed to escape from the palace disguised as a layman while soldiers guarding the palace were distracted by a broadcast soccer match. Theophilos later told fellow prisoners that he had thought to head to the Greek Embassy, but then decided to make his way to the Asebot monastery in his former diocese of Harrar in the east of the country. He made his way to the Gofa St. Gabriel's Church to hide and prepare for his journey to Asebot, counting on the loyalty of the clergy at this church, but his location was reported to the Derg by someone at the church, and he was taken back into custody.

Theophilos was escorted barefoot to the old Menelik (Grand) Palace and again placed in solitary confinement, chained to his bed, his hands and feet cuffed. Four days later, he was taken to join Ward 1 of the Menelik Palace prison where the highest ranking surviving officials of the Imperial government were being held. Theophilos is believed to have entered into a severe fast (essentially a hunger strike) for 40 days and only broke it on Easter Monday after two imprisoned elder noblemen, Bitwoded Zewde Gebre-Hiwot (former mayor of Addis Ababa and President of the Imperial Senate of Ethiopia) and Dejazmach Haregot Abay (former Crown Councilor and noble and parliamentarian of Eritrea) pleaded with him on their knees.

Theophilos was subjected to numerous indignities while imprisoned. The gold handcross he had been given by the Emperor upon his enthronement was taken from him, along with an icon of the crucifixion that he kept by his bed. He was also ordered to sign papers as "Abba Meliktu" his pre-episcopal name, which he steadfastly refused to do, signing his name always as "Abune Tewophilos". He asked repeatedly that he be imprisoned in a monastery such as Asebot or elsewhere, but was refused. Theophilos conducted prayer services for his fellow prisoners twice daily and said the Holy Liturgy of the Mass every Sunday, assisted by the imprisoned Nebre-Id Ermias of Axum.

In July 1979, the Derg ordered the immediate execution of several more high officials of the Emperor's government. On 10 July 1979, nobleman and the Emperor's close aide, Tsehafi Taezaz Teferrawork, and former minister Seifu Mahteme Selassie were summoned and removed from the Palace prison and did not return. On 12 July 1979, former ministers Yohannes Kidane Mariam, Abebe Kebede, and Assefa Defaye were similarly taken away. It became obvious to the other prisoners that the men had been executed, and in preparation, many of them approached imprisoned clergy for absolution of their sins.

Finally, on Saturday, 14 August 1979 on the feast day of the Holy Trinity, Dejazmatch Kassa Wolde Mariam and General Samuel were summoned. Dejazmatch Kassa Wolde Mariam, heir to the old Oromo Kingdom of Leqa Qellam, former President of Haile Selassie University, and grandson-in-law to Emperor Haile Selassie, was on his knees before Theophilos receiving his final absolution before going to his death when Theophilos himself was called. He turned and asked Nebre-Id Ermias to absolve him, and he left the prison together with Dejazmatch Kassa.

== Martyrdom and death ==
Theophilos and his fellow prisoners were taken to the former palace of Prince Asrate Kassa and were executed and buried there.

On 14 August 1979, Theophilos was strangled by an electrical wire and killed. He was buried face-down in a deep trench grave. His remains would later be identified by long black clerical robes and a monk's cap.

Following the fall of the Derg regime, Theophilos' remains were disinterred from the grounds of the former palace of Prince Asrate Kassa, and reburied in full ceremonial state at the Gofa St. Gabriel Church which he himself had built in southern Addis Ababa and was canonized.

The significance of Abuna Theophilos' life and work goes beyond the dates of his existence; it includes both theological and ecclesiastical-political aspects. His violent death at the hands of the atheist Derg regime which had recently overthrown Emperor Haile Selassie and the established order, clearly marks him as a martyr for his faith and his church.

== See also ==
- List of abunas of Ethiopia

Oriental Orthodox titles
Preceded by Abuna Basilios	Patriarch of the Ethiopian Orthodox Tewahedo Church; 1971–1976	Succeeded by Abuna Takla Haymanot
