= Abouna =

Abouna may refer to:

- Abuna, a religious title

== People with the surname ==
- Andraos Abouna (1943–2010), Chaldean Catholic titular bishop of Hirta and the auxiliary bishop of the Chaldean Catholic Patriarchate of Babylon
- Eliya Abuna (1862–1955), Bishop of the Assyrian Church of the East and the Chaldean Catholic Church
- Hirmis Aboona (1940–2009), Iraqi Assyrian historian
- Jean-Patrick Abouna (born 1990), Cameroonian football player
- Thierry Modo Abouna (born 1981), Cameroonian football player
- Yaqob Abuna (died 1553), Syrian Metropolitan of India

== People with the title abuna ==
- Abouna Gabriel Abdel El-Metgaly (1918–1978), Egyptian hegumen of the Coptic Orthodox Church
- Abouna Matta El Meskeen, or Father Matta El Meskeen (1919–2006), Coptic Orthodox monk
- Abouna Menassa Elkomos Youhanna (1899–1930), Coptic priest, historian and theologian

== Other uses ==
- Abouna (film), 2002, by Chadian director Mahamat Saleh Haroun
