= Enbaqom =

Ethiopian Orthodox abbot

Saint Abba Enbaqom
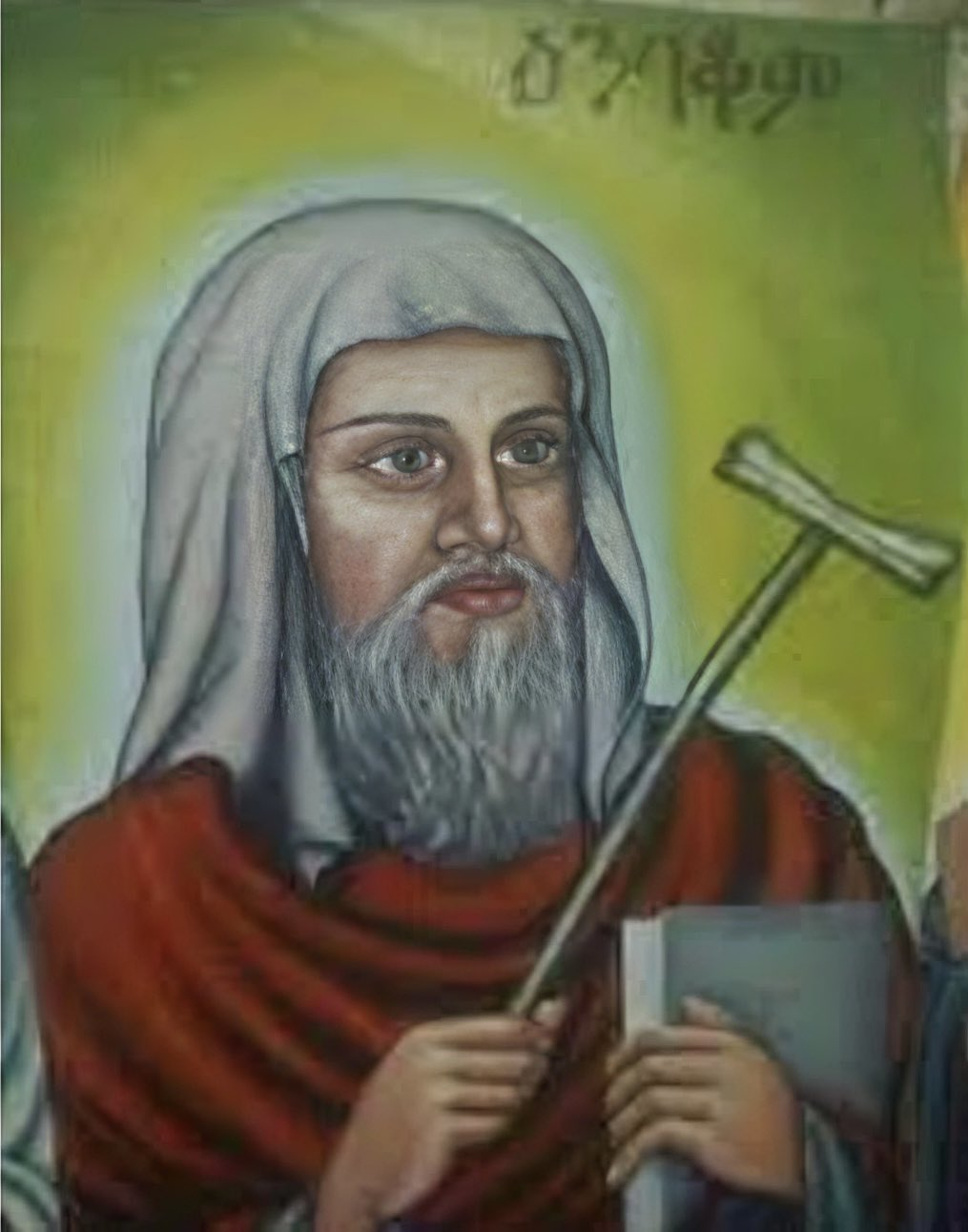

Echege of Debre Libanos
- Born: Ab'ul Fath (ابو الفتح) c. 1470; Yemen
- Residence: Ethiopia
- Died: 1565; Ethiopia
- Venerated in: Oriental Orthodoxy
- Major works: Anqasa Amin

Abba Enbaqom (Ge'ez: አባ እንባቆም, Arabic: أبّا إنباكوم, Hebrew: אבא אנבקום; c.1470 – c.1565) was a Yemeni polyglot, translator, religious leader of the Ethiopian Orthodox Tewahedo Church, and author of the Anqaṣa Amin. As Abbot at the leading monastery of Debre Libanos he became the Echege, the second highest ecclesiastical office, as well as head of all Ethiopian monasteries, and was often regarded as the most influential person in the Ethiopian Church.

== Life and views ==
Enbaqom was born c. 1470 to a Jewish mother and Muslim father in Yemen. He was a devout Muslim in his youth up until he grew intensely involved in questioning his religious affiliation. Eventually, after much reading and discussion, he decided to convert and become a Christian. His teacher Petros, then Echage or Abbot of the leading Ethiopian monastery at Debre Libanos in Shewa, baptized him, giving him the name Enbaqom, the Ethiopian form of Habakkuk; while the Hebrew name signifies "savant", the Ethiopian has the connotation of "professor".

After further prayer and learning Enbaqom circa 1500 became a monk at Debre Libanos. By his study he acquired many languages, including: Arabic, Geʽez, Coptic, Hebrew, Syriac, Armenian, Portuguese, and Italian. Throughout his clerical life he worked to translate into Geez, the language of the Ethiopian Church, many Christian writings, e.g., John Chrysostom's Commentary on the Epistle to the Hebrews, and the story from India of Barlaam and Josaphat. For his writings he won wide respect.

At the court of the Emperor Lebna Dengel, Enbaqom become the friend of the Abuna Marqos, the chief ecclesiastic in Ethiopia. During this Emperor's reign Enbaqom became the Echage, i.e., the Abbot at the Debre Libanos monastery. While at court Enbaqom also met the Portuguese priest Francisco Álvares. Later this priest visited Enbaqom at the monastery, teaching him Portuguese and Latin. Álvares reports that in 1520 he was at Dabra Libanos when the Emperor Libna Dengel installed a new Echage:

"He whom they made Ichee was also held to be a man of holy life, and he had been a Moor. As he was a great friend of mine, he told me all his life and said to me that when he was in his sect [i.e., a Muslim] he heard a revelation, which said to him: 'You are not following the right path; go to the Abima Marcos, who is head of the priests of Ethiopia, and he will teach you another path'. Then he came to the Abima Marcos, and related to him what he had heard, and the Abima Marcos had made him a Christian, and had taught him, and considered him as a son; and therefore the [Emperor] took this monk who had been a Moor for governor of this monastery... . This man had so much affection for me that he used not to leave me and always went about with me. [He] also mastered the Portuguese language, so we both understood one another very well."

Álvares says that the new Echage also knew how to write Latin in good style. This, of course, sounds like Enbaqom; yet Álvares gives his name as Jacob. Van Donzel, however, assures us that Enbaqom is this Jacob who Álvares describes in some detail. Accordingly at the death of Petros, Enbaqom had become the eleventh Echage at Dabra Libanos, which was the second highest office in the Ethiopian Church (after the Coptic Abuna).

Yet Enbaqom next entered a long period of turbulence. He was accused of disloyalty to the Emperor Lebna Dengel, then tried and, in lieu of death, banished. A year later the Emperor forgave and recalled him, but he may not have returned as Abbot. Instead, he may have withdrawn further southeast to Warab by the headwaters of the river Awash. Then during the years 1526-1543 there came upon them very destructive raids led by the Muslim Ahmad Gran which destabilized the region and threatened the continued existence of Christian kingdom. During these decades of chaos and anarchy, Enbaqom kept on the move, relocating westward to Gafat then to Bizamo, both regions located south of the Abbay River or Blue Nile.

In 1532 the monastery at Debre Libanos had been torched, enveloped in flames due to the forces of Ahmad Gran. Enbaqom in that year sent a letter in Arabic addressed to Ahmad Gran, writing that he should stop destroying churches and monasteries (whose libraries held the literary history of the people), and that he should stop killing priests and monks. Ahmad Gran evidently replied in effect that as a Muslim he respected the Jewish Torah and the Christian Gospels, so he would not burn churches and would limit the killing to those who resist. Enbaqom book in Geez Anqasa Amin grew out of this letter to Ahmad Gran.

Because of his unusual background, Enbaqom was better able to address Christian Ethiopians about effective ways to understand and to resist Islam. From such a partisan point of view, he was in an "admirable position to meet their needs, and his presence was seen as providential. While Ahmad did all he could to capture and execute him, Enbaqom moved from place to place comforting the faithful."

The new Emperor Galawdewos returned Enbaqom to favor, making him his councilor in war. Perhaps too the learned Enbaqom influenced Galawdewos when he wrote his well-known "Confession of Faith" which diplomatically presents a theological and liturgical response to the Catholic Church. The next Emperor Menas allowed the monk to become the Echage again at Debre Libanos. In a few years later Enbaqom would see his last.

Abba Enbaqom sought "to provide spiritual and intellectual leadership for the Ethiopian Church, and to translate works and ideas from the rest of Christendom, thus bringing a richer theology from abroad and higher standards of clerical education... ." The Ethiopian Church celebrates his life on the 21st of miyazya (corresponding to April 29) in the liturgical year.

== Anqaṣa Amin ==
His book Anqasa Amin [Gateway of Faith], written in Geez, was an expansion and scholarly development of his 1532 letter in Arabic to the Muslim invader Ahmad Gran. It is perhaps the only Ethiopian Church writing with so many quotations from and references to the Qur'an (Enbaqom relied on his memory for many of these). The book is polemical, however, and was never popular. The arguments employed by Enbaqom "seem mostly drawn from the standard Arab Christian responses to Islam." For example: Jesus in the Qur'an has greater stature than many Muslims will admit.

Enbaqom on occasion draws some interesting parallels. The Muslim Laylat al-Qadr [night of power or night of decrees] during Ramadan commemorates the first revelations of the Qur'an to Muhammad, when it is said that the angels and the Spirit will descend until dawn. For Enbaqom this refers to Noel, Christmas night, when the Deity came here to earth, the night of his birth, when bands of angels filled the sky singing, "Glory to God in the highest and peace to his people on earth!"

Enbaqom discusses the process of his own coverstion to Christianity, which began when he heard a passage from the Qur'an discussing Jesus in the divine plan. According to Enbaqom, many Muslims then held three false beliefs about Christianity: that God had a wife and a son; that Christians worship trees, stones, and images; and that Christians admit of three Gods.

Two original arguments made by Enbaqom have been noted. First, that the Qur'an relies on only one language, Arabic, and the Judaic scriptures on Hebrew with some Aramaic. The Christian Gospels, however, communicate effectively their spiritual message in many different languages. Second, the Qur'an and the Judaic scriptures give prescriptions for war and the like. Christian scriptures do not, but are addressed to the welfare of the poor.

The Anqasa Amin is an argumentative work, written in the midst of long-term and widespread chaos, destruction, and death. In it Enbaqom demonstrates familiarity with Christian doctrine and prior Christian polemics, and also with Muslim religious literature.

== Bibliography ==
PRIMARY SOURCES:

- E. A. Wallis Budge, The Book of the Saints of the Ethiopian Church (Cambridge 1928), 4 volumes; translation of the Synaxaire.
- E. J. Van Donzel, Enbaqom, Anqaṣa Amin (La Porte de las Foi). Introduction, texte critique, traduction (Leiden: E. J. Brill 1969). The text of Enbaqom is at 165-263, with facing pages of Geez in its alphabet and the French translation; Van Donzel's introduction and scholarly apparatus are at 1-164 and 265-302.
- Lanfraco Ricci, "La Vite di Enbaqom e di Yohannes, Abbati di Dabra Libanos di Scioa" in Ressagna di Studi Etiopici (Roma e Napoli), at 13: 91-120 (1954); 14: 69-107 (1959). This is a translation from the Geez of the Gadl [Acts or Struggles] of Enbaqom and of Yohannes, both Abbots at the Dabra Libanos monastery in Shewa.
- Francisco Álvares, Verdadera Informaçam das terras do Preste Joam das Indias (Lisbon: Luís Rodrigues 1540), edited and translated as The Prester John of the Indies (Cambridge University for the Hakluyt Society 1961), two volumes. Here an 1881 English translation is revised, with commentary, and edited by C. F. Beckingham and G. W. B. Huntingford.
- Galawdewos, "Confession of Faith" at 104-107 in J. M. Harden, An Introduction to Ethiopic Christian Literature (London: S.P.C.K. 1926).

SECONDARY SOURCES:

- Enrico Cerulli, Storia della letteratura etiopica (Milan 1956).
- Getachew Haile, "Enbaqom" in Biographical Dictionary of Christian Missions, edited by Gerald H. Anderson (Grand Rapids, Michigan: W. B. Eerdman's Publishing 1998).
- Adrian Hastings, The Church in Africa, 1450-1950 (Oxford University Press 1994).
- Richard Pankurst, "Abba 'Enbaqom, Iman Ahmad Ibn Ibrahim, and the Conquest of Ethiopia" in the Addis Triburne, November 25, 2003, reprinted by the Awdal News Network.
- Taddesse Tamrat, Church and State in Ethiopia 1270-1527 (Oxford University: Clarendon Press 1972).
- J. Spencer Trimingham, Islam in Ethiopia (Oxford University 1952); reprint: Frank Cass, London, 1965.

TERTIARY SOURCES:

- David Buxton, The Abyssinians (New York: Praeger, 1970).
- Chris Prouty and Eugene Rosenfeld, Historical Dictionary of Ethiopia (Metuchen NJ: The Scarecrow Press 1981).
