= Bartalomewos II of Ethiopia =

Head of the Ethiopian Orthodox Church from 1938 to sometime after 1434

Bartalomewos of Ethiopia was an Abuna, or head of the Ethiopian Orthodox Church from 1398/99 to sometime after 1434; he succeeded Abuna Salama II. His tenure was a period marked by a series of doctrinal disputes in the Church, and at one point Bartalomewos was accused of denying the threefold nature of the Holy Trinity. Emperor Yeshaq appointed a committee to investigate this serious charge, whose members included graduates of the school at Istifanos Monastery in Lake Hayq.

During this period the Abun was appointed by the Pope of Alexandria and Patriarch of All Africa, who had diocesan authority over Ethiopia and the rest of Africa, at the request of the Emperor of Ethiopia, usually after paying a substantial fee to the Muslim government for the privilege.

The existence of Abuna Bartalomewos is confirmed by at least two records of grants to Istifanos monastery. One is dated only to the reign of Emperor Yishaq. The other is dated to "Year 6924 of Grace [sic] from Adam according to the reckoning of the Egyptians, and Year of Grace 84 according to the reckoning of us Ethiopians", which corresponds to AD 1431/1432. Bartalomewos is attested as still in office after Zara Yaqob became emperor in 1434, so Taddesse Tamrat concludes he died between that year and when one Mika'el served as an interim Abuna in 1436.

== See also ==
- List of abunas of Ethiopia
