= Abuna Dioskoros (Ethiopian bishop) =

Ethiopian bishop (1919–1997)

His Holiness Abune Dioskoros
- Native name: አቡነ ዲዮስቆሮስ
- Church: Bethesaida Kidist Mariam Church
- Province: West Shewa
- Diocese: South West Shewa and Chebona Gurage
- Elected: 1976

Personal details
- Born: Woldetensae Gizaw; March 1919 Itisa Debre Tsilalsh, Shewa, Ethiopian Empire
- Died: 26 March 1997 (aged 77–78)
- Parents: Kesis Gizaw Zeyohnes (father); Woizero Zenebech Yeshi (mother)

Abuna Dioskoros (né Woldetensae Gizaw; March 1919 – 26 March 1997), also called Aba Woldetensae, was the bishop of the dioceses of South West Shewa and Chebona Gurage diocese of the Ethiopian Orthodox Tewahedo Church.

A charity for the welfare of mothers and children was named after Aba Woldetensae Gizaw.

== Life ==
Abuna Dioskoros was born as Woldetensae Gizaw in March 1919 near the monastery of Itisa Debre Tsilalsh, Tegulet and Bulga Awraja, Shewa to a clerical family. His father, a married priest, was named Kesis Gizaw Zeyohnes and his mother was Woizero Zenebech Yeshi. His family claimed descent from the same family that produced the deeply revered Ethiopian Saint Abuna Tekle Haymanot. Young Woldetensae was ordained a deacon by the Coptic Archbishop of Ethiopia, Abuna Qerellos in 1929. He later joined the resistance against the Italian occupation for five years from 1936 to 1941. Upon the liberation of Ethiopia and the restoration of Emperor Haile Selassie in 1941, Woldetensae entered the Debre Libanos Monastery and took monastic vows becoming a monk priest.

He also served as a priest in Harar, Dire Dawa, Ogaden and Addis Ababa. In 1954, he went to Woliso, then called Ghion, where he began preaching to the local population. Abba Woldetensae's reputation as a healer and an exorcist of evil spirits through prayer and holy water spread, and pilgrims flocked to him from around Ethiopia and indeed from outside the country as well. He established the Bethesaida Kidist Mariam (St. Mary of Bethesda) Church and Monastery at Woliso. This church has since become a popular place of pilgrimage for Ethiopian Christians as well as people from other religions.

Statue of Abuna Dioskoros in Ethiopian Orthodox Church compound

Abba Woldetensae was made a bishop of the Ethiopian Orthodox Church in 1976, taking the name of Dioskoros. Abuna Dioskoros served as Bishop of the West Shoa and Gurage Diocese in Central Ethiopia. After he died, his body was interred in the church and his statue stands in the compound. Many pilgrims still travel to his church seeking cure and religious blessings. The church claims that over 9 million people have been treated with its holy water since it was established, miraculously curing many illnesses which range from blindness, paralysis, to the evil eye and demonic possession.
