= Minas of Aksum =

Bishop of Axum in the 6th century

Minas (or Menas) was an early bishop of Aksum, probably in the sixth century. According to traditional Ethiopian historiography, he was the second abun after Frumentius (Salama I) and took the name Salama II. The Ethiopian sources, however, place the episcopate of Frumentius in the reign of King Ezana (c. 320–360) and that of Minas in the reign of Anbasa Wedem, twenty-six kings later, yet before the Arab conquest of Egypt (c. 640). This may indicate a long gap in the episcopal succession. Alternatively, it may indicate "a fresh start of vigorous Christian activities" under Minas. This would also explain why he was considered by later Ethiopians to be a second Salama.

According to the Gadla Afse, Minas was bishop when the Nine Saints came to Ethiopia between the late 4th and 6th centuries. Although there is no information on Minas' origins, modern scholars have been quick to assume he was an Egyptian. This would make him the first Egyptian abun in a continuous line down to the 20th century. His name was common in Egypt.

Minas is credited with several works of Ethiopian literature. He wrote sermons, six of which are still part of the liturgy of Ethiopian monasteries, read at designated times of the year. These six cover the Apostles, the Seventy Disciples, the Dormition of the Virgin, the Feast of the Cross, the 318 attendees of the First Council of Nicaea and the season of spring. Tradition also ascribes to him the translation of the Book of Revelation into Geʽez. The translation of the Geʽez text The Story of How the Interiors of Ethiopia Came to Christianity, an extract from Tyrannius Rufinus on the mission of Frumentius, may also be the work of Minas.

== Works ==
- An English translation of Minas' homily on the cross is found in Getatchew Haile, The Ethiopian Orthodox Church's Tradition on the Holy Cross (Leiden: Brill, 2018), pp. 112–125.
