= Gyula Bajó =

Hungarian artist

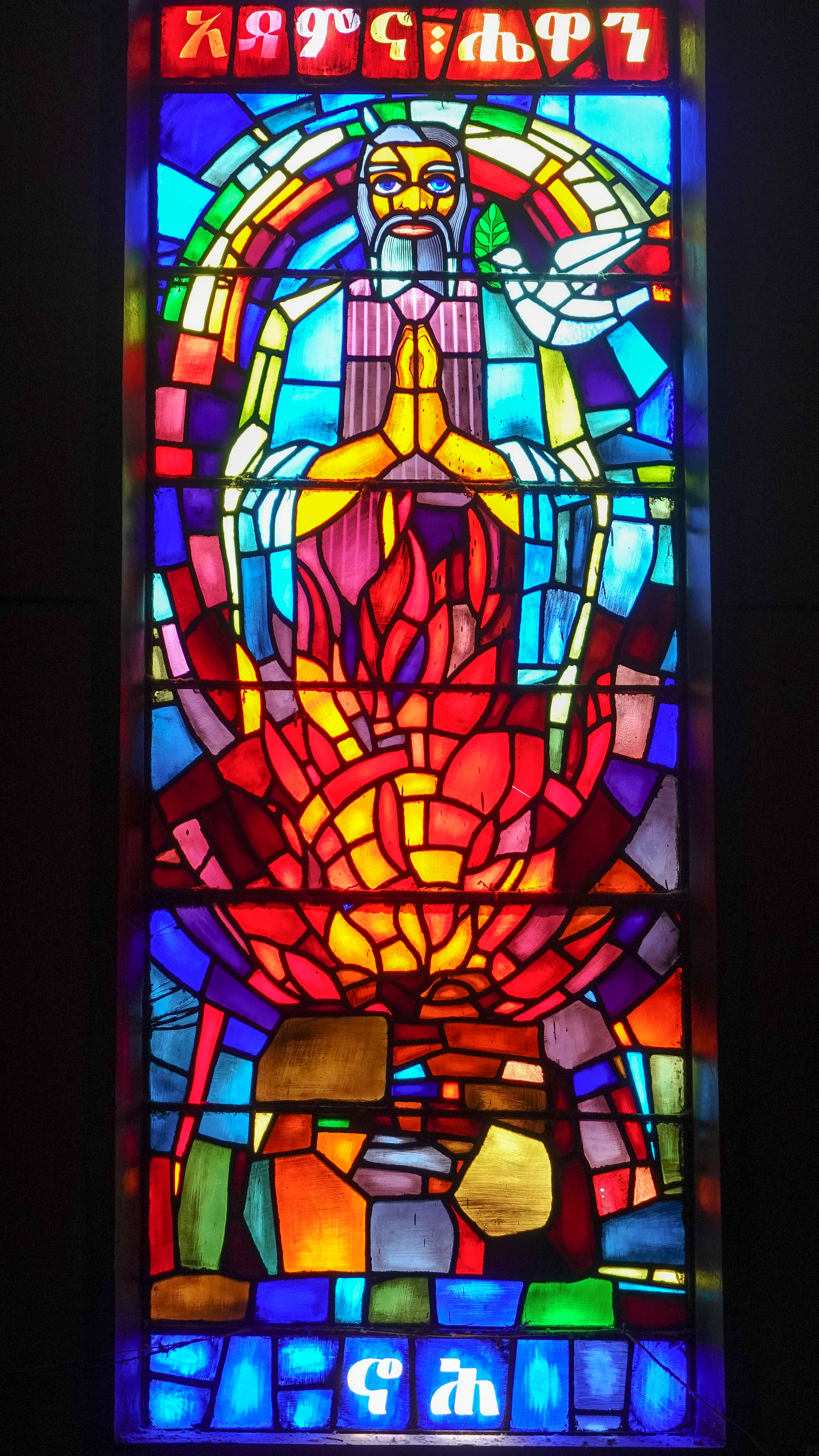
Stained-glass panel in Debre Libanos

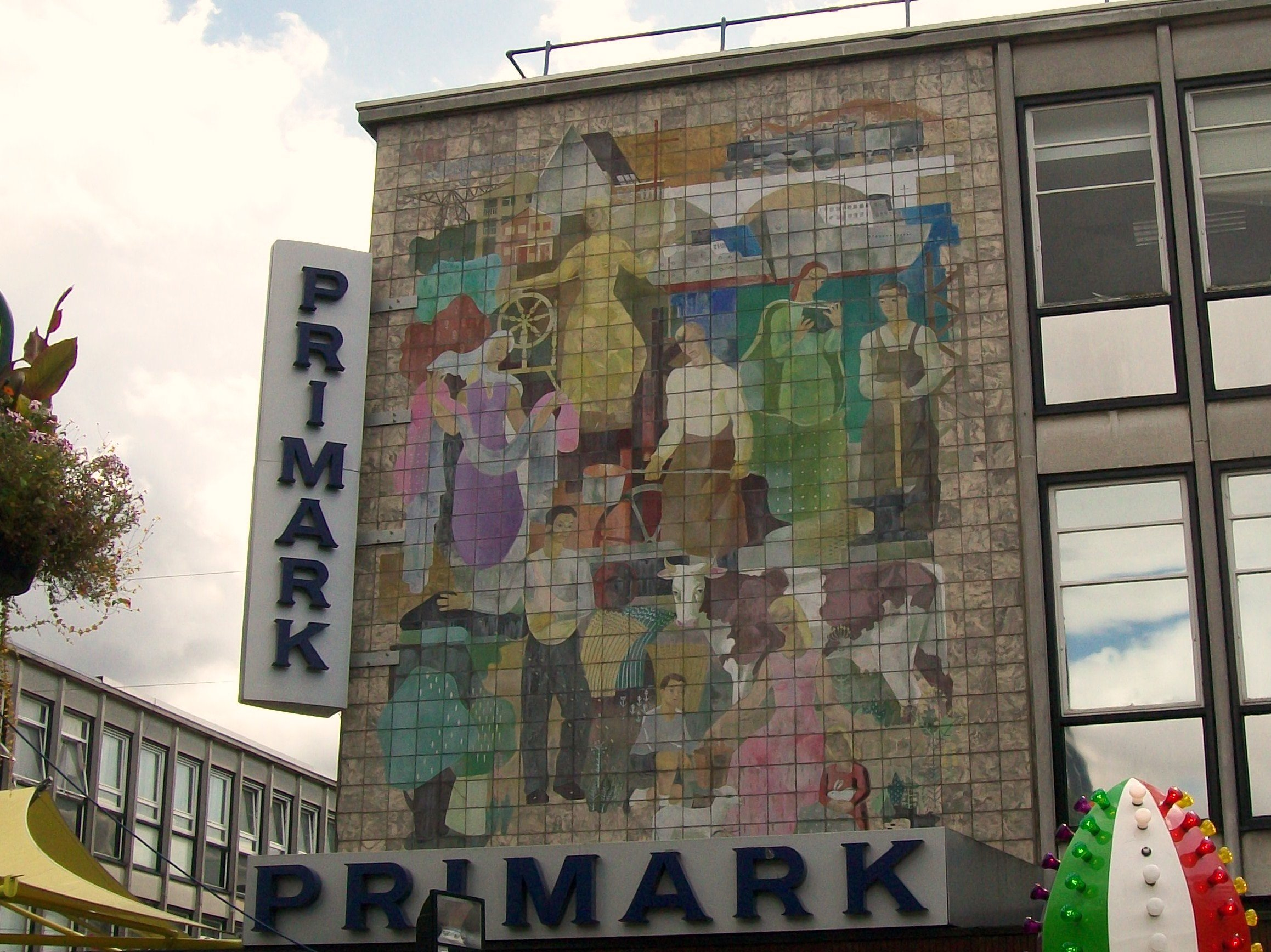
The Stevenage mural

Gyula Bajó (1907–1984) was a Hungarian artist of ceramics and glass. He emigrated to Britain after the Second World War and found employment as a labourer at a Staffordshire pottery firm. He designed tableware in his spare time before leaving in 1953 to join the architect's office of the Co-operative Wholesale Society. He designed glass and ceramic murals for their stores and offices across the country as well as mosaics and stained glass for the Debre Libanos monastery in Ethiopia.

== Biography ==
Bajó was born in Hungary, which was then part of Austria-Hungary, in 1907. He first exhibited his work in Budapest in 1932 and became a Doctor of Arts in 1942. Bajó sought refuge in England after the Second World War and, with fellow emigrant Endre Hevezi, in 1948 found work as a labourer at the Staffordshire pottery company of Booths and Colcloughs. The pair worked together, in their spare time, on the design of Bajó Ware, a modern style of tableware inspired by themes from history.

Bajó and Hevezi left the pottery in 1953 with Bajó joining the London-based architect's office of the Co-operative Wholesale Society, which runs stores across the country. Bajó specialised in ceramic art and produced a series of tiled murals for the Co-op.

The first Co-op ceramic tile mural, a 2-storey hand painted installation at Guildford, completed in 1956, has been attributed to Bajó. He afterwards (1956–57) created seven hand-painted panels for the catering department of the Co-op's Stratford administration centre, featuring tableware similar to his earlier work at Booths and Colcloughs. The mural at the Stevenage shop was completed in 1958 and a similar mural at the Stratford administration centre (completed 1961) was also likely by Bajó. Bajó completed a mural with Hevezi for the Ipswich Co-op store in 1963. The Ipswich and Stevenage are two of the four surviving Co-op murals, the others being the Co-op Mosaic at Hull by Alan Boyson and a mural at Scunthorpe by Derek W. Brown. Both of the surviving Bajó murals have been granted statutory protection as grade II listed buildings.

Bajó also collaborated with Hevezi to complete a glass mosaic mural for the Greek tourist office on Regent Street in London and a number of mosaics and stained-glass windows for the Debre Libanos monastery in Ethiopia. Bajó died in 1984.
