= Salford Star =

British magazine (2006 - 2021)

- Editor: Stephen Kingston, Steven Speed
- Categories: local
- Format: print, web
- Publisher: Mary Burns Publishing
- Total circulation: 20,000 (print) (2015)
- First issue: May 2006; 19 years ago
- Final issue: May 2021; 4 years ago
- Country: United Kingdom
- Based in: Salford
- Website: salfordstar.com

The Salford Star was a free local news, culture and campaigning magazine based in Salford, Greater Manchester, England. First published in 2006, it moved to online-only publication in 2009, although returned briefly to print in 2015–2016. It stopped publishing in 2021 for financial reasons.

== Establishment ==
The magazine was co-founded in May 2006 by journalists Steven Speed and Stephen Kingston, who had worked together re-launching a small community magazine, the Old Trafford News. Kingston had previously worked freelance for mainstream publications, including the Manchester Evening News, Elle, and The Times. He became frustrated that community articles were rarely accepted by publications, especially when critical of their sponsors; he experienced this particularly when attempting write about potential negative impacts of the 2002 Commonwealth Games on its host city of Manchester. Speed had previously worked as a photojournalist and on community media projects, and was approached by Graham Cooper, a youth worker in a residential regeneration area, to help set up a local paper written by and for Salford people. They decided it would be a not-for-profit publication, and advertised a public meeting at a local pub. The initial meeting was attended by 40 people. The magazine received funding before its launch from UnLtd, Awards for All, and Salford City Council via the East Salford Community Committee.

== Features ==
The Salford Star covered local news and culture in Salford. It also featured local history pieces, sports reporting, and ran interviews with celebrities from the area, including Christopher Eccleston, Shaun Ryder, and John Cooper Clarke. The "What's On" section contained previews and reviews of local events and performances. The magazine was vocal on local issues and sometimes took an active role in campaigning.

=== Campaigns and investigations ===
From its inception, it reported critically on local regeneration schemes and published investigations into the property development company Urban Splash, which at the time was responsible for many such schemes in the area. In its first issue it reported on the Lowry Centre, a publicly funded arts venue which had opened six years earlier, promising to ensure it was welcoming to the community. It published a photo comic of an experiment in which a reporter photographed a group of young people as they entered the building, capturing how they were quickly ejected. According to Kingston, Salford City Council said they were "very angry" about the action, but did meet community contributors to talk about the issues. In August 2009 it campaigned alongside the Tiles and Architectural Ceramics Society (TACS) and local residents to save The Tree of Knowledge, an Alan Boyson mural at Salford University that was to be demolished, resulting in the work being protected with a grade II listed status.

=== Recurring features ===
The Salford Star issued a satirical series of awards called the Mary Burns Awards (named after the local historical figure, Mary Burns). They were "awarded" every January to organisations and public figures for "stupid statements, dodgy dealings and iffy activities" during the previous year, and often featured critiques related to spending, transparency and unfulfilled promises by local public bodies and their private-sector partners. It also issued genuine awards for music and the arts, voted for by the readership.

== Distribution and participation ==
12,000 copies of the first edition were hand-delivered by local volunteers to houses in East Salford, and 3,000 more were left at community and social premises to be given out. Not enough copies of the second edition were available to meet demand, and by the third issue the print run was increased to 20,000. Over 100 volunteers worked for the magazine, including photographers, graphic designers and distributors.

=== Community projects ===
The Salford Star ran a summer spin-off youth magazines, in which children aged eight to 14 participated in journalistic activities such as holding their own press conferences. These included community relations work with local young people and children of asylum seekers. The magazine also provided training courses in journalism, photography and graphics.

== Recognition ==
The publication was shortlisted for a Paul Foot Award in 2007 and was awarded as a runner-up. It had been longlisted for the same award in 2006 for its investigation into Urban Splash. In 2008 it won the Plain English Campaign's Plain English Award for Best Regional Newspaper and a How-Do award for North West Magazine of the Year.

== Closure ==
Facing a lack of funding, the publication campaigned publicly to raise money to keep running. Since its launch, it had been unable to access public funds, with Salford Council revising the criteria for Community Committees' funding of publications. In 2018 it raised £3,000 through various means including an auction of "Salford relics". Nigel Pivaro, a regular writer for the Salford Star, auctioned a brick from recently-demolished housing in Higher Broughton. Also for sale was a bolt from a Salford gasometer, advertised as having been made famous by Ewan MacColl in the song Dirty Old Town, but this was gifted to the singer's family in thanks for a donation made by his estate. However, the publication was only temporarily saved, and closed in 2021. Plans were made for the Salford Star to be archived by the British Library and the Working Class Movement Library.
