= Bajo (disambiguation) =

The Bajo are an Indonesian ethnic group of Bajo Island.

Bajo may also refer to:

- Bajo, Patillas, Puerto Rico, a barrio in Puerto Rico
- Bajo Island, part of the Lesser Sunda Islands in Indonesia
- Bajo (name), a surname and given name
- Steven O'Donnell (Australian actor), also known as Bajo
