= Dioscorus =

Dioscorus (also Dioscoros, Dioskoros, or Dioscurus) can refer to:

- Theodore, Philippa, and Companions (including Dioscorus), 3rd-century martyr and saint
- Dioscurus, father of Saint Barbara (3rd century)
- Dioscorus (consul 442), Roman consul in 442
- Pope Dioscorus I of Alexandria, Coptic Pope of Alexandria deposed at Chalcedon for his leadership at the Second Council of Ephesus (444–454)
- Pope Dioscorus II of Alexandria, Coptic Pope of Alexandria (516–517)
- Antipope Dioscorus (died 530), papal legate to Justinian I at Constantinople; later antipope
- Dioscorus, Byzantine governor of Egypt c. 535
- Dioscorus of Aphrodito, poet and lawyer (died after 585)
- Dioscoros, Abuna Dioskoros (Aba Wolde Tensai) Ethiopian Orthodox Archbishop and miracle worker (1919–1997)
- Dioscoros, Abune Dioskoros Eritrean Orthodox Bishop of Seraye, and claimed Patriarch of Eritrea (disputed) (1935–2015)

== See also ==
- Castor and Polydeuces, known as the Dioscuri in Greek mythology
