= Abuna Yohannes XV =

Head (abuna) of the Ethiopian Orthodox Tewahedo Church from 1939 to 1945

- Abuna of Ethiopia
- Church: Ethiopian Orthodox Tewahedo Church
- In office: 1939–1945
- Predecessor: Abraham
- Successor: Qerellos IV

Personal details
- Denomination: Oriental Orthodoxy

Abuna Yohannes XV was a cleric of the Ethiopian Orthodox Tewahedo Church who served as Abuna of Ethiopia (archbishop and head of the Church) from 1939 to 1945, during the final years of the Fascist Italian occupation of Ethiopia and the early restoration of imperial rule under Emperor Haile Selassie.

== Historical context ==
The Second Italo-Ethiopian War (1935–1936) and the subsequent Fascist Italian occupation (1936–1941) disrupted both the Ethiopian state and the Ethiopian Orthodox Church. Italian authorities attempted to reorganize ecclesiastical leadership within Ethiopia, creating tensions with the Coptic Orthodox Church of Alexandria, which had historically appointed the Abuna.

Following the tenure of Abuna Abraham (1937–1939), Abuna Yohannes XV assumed leadership of the Church in 1939. Abuna Yohannes XV and his predecessor Abuna Abraham designated eleven bishops in order to constitute a full ecclesiastical hierarchy before the Italian occupation ended in 1941.

== Tenure as Abuna ==
Abuna Yohannes XV served during a transitional period marked by war, occupation, and eventual restoration. His tenure coincided with the return of Emperor Haile Selassie to Ethiopia in 1941 and the gradual re-establishment of canonical relations between the Ethiopian Church and the Coptic Church.

Scholarly studies of the Ethiopian Church during this period identify Yohannes XV as part of a generation of ecclesiastical leaders who maintained institutional continuity amid political upheaval and contributed to the eventual process that culminated in the granting of autocephaly to the Ethiopian Orthodox Church in 1951.

Detailed biographical information about Yohannes XV, including his birth and death dates, is not extensively documented in mainstream historical literature.

== Legacy ==
Abuna Yohannes XV's tenure represents a transitional episode in the history of the Ethiopian Orthodox Tewahedo Church. The ecclesiastical restructuring undertaken during and immediately after the occupation laid groundwork for the eventual recognition of an Ethiopian patriarchate and the increasing autonomy of the Church in the mid-twentieth century.

Oriental Orthodox titles
Preceded by Abraham	Abuna of Ethiopia; 1939–1945	Succeeded by Qerellos IV
