= Abuna Basilios =

Patriarch of the Ethiopian Orthodox Tewahedo Church from 1959 to 1970

His Holiness, Abuna Basilios
- Patriarch Catholicos of the Ethiopia
- Church: Ethiopian Orthodox Tewahedo Church
- Installed: 28 June 1959
- Term ended: 12 October 1970
- Predecessor: Pope Cyril VI (Before autocephaly from Coptic Church); Abuna Qerellos IV (as Archbishop of Ethiopia)
- Successor: Abuna Theophilos
- Other posts: Archbishop of Ethiopia; Blessed Echege of the See of Takla Haymanot

Orders
- Ordination: 1914 (Priesthood)
- Consecration: 25 July 1948 by Coptic Pope Yousab II

Personal details
- Born: Gebre-Giorghis Wolde-Tsadiq; 23 April 1891 Mada Mikael, Shewa Province, Ethiopian Empire (now Merhabete, North Shewa, Amhara Region, Ethiopia)
- Died: 13 October 1970 (aged 79)
- Buried: Holy Trinity Cathedral, Addis Ababa, Ethiopia

Abuna Basilios (born Gebre Giyorgis Wolde Tsadik; 23 April 1891 – 13 October 1970) was an Ethiopian Orthodox prelate who served as the first Archbishop of Ethiopia, and later the first patriarch of the Ethiopian Orthodox Tewahedo Church.

== Life ==
Patriarch Abune Basilios was born Gebre Giyorgis Wolde Tsadik in Mada Mikael, a village in the district of Merhabete in Shewa. Memhir Wolde Tsadik Solomon, his father, was a respected ecclesiastical official. In his home town Gebre Giyorgis received an elementary education at the local church then entered the Monastery of Debre Libanos where he received advanced religious education. He took the Holy Orders and became a monk at the age of 21. For the next 12 years he served in the same monastery. He went on to be appointed administrator of various churches in Ethiopia, most notably the Church of St. Mary at Menagesha. In early 1923 he was nominated Head of the Ethiopian Churches and Monasteries in Jerusalem with the title of "Memhir".

Memhir Abba Gebre Giyorgis remained in Jerusalem for two years, where he gained the theological knowledge to become Ichege of the Debre Libanos Monastery in 1933. (At the time this was the highest rank open to an Ethiopian within the church, for the office of Abuna, or archbishop, was always a cleric of the Coptic Church). During the Italian invasion, Ichege Gebre Giyorgis accompanied Emperor Haile Selassie and the Ethiopian troops to the Battle of Maychew; following the defeat in that battle the Ichege accompanied the Emperor back to Addis Ababa and participated in the decision of the Emperor to go into exile and present Ethiopia's case to the League of Nations.

During the Italian occupation, Ichege Gebre Giyorgis lived in exile in Jerusalem, where he remained in touch with the Arbegnoch, or resistance fighters inside Ethiopia. During the Italian occupation, the Coptic Archbishop of the Ethiopian Orthodox Church, Abune Kerrilos had initially submitted to Italian rule. Later, the Archbishop returned to Egypt and denounced the Italian occupation, and the Italians then un-canonically appointed the Ethiopian born Bishop of Gojjam, "Abune" Abraham as the new archbishop of the Ethiopian Orthodox church in 1937, and allowed him to anoint new bishops without the sanction of the Coptic Patriarchate of Alexandria. Upon "Abune" Abraham's death the Italian authorities replaced him with "Abune" Yohannes as archbishop. Neither the Patriarch in Egypt, nor the Emperor living in exile in Britain recognized these Archbishops appointed by the Italians. However, the exiled Imperial court also regarded the exiled Abune Kerrilos as having first collaborated with the enemy and then abandoned his flock. At the eve of Emperor Haile Selassie's return to Ethiopia, the Coptic ecclesiastical authorities suggested that the current Abuna, Kerrilos accompany the Emperor on his entrance into Ethiopia; the offer was declined and the Ichege selected instead. As Margary Perham notes, "The photographs of that dramatic moment when the Emperor stepped across the frontier in the wild region of the Upper Dinder and unfurled his flag, show the Ichegé, a fine figure of a man in his flowing black ceremonial robes, standing beside him."

Following the liberation of Ethiopia in 1941, due to the Emperor's refusal to receive or recognize "Abune" Yohannes as archbishop of the Ethiopian Orthodox Church, and the refusal of the clergy at large to countenance the return of Abune Kerrilos, "Ichege" Gebre Giyorgis acted as the chief administering cleric of the Ethiopian Church while negotiations were undertaken to regularize the status of the church with the Coptic Patriarchate.

Ichege Gebre Giyorgis was consecrated by the Coptic Pope Yussab II as Archbishop of Ethiopia with the name and style of Abuna Basilios July 1948 during a ceremony held at the Patriarchate of Saint Mark in Egypt. In 1951, on the death in Cairo of Abuna Kerrillos, "Abune" Basilios became the head of the Church of Ethiopia, with the full authority to nominate bishops and archbishops. During a solemn ceremony in 1959, in the presence of the Emperor, he was consecrated the first Patriarch Catholicos of the Ethiopian Orthodox Tewahedo Church by the Coptic Pope Kirillos VI at St. Mark's Cathedral in Cairo.

=== Reign as Patriarch ===
Abune Basilios was regarded as a conservative and traditionalist figure within the church, in contrast to his eventual successor Abuna Theophilos who was then Archbishop of Harar and regarded as a modernist and a reformer. Patriarch Abune Basilios regarded all innovation with deep suspicion. Abune Basilios was a deeply pious man, greatly focused on prayer and fasting, and as such left more and more of his duties to Abuna Theophilos who acted as his deputy, and later as acting Patriarch when Abune Basilios' health began to deteriorate after 1963.

Abuna Basilios was one of the few people who although very respectful of the Emperor, was not so in awe of him as to keep his true views or feelings from the Emperor. Known to always be forthright and open with the monarch, he never hesitated from telling the Emperor the truth or his own views even if he knew they might not please the Emperor. When the Patriarch believed that actions of the government or the Emperor himself were contrary to what he thought to be right, he would threaten to seclude himself at the monastery of Debre Libanos, a threat that the Emperor took seriously and which often changed the Emperor's mind. The Patriarch served on the Crown Council, and was considered among the most influential of the Emperor's advisors.

In 1960, the Imperial Guard (Kebur Zabagna) launched a coup attempt against the Emperor while he was on a state visit to Brazil. The Imperial Guard announced that the Emperor and his government were deposed, that Crown Prince Asfaw Wossen (Amha Selassie) would serve as a constitutional monarch, and that reforms would be implemented. The Imperial Army however came out in opposition to the coup as did the Imperial Air Force. The coup leaders, Brigadier General Mengistu Neway and his brother Girmame Neway sent emissaries to explain their acts to the Patriarch. Abuna Basilios refused to recognize this act and proclaimed that the Imperial Guard had no authority to depose an Emperor who had been anointed by the Church, and pronounced an anathema against those who took part or supported the coup. His statement was printed and scattered over Addis Ababa by Army helicopters. The Army and Air Force used this proclamation to rally support for the Emperor and the coup was crushed.

In order to make sure that no Imperial Army units deserted to the other side, the Patriarch had toured the barracks of the 4th Division in Addis Ababa and promised that the soldiers, who had long complained of poor pay, would receive a significant raise when the Emperor returned. Upon his return, Emperor Haile Selassie was told of the Patriarch's promise to the soldiers, but stated such a raise could not be honored at the time because there simply wasn't enough money in government coffers to do so. Angry at this, Abuna Basilios made good on previous threats and secluded himself at Debre Libanos in protest. The Emperor went personally to the monastery and persuaded the Patriarch to return to Addis Ababa, and granted a smaller raise to the soldiers to appease the Patriarch.

=== Final years ===
Abuna Basilios began to spend an increasing amount of time at the monastery of Debre Libanos after his health began to fail in the early 1960s. He left more and more of his duties to Abuna Theophilos, and spent more time resting and praying at the monastery, rarely making an appearance at the Patriarchate in Addis Ababa or at the Imperial Court. He was too frail to participate in the Conference of the Oriental Orthodox Churches held in Addis Ababa in 1965, and deputized Abuna Theophilos to represent him in most of its sessions.

Patriarch Abune Basilios, the first Patriarch and Catholicos of the Ethiopian Orthodox Tewahido Church, died on 13 October 1970.

Following a state funeral at Holy Trinity Cathedral in Addis Ababa, attended by the Emperor, the entire Imperial family, members of the Imperial Court and the government of Ethiopia, as well as the diplomatic corps and representatives of various other Churches, Abuna Basilios was buried at Debre Libanos. He was succeeded by Abuna Theophilos as Patriarch of Ethiopia.

== See also ==
- List of abunas of Ethiopia

Oriental Orthodox titles
New title	Patriarch of the Ethiopian Orthodox Tewahedo Church; 1959–1970	Succeeded by Abuna Theophilos
