= Bajo (name) =

Bajo is a surname and given name with multiple origins. Notable people with the name include:

Surname

- Darko Bajo (born 1999), Croatian basketball player
- Gyula Bajó (1907–1984), Hungarian artist
- Mahmudu Bajo (born 2004), Gambian footballer

Given name

- Bajo Pivljanin (1630–1685), Serbian hajduk commander
- Bajo Topulli (1868–1930), Albanian nationalist figure
