= Abuna Mikael I =

Abuna Mikael was an abuna or head of the Ethiopian Orthodox Church in the 12th century. According to tradition, Mikael anointed seven kings, dedicated 1,009 churches, and appointed 27,000 priests.

During this period the Abun was appointed by the Pope of Alexandria and Patriarch of All Africa, who had diocesan authority over Ethiopia and the rest of Africa, at the request of the Emperor of Ethiopia, usually after paying a substantial fee to the Muslim government for the privilege. Mikael was appointed by the Patriarch Macarius II (1103-1131), and was still in office during the tenure of Patriarch John V (1146-1167).

According to the History of the Patriarchs of Alexandria, the Emperor of Ethiopia wrote to Patriarch John in 1152, requesting a new abuna, because Mikael was too old; his request was denied. Although the name of the Emperor was not recorded, Carlo Conti Rossini identified him as Mara Takla Haymanot, arguing from this exchange that the true reason a new abuna was wanted was that Abuna Mikael had refused to acknowledge the legitimacy of the new Zagwe dynasty.
