= Endre Hevizi =

Hungarian-Brtitish artist

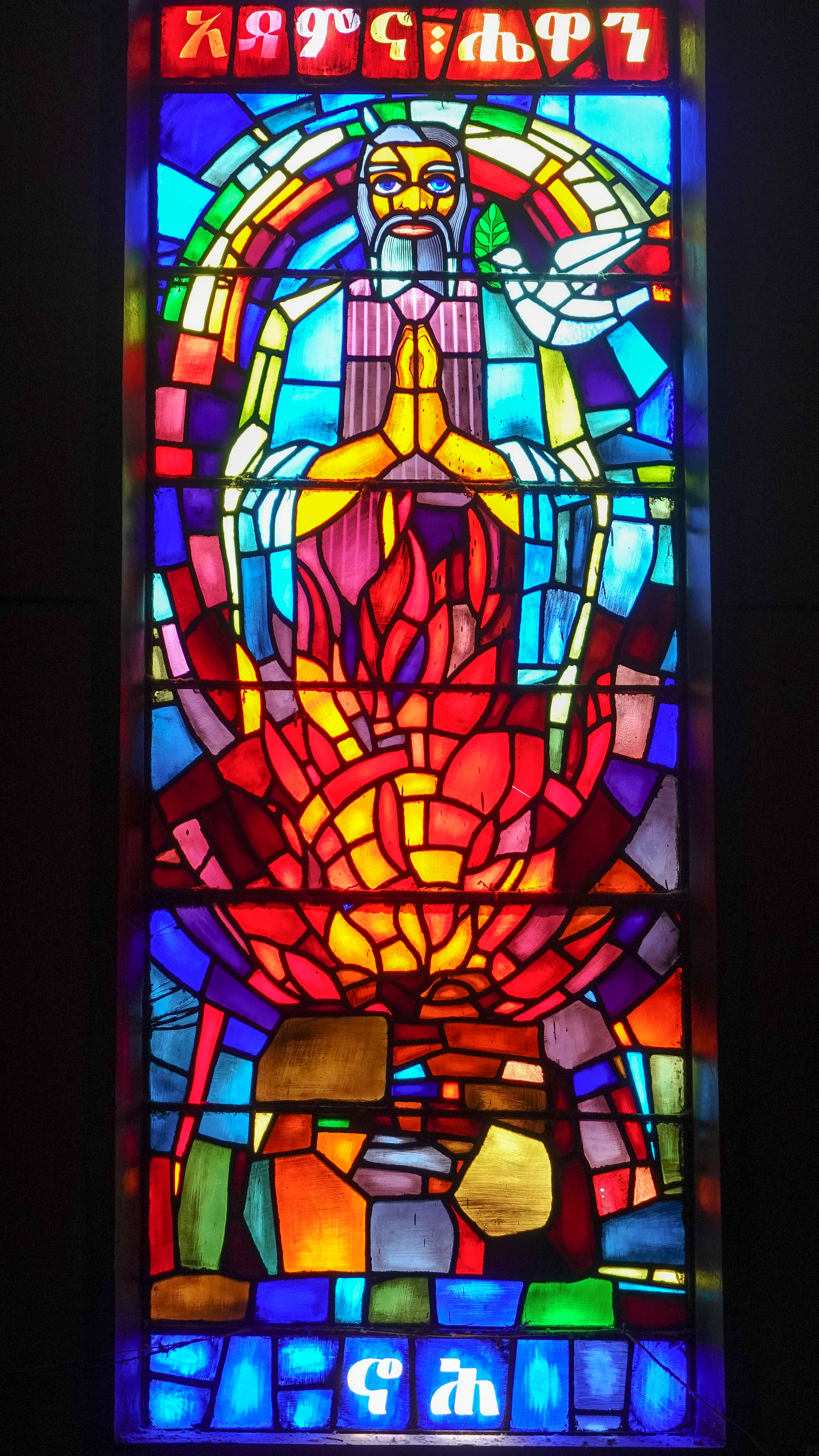
Stained-glass panel in Debre Libanos

Endre Hevizi (1923–2017) was a Hungarian artist who became a naturalised British citizen. After studying architecture in Budapest and Germany he fled to Denmark at the end of the Second World War, and lived for a while as a refugee, becoming a Post-Impressionist oil-painter, muralist, and self-taught ceramist. After marrying a Danish woman, he emigrated with her to England in 1946, and found work at Booths and Colcloughs, one of the Staffordshire Potteries. He moved to London after 1953 to work in the fields of architectural and interior design.

For a while, Hevizi was involved in decorating churches and housing estates, under contract with the Ministry of Public Building and Works and the Co-operative Wholesale Society. He also collaborated with countryman Gyula Bajó, with whom he had worked at the pottery, on a mosaic mural in Ipswich and a tourist office in London. In his other work, he produced ceramic panels on religious themes, as well as stained-glass panels and mosaics for Debre Libanos, in the Ethiopian Empire; smaller individual pieces were put on display and won him several awards. Though semi-retired during the 1990s and 2000s to care for his ailing wife, in his late life he made a comeback, contributing public art in places of significance for the Hungarians of Romania. He was inspired by the folk art of Sălaj County, and designed windows for the Hungarian Calvinist church in Zalău.

== Biography ==
Hevizi was born "Hévízi Endre" in 1923, in the city of Szeged, Kingdom of Hungary; dreaming of becoming a painter, he studied locally at the Gábor Baross Realschule (presently the István Vedres Vocational College). From 1942 he studied for a degree in architecture at the Palatine Joseph University of Technology and Economics in Budapest. Following the Soviet invasion of October 1944, the university was evacuated to Halle an der Saale in Nazi Germany, where Hevizi continued his studies and also lectured on architectural history. He was unimpressed with this appointment, noting in a 2015 interview that: "anyone who knew which end of the pencil to draw with became a teacher's assistant." At the end of the Second World War Hevizi fled by train to Denmark (paying "a hundred cigarettes" as a bribe), and found a place at a refugee camp run by the Red Cross. He began to earn money as a post-impressionist painter, earning his keep, especially after specializing in oil painting; as a result, he established a studio in Silkeborg. At the age of 22, Hevizi received a commission to decorate the interior of a new cinema. Whilst in Denmark he was married to the librarian daughter of a cantor; the wedding took place in front of an altarpiece that was also painted by Hevizi.

Before his departure from Denmark, Hevizi acquired some experience as a ceramist—as he put it: "I knew roughly what it was all about. [...] Everything I know, enamel, ceramics, painting, stained glass, I learned by myself. I went to the library, read the available books, and then I started working on it." He emigrated to England in 1946, taking his wife with him. He then found employment as a labourer at the Staffordshire pottery company of Booths and Colcloughs, working alongside fellow emigrant Gyula Bajó. Between 1947 and 1949 Hevizi exhibited paintings in Denmark and Sweden. He showed some of his artistic work to a supervisor at the pottery and was then offered a place in the design department. In 1951 he was awarded a scholarship by British Pottery Manufacturers which allowed him to travel to New York City. He also produced, with Bajó, "Bajó Ware", tableware of a modern form but decorated with historical themes including those based on Byzantine and early Christian art. Hevizi left the pottery around 1953, moving to London to work in architectural and interior design. Increasingly interested in abstract art, "he solved a number of building decoration tasks: he created church ceramic plaques, abstract wall decorations made of mosaic, bronze, glass, and ceramics."

Hevizi became a naturalised British subject in 1956. His diploma was not recognized by the Royal Institute of British Architects, though it allowed him to study for a master's degree at the University of London between 1956 and 1958. One of his professors there helped Hevizi to establish an interior decorating business; also thanks to his academic connections, he became involved in designing for churches (though, as he acknowledged in 2015, he was "not particularly religious"), and obtained commissions from the Ministry of Public Building and Works. He produced bas-relief plaques for new housing estates, many of which survive. From 1963 to 1965 he worked with Bajó on Harvest, a mosaic decorating a Co-operative Wholesale Society store in Ipswich. The mural, measuring 6 by 3 metres (19.7 ft × 9.8 ft), spans across Cox Lane and is formed of thousands of tiles. It is thought to depict Demeter, Greek goddess of harvest, and Hermes, the messenger god. It received statutory protection as a grade II listed building in 2023 and is one of four remaining Co-op murals in the country.

Hevizi also worked with Bajó to decorate the Greek State Tourist Office on Regent Street, London. The Co-operative Wholesale Society commissioned Bajó and Hevizi to complete a number of stained-glass windows and mosaics for the Debre Libanos monastery in the Ethiopian Empire, including the largest mosaics (measuring more than 600 square feet (56 m^{2})) ever made in England at that time. The mosaics included glass imported from Sweden, Italy, Greece and Turkey and were exhibited at the Royal Festival Hall in 1965. His contributions for Debre Libanos also included stained-glass panels. This required that he learn the technique "from a very clever little book", and also that he ask a friend to instruct him about the prices. In 2015, he recalled a series of meetings with Emperor Haile Selassie, who was "always asking what special reward I would take for my services. I didn't say anything, even though I should have, because they were still in debt with the last installment. In fact, a friend of mine went there recently and the tour guide said that an Ethiopian man did the work."

Hevizi also produced ceramic panels depicting the Stations of the Cross for the Catholic church at Hartley Witney, Hampshire, and 12 panels on a eucharist theme for the Allan Hall Catholic Seminary in Chelsea. His artistic works were exhibited at the Drian Galleries of Halima Nałęcz from 1969. He entered semi-retirement for 20 years to care for his wife, who was debilitated by a stroke, but continued to produce paintings and reliefs. In 1991, shortly after the end of communism in Hungary, Szeged's Móra Ferenc Múzeum could feature the first Hungarian retrospective of his work. A founder member of the British Society of Enamellers, Hevizi won prizes for vitrified enamel works at the biennales of La Crune in 1988 and Madrid in 1998. Later projects saw him involved in the cultural life of Hungarians in Romania: he designed stained-glass panels for the Rákóczi Gymnasium in Satu Mare, as designed by Imre Makovecz; the project was never completed, and Hevizi's panels went instead to the Hungarian Calvinist church in Zalău, which opened in September 2004. A widower since 2010, Hevizi travelled to Zalău to see his work completed in mid-2015, at which time he reported that he had returned to more intense work, partly inspired by the Hungarian crafts of Sălaj County, and was exhibiting it in England. He died in London in 2017.
