= The Tree of Knowledge (mural) =

1962 mural by Alan Boyson

- Mural At Former Cromwell Secondary School
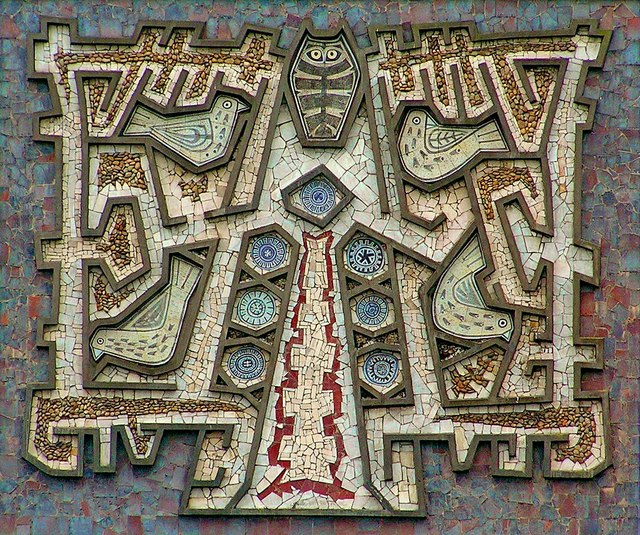
- The mural in 2007
- Artist: Alan Boyson
- Year: 1962
- Medium: concrete, porcelain tile, pebble material
- Subject: Tree; Owl; Birds

Listed Building – Grade II
- Official name: Mural at Former Cromwell Secondary School
- Designated: 19 August 2009
- Reference no.: 1393433
- Dimensions: 7 m (23 ft) × 7 m (23 ft)
- Designation: Grade II listed building
- Location: Salford, City of Salford, United Kingdom
- Coordinates: 53°29′46″N 2°16′33″W

The Tree of Knowledge is a relief mural by the artist Alan Boyson. It was created in 1962 for Cromwell Secondary School for Girls in Salford, England, and erected on an end wall on the exterior of the school building. It is made from concrete, with ceramic tiles and pebbles collected from the site for which it was designed It measures approximately 7 metres (23 ft) square. It depicts five stylised birds, one an owl, sitting in a tree.

In August 2009, when the former school building was due to be demolished, the Tiles and Architectural Ceramics Society, The Salford Star (a local magazine), and local residents campaigned successfully to have the mural given statutory protection by being "listed" by the Department for Culture, Media and Sport. The notice granting it Grade II listed status said:

It has a high level of aesthetic and artistic quality represented in a bold and striking composition

The rest of the building was subsequently demolished, leaving only the wall on which the mural sits, plus enough of the side walls to support it.

Boyson also made a ceramic tiled wall, since lost, for the school's entrance hall. The combined commission was worth £400 (equivalent to £7,470 in 2025).

In 2021, planning permission was submitted for the construction of 21 houses and 24 apartments on the site with the plan to retain the mural.
