= Gabriel Abdel El-Metgaly =

Abuna Gabriel Abdel El-Metgaly

Martyr, Priest (Hegumen)
- Born: 30 March 1918; Mallawi, Minya
- Died: 3 September 1978; Minya, Egypt
- Venerated in: Coptic Orthodox church
- Major shrine: Church of the Archangel Gabriel, Minya, Egypt
- Feast: September 3 Mesori 29

Abuna Gabriel Abdel El-Metgaly (30 March 1918 – 3 September 1978) was an Egyptian hegumen of the Coptic Orthodox Church.

== Early life ==
El-Metgaly was born in the village of Tend, Mallawi. He completed his secondary in 1936. He joined the Coptic Orthodox Church Clerical Council in 1937 and studied there until 1941.

== Death and legacy ==
Due to the sectarian strife of 1978, a group of Muslims attacked the priest's house. He and his wife were beaten with sticks and sharp instruments. El-Metgaly died from the attack.

In 2018, his body was transferred to the Church of the Archangel Gabriel in Minya. It was said that his body had not decomposed.
