= Co-op Mosaic =

Mosaic in Kingston upon Hull, East Riding of Yorkshire, England

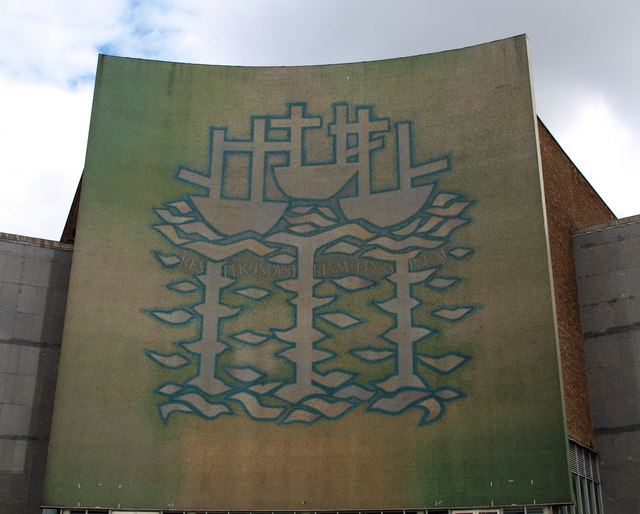
- The mural in 2008
- Artist: Alan Boyson
- Year: 1963
- Medium: Glass
- Subject: Fishing trawlers
- Location: Kingston upon Hull; 53.744968°N 0.339885°W

Listed Building – Grade II
- Official name: Three Ships Mural
- Designated: 21 November 2019
- Reference no.: 1468073

The Co-op Mosaic is a mural in Kingston upon Hull, England, designed by the artist Alan Boyson. Commissioned by the Hull and East Riding Co-operative Society for the exterior of the end of their new store, the mural is sited at the junction of Jameson Street and King Edward Street, now a mainly pedestrianised area created for the City of Culture 2017. The building was erected by 1963. Depicting three stylised trawlers, it commemorates Hull's fishing fleet.

The mural is made from 4,224 panels, each 1 foot (30 cm) square and each containing 225 tesserae – cubes of Italian glass – using 1,061,775 in all. The panels are fixed to a 66 by 64 feet (20 by 20 m) curved concrete screen attached to the wall.

The mural was manufactured to Boyson's design by Richards Tiles Ltd, subsequently part of Johnsons Tiles Ltd. It was constructed by A. Andrews & Sons Marbles and Tiles.

Included in the mural is the Latin text res per industriam prosperae ('prosperity through industry'). It also includes the letters "H U L L" in the ships' masts. These appear fortuitously and not through deliberate design.

After the Co-operative Society vacated the building in 1969, it was occupied by BHS from 1970 to 2016.

In May 2007 the mural was locally listed by Hull City Council, who described it as a "superb example of modern public art". The council subsequently pledged to retain the mural when the site is developed. In November 2016 a proposal by Hull Civic Society to give the mural statutory protection at a national level was rejected. The society announced its intention to appeal against the decision.

In 2017, the Twentieth Century Society added the mosaic to its Risk List of architecture at risk of being lost. The mural was placed on the National Heritage List for England on 21 November 2019 at Grade II.

== Fish mural ==
An additional mural by Boyson, inside the store on the fourth floor, was rediscovered during refurbishment in 2011. Depicting a shoal of fish, it is more than 22 feet (6.7 m) long and is made from ceramic tiles, marble and stone. Located outside the former Skyline Ballroom (later Romeo and Juliet's nightclub), it had been hidden behind a false wall. The building's then owners, Manor Property Group, announced plans to feature it in their designs for the building's decor. It was made as part of the same commission as the exterior mural.

== See also ==
- Manor Property Group
- Listed buildings in Kingston upon Hull (Myton Ward)
