= Abuna Yohannes =

Abuna Yohannes was an Abuna, or head of the Ethiopian Orthodox Church in the 14th century, during the reign of Emperor Amda Seyon. He was accused of simony by a group of Ethiopian clergy at the Royal Court.

During this period the Abun was appointed by the Pope of Alexandria and Patriarch of All Africa, who had diocesan authority over Ethiopia and the rest of Africa, at the request of the Emperor of Ethiopia, usually after paying a substantial fee to the Muslim government for the privilege.

His existence is attested in a grant of land by Emperor Amda Seyon recorded in a copy of the Gospels transcribed at Istifanos Monastery in Lake Hayq, now at the National Library in Addis Ababa. Because another Abun is mentioned in a Compendium of Homilies dated to 1339/1340 from the same monastery, Yaqob, Abuna Yohannes would have held this office in the first decades of the 14th century.
