= Eliya Abuna =

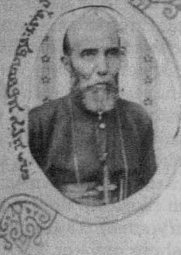
Eliya Abuna, ca. 1920

Mar Eliya Abuna of Alqosh (1862–1955 in Kirkuk) was a bishop of the Assyrian Church of the East and Chaldean Catholic Church.

== Life ==
Gewargis d'Beth Abuna came, as the last name says, from the house in which up to the first generation after unification of the "Patriarchate of the plains" with the Pope in Rome, the charge of Catholicos-Patriarch of the Chaldean Church based in Alqosh had been. He was educated at the Chaldean Catholic seminary in Mosul, and in 1887 or 1888 was ordained a priest in the Chaldean Catholic Church. Thereafter, he worked in various places in rural Alqosh and in 1908 returned to the urban community of Assyrian Catholics.

On May 2, 1909, he was consecrated in Qudshanis as Metropolitan of Alqosh, by Catholicos Patriarch Mar Shimun XIX and given the name Mar Eliya (Elijah). He was unable to establish a diocese and so returned to Qudshanis. In 1912, Mar Shimun XIX entrusted him with the Diocese of Taimar, in the area around Van, in what is today's southeastern Turkey. There, in January 1916, he joined as a companion of the Catholicos-Patriarch in his negotiations with the Russians, and then apparently was one of those subjected to the expulsion of the Assyrian mountain tribes in the Assyrian genocide. After the killing of Shimun XIX, Mar Eliya directed the burial of the Patriarch on 6 March 1918 in the cemetery of the Armenian Church of Khosroabad (Khosrova) and was one of the Co-consecrators of Mar Polos Shimun XX on 14 April 1918 in Urmia. In October 1920, he signed the letter of appointment of Mar Abimalek Timothy from India as Regent to the young Catholicos-Patriarch Mar Shimun XX.

The following year, in 1924, he left the Assyrian Church of the East and returned to the Chaldean Catholic Church, where he was appointed Patriarchal Vicar for the diocese Aqra; this service took less than two years. He spent the following three decades in Alqosh and elsewhere with his relatives until his repose in 1955.

== Works ==
Eliya Abuna authored several works, most of them unpublished during his lifetime: a history of the Eastern Patriarchs in two volumes, first in modern Syriac language, and the second in Classical Syriac (Harvard College Library, Library Houghton Syriac MS 182 and 183). He also wrote an astronomical treatise in Arabic (Houghton Arabic Library MS 394). The historic church will now work through Hermis Aboona has been published.

== Sources ==
- Coakley, James F. (1996). "The Church of the East since 1914". The Bulletin of the John Rylands Library. 78 (3): 179–198. doi:10.7227/BJRL.78.3.14. Archived from the original on 2021-03-07.
- Coakley, James F. (1999). "The Patriarchal List of the Church of the East". After Bardaisan: Studies on Continuity and Change in Syriac Christianity. Louvain: Peeters Publishers. pp. 65–84. ISBN 9789042907355.
- Coakley, James F. (2001). "Mar Elia Aboona and the History of the East Syrian Patriarchate". Oriens Christianus. 85: 119–138.
- Fiey, Jean Maurice (1993). Pour un Oriens Christianus Novus: Répertoire des diocèses syriaques orientaux et occidentaux. Beirut: Orient-Institut. ISBN 9783515057189.
