= Abuna Abraham =

Head (abuna) of the Ethiopian Orthodox Tewahedo Church from 1937 to 1939

- Abuna of Ethiopia
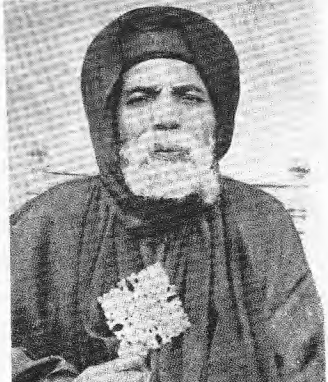
- Abuna Abraham
- Church: Ethiopian Orthodox Tewahedo Church
- Elected: 27 November 1937
- In office: 1937–1939
- Predecessor: Qerellos IV
- Successor: Yohannes XV

Personal details
- Denomination: Oriental Orthodoxy

Abuna Abraham was a cleric of the Ethiopian Orthodox Tewahedo Church, who was installed as the archbishop of the Ethiopian church during the Fascist Italian occupation following the Second Italo-Ethiopian War, in place of the legitimate Archbishop Abuna Qerellos IV.

On 27 November 1937, Marshal Rodolfo Graziani convened an assembly of Ethiopian clergymen to elect a new archbishop. Abuna Abraham, bishop of Gojjam, was elected. On 28 December 1937, the Holy Synod of the Coptic Orthodox Church of Alexandria under Pope John XIX declared the election illegitimate and excommunicated the new archbishop.

Ignoring the interdiction of the Holy Synod and the Pope, Abuna Abraham and his successor Abuna Yohannes XV (1939–1945) designated eleven bishops in order to constitute a full ecclesiastical hierarchy before the Italian occupation ended in 1941.

Oriental Orthodox titles
Preceded by Qerellos IV	Abuna of Ethiopia; 1937–1939	Succeeded by Yohannes XV
