= Abuna Salama II =

Head of the Ethiopian Orthodox Tewahedo Church from 1348 to 1388

Salama II was Abuna, or head of the Ethiopian Orthodox Church from 1348 to 1388. During his tenure a number of translations into the Ge'ez language appeared, which has resulted with him being remembered as "Abba Salama, the Translator."

Edward Ullendorff discusses his entry in the Ethiopian Synaxarium for 21 Nahase, which states, "By your lips sweeter than the scent of myrrh and aloe/Have the Scriptures been translated from Arabic into Ge'ez." Although this Salama could be identified with Frumentius, who converted Ethiopia to Christianity, Ullendorff shows that this entry refers to this Abuna, who is associated with "a revision of the existing Bible translations". Taddesse Tamrat notes that "from the great number of translations attributed to him, Salama was no doubt the greatest Egyptian bishop Ethiopia ever had" as well as pointing out he "was on very good terms with even the most militant monastic leaders of Ethiopia at the time."

A land grant in Arabic to Istifanos Monastery dated Bashans 7, 1091 Year of the Martyrs (= 3 May AD 1375) was likely the work of Abuna Salama. Taddesse Tamrat considers this "additional confirmation for the great influence and prestige which Abuna Salama enjoyed in the country at the time."
