= Manor Property Group =

Property development organisation

Manor Property Group is a company incorporated in 1938 (No. 00341621) as a property developer based in the East Riding of Yorkshire that own a number of prominent sites in Kingston upon Hull and across the U.K. It is not to be confused with Manor Property Limited (09590680) which is a separate, independent business in real estate. In 2014, there were a total of 32 registered businesses at their address. In 2016, the company purported to have been operating for over thirty years, with a development value of its portfolio in excess of £850 million. Manor Property Group have established and dissolved many operating companies, related to various property developments, as is regular practice in U.K. property development.

== History ==
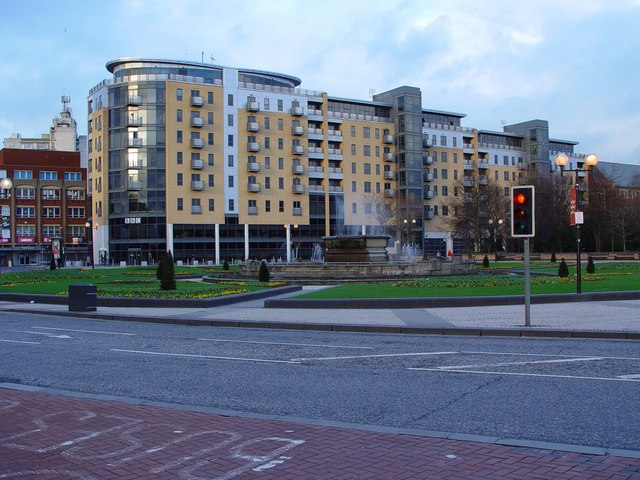
BBC Yorkshire and Lincolnshire studios in Hull

The company has been linked to a number of stalled developments in Kingston upon Hull relating to prominent buildings that have been long-term derelict. These include the former Co-operative department store building (which was later home to British Home Stores, although 75 per cent of the building remained unoccupied during this time) in Bond Street, the former Heaven and Hell nightclub in Anne Street, the former Lord Line trawler company offices at St Andrew's Dock, west of the city, and the former Rank Hovis Mill (also known as the Clarence Flour Mills) in St Peter Street. Despite ambitious schemes being proposed by the company to redevelop all of the aforementioned sites, very little work has been carried out to date. In December 2012, it was reported that the company owned a number of empty landmark buildings in the city which have yet to be developed.

Manor successfully built the BBC's Yorkshire and Lincolnshire television and radio studios. This was following the corporation's 'Project Hull' announcement in October 2001, which would see them invest and eventually become established in the city. The new studio complex was unveiled by Manor Property Group at Queen's Court in Queen's Gardens, Hull in 2005, which is now home to the BBC's local news and radio service Look North and Radio Humberside respectively.

In April 2017, it was announced that the former Chief Executive of Hull College, Gary Warke MBE, was now the Group Education Director. Warke had resigned from his position at the college in March 2017, following revelations highlighting grave financial problems within Hull College Group.

== Criticism ==
Plans for a £76 million eight storey 676-bed student accommodation development were produced by the company to be based in Hulme, Manchester, but the scheme was refused planning permission in January 2013. The company had purchased the brownfield site on Coupland Street for £36 million in 2010 and had aimed on spending £40 million on its development. An appeals hearing was scheduled to discuss the matter in January 2015, however director of the company Philip Akrill had failed to attend this and he was ultimately described as 'acting irresponsibly' by the planning inspector.
