= Abuna Qerellos IV =

Ethiopian Orthodox archbishop (1880–1950)

- Abuna of Ethiopia
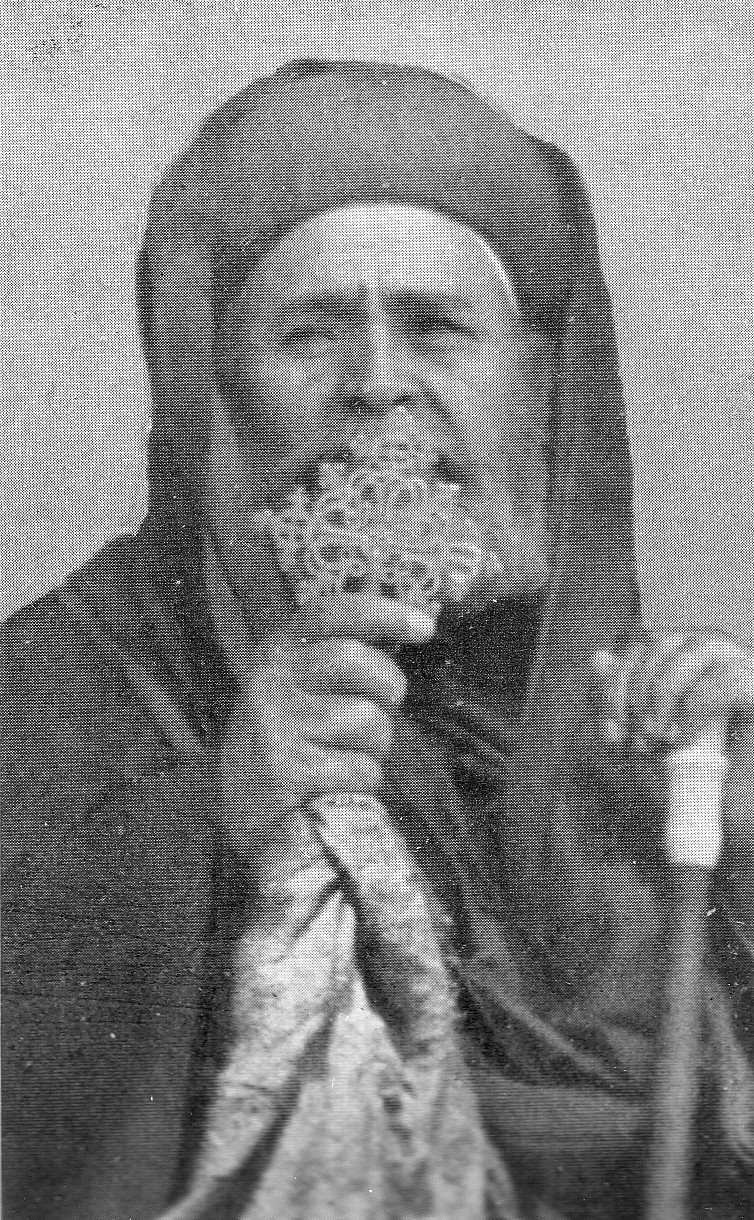
- Abuna Qerellos IV
- Church: Ethiopian Orthodox Tewahedo Church
- In office: 1926–1936; 1945–1950
- Predecessor: Mattheos X Yohannes XV
- Successor: Abraham; Basilios

Personal details
- Born: Sidarus al-Antuni c. 1880 Khedivate of Egypt
- Died: 1950 Ethiopian Empire
- Denomination: Oriental Orthodoxy

Abuna Qerellos IV (baptised as Sidarus al-Antuni; c. 1880 – 1950) was a Coptic priest from Egypt, who came to Ethiopia in 1926, becoming the Archbishop of Ethiopian Orthodox Tewahedo Church. Except for a break between 1936 and 1945 (including the Fascist Italian occupation between 1936 and 1941, following the Second Italo-Ethiopian War) which he spent in exile, Qerellos remained the head of the Ethiopian church until his death.

Qerellos was the last Archbishop of Ethiopia of foreign descent.

Oriental Orthodox titles
Preceded by Mattheos X	Abuna of Ethiopia; 1926–1936	Succeeded by Abraham
Preceded by Yohannes XV	Abuna of Ethiopia; 1945–1950	Succeeded by Basilios
