= Ethiopian ecclesiastical titles =

List of offices of the Ethiopian Orthodox Tewahedo Church

Ethiopian ecclesiastical titles refers to the offices of the Ethiopian Orthodox Tewahedo Church, a hierarchical organization. Some of the more important offices are unique to it.

== Titles ==
Ethiopian ecclesiastical titles include:

- Patriarch we Re'ese Liqane Papasat — Patriarch and First of the Archbishop, meaning Catholicos. Since 1959, the title of the head of the Ethiopian Orthodox Church is Patriarch Catholicos of Ethiopia. The first Patriarch, Abuna Basilios was enthroned by the Coptic Orthodox Pope Cyril VI in 1959, and so the Patriarchs of Ethiopia are part of the Apostolic succession of the Holy See of St. Mark. The Ethiopian Patriarchate combined the old offices of Abuna and Ichege (see below). In 2001, the title of Archbishop of Axum was added to the titles of the Patriarch after Axum was elevated to the rank of an Archdiocese by the Holy Synod.
- Abuna — Metropolitan Archbishop of the Ethiopian Orthodox Church. From the 4th century until the middle of the 20th century he was a Coptic Metropolitan appointed by the Coptic Orthodox Pope of Alexandria and Patriarch of All Africa to serve as its leader. However, as time passed, the authority of the Abuna was reduced to little more than a figurehead largely because the incumbents spoke little Ge'ez or Amharic. In 1948, the Coptic Orthodox Pope Joseph II under request from Emperor Haile Selassie, appointed the then Ichege (see below) as the first Ethiopian born Archbishop, Abuna Basilios, and granted the Ethiopian church autocephaly. His successor as Coptic Orthodox Pope, Cyril VI, elevated Abune Basilios to the exalted rank of Patriarch in 1959. The title of Abuna is now held by all the numerous Archbishops and Bishops of the Ethiopian Orthodox Church.
- Nebure-Id — ("Laying of hands.") -- the High Priest or Supreme Pontiff of Ethiopia, was responsible for ordaining and anointing others through the ceremonial act of "laying hands on them." This same ritual was employed during his own ordination and anointment, with a delegation of electors from the Three Houses of the Kingdom participating in the symbolic act of "laying hands on him."
- Ichege — the abbot of the monastery of Debre Libanos, who served as the second highest ecclesiastic of the Ethiopian church, and was often the de facto head of that church. Margary Perham describes the position as comparable to a Vicar-General. Beginning in the mid-17th century, the Ichege lived at Gondar while the capital was in that city. The Ichege followed the capital when it moved to Debre Tabor, Mekele and ultimately Addis Ababa.
- Sebate — Administrator of the Debre Libanos Monastery and deputy to the Ichege.
- Aqabe Sa'at ("Guardian of the Church hours") -- Chaplain to the Emperor, who served as the third highest ecclesiastic. In earlier times, this office was held by the head of the abbots of Istifanos Monastery in Lake Hayq; the earliest recorded abbot of Istifanos to also serve as aqabe sa'at was Za-Iyasus during the reign of Amda Seyon I. This office is extinct.
- Qomos — Canon, who has a role in the creation of tabots.
- Lique Siltanat' — "Arch-hierarch" title originally granted only to the Dean of Holy Trinity Cathedral in Addis Ababa, but today is granted to the deans of most of Ethiopia's cathedrals.
- Lique Liqawint — "Arch-scholar", head of all clergy in a province. This title was granted to the Dean and Abbot of the Ba'eta Le Mariam Monastery, the mausoleum church on the grounds of Addis Ababa's Imperial Palace, where Emperor Menelik II and Empress Zewditu are buried.
- Qess-Priest. Leader of the Mass
- Lique Diaqon — Archdeacon.
- Diaqon — Deacon. In Ethiopian Christianity three deacons and two priests are required to correctly celebrate Mass.

== See also ==
- Aleqa
- Ethiopian aristocratic and court titles
