= Alan Boyson =

English muralist of post-war public art 1930 - 2018

Alan Boyson RCA
- Born: 1930; Marple, Stockport, England, UK
- Died: 19 August 2018 (aged 87–88)
- Education: Manchester Regional School of Art (1950–1954); Royal College of Art (1954–1957)
- Occupations: Lecturer in art; Artist; muralist; public art
- Employer: Wolverhampton College of Art (c. 1959–60)

Alan Boyson, RCA (1930 – 19 August 2018) was an English muralist and sculptor, who worked chiefly in glass, ceramic and concrete.

Boyson studied at Manchester Regional School of Art from 1950 to 1954, and at the Royal College of Art from 1954 to 1957. He was subsequently a lecturer at the School of Ceramics in Wolverhampton College of Art, during which time he established his own studio and began taking commissions.

An Associate of the Royal College of Art, Boyson worked until c. 2004. As well as public works, he also made smaller pieces.

When his mural The Tree of Knowledge, at the former Cromwell Secondary School in Salford, was given statutory protection by English Heritage, they said:

It has a high level of aesthetic and artistic quality represented in a bold and striking composition

Boyson's Hull murals are the subject of an arts and film project titled Ships in the Sky by Hull filmmaker Esther Johnson, working with Untold Hull at Hull Central Libraries. The project invites the public to contribute memories and memorabilia related to the Hull Coop building and Boyson's murals. The project has been written about by House of Mirelle and in Tribune Magazine.

== Works ==
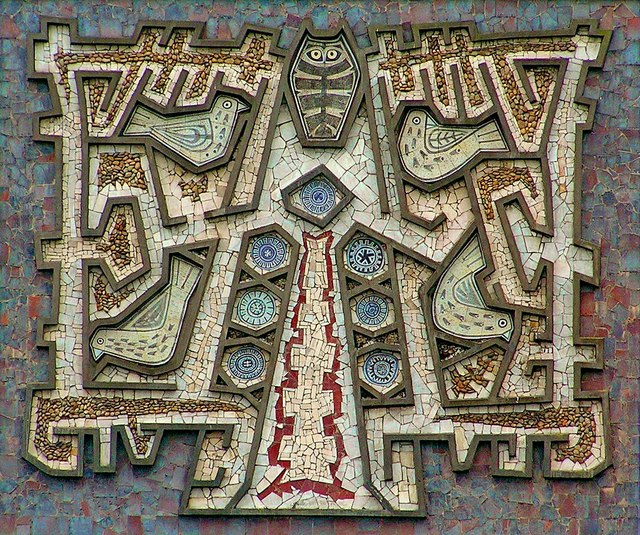
The Tree of Knowledge

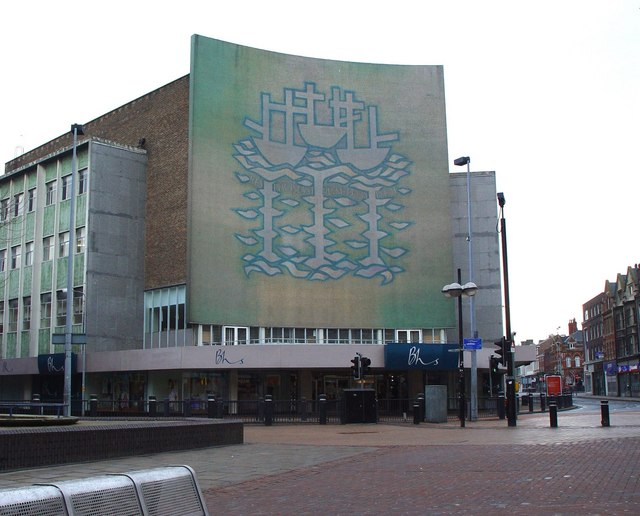
Three Ships mural mosaic

Boyson's works include:

- decorative features and font, The Church of the Epiphany and St John, Corby (1960–1961)
- The Tree of Knowledge, Salford (1962; Grade II listed in 2009)
  - a ceramic tiled wall for the entrance hall of the same building (since lost)
- Three Ships mural mosaic (1963; locally listed; Grade II listed 2019) on the former Hull and East Riding Society Cooperative Store (and later a BHS), in Kingston upon Hull. The 66 ft by 64 ft (20m x 19.5m) glass mosaic mural is on the exterior of the building (with two further murals inside). In 2019 there was an online petition to get this mural Grade II listed by Historic England. Grade II listing was announced in November 2019.
- Fish mural (1961) inside the former Hull and East Riding Society Cooperative Store (later a BHS), in Kingston upon Hull. This mural was made for the corridor outside the Skyline Ballroom on the fourth floor of the building. The mural depicts a shoal of fish and was rediscovered in 2011 by Christopher Marsden, a leading authority on Boyson
- Geometric sponge-print tile mural inside the former Hull and East Riding Society Cooperative Store (later a BHS), in Kingston upon Hull. This mural was discovered in 2018 as a result of production for Ships in the Sky
- concrete screens, City Arcade, Lichfield (1963; lost)
- glass-tile mural, Parkfields Cedars Grammar School (now Price Charles Avenue campus of Derby College), Derby (1969; now hidden behind partition wall)
- glass screen and decorative ceiling, Halifax Building Society headquarters, Halifax (1970s)
- stainless steel sculpture, NatWest Tower, London (late 1970s)
- abstract stained-glass window, St Ann's Church, central Manchester (church is Grade II listed)
- mural, Co-operative Insurance Society Building, Manchester (building is Grade II listed)
- ceramic memorial, Birmingham Oratory (restored 2010)
- pyramids, Concourse Shopping centre, Skelmersdale (lost)
- mural, Queen's Hotel, Collyhurst
- sculptured aluminium banking hall ceiling, Bank House (Bank of England), Leeds (since removed)
- concrete frieze, Merseyway Shopping Centre, Stockport
- fourteen ceramic Stations of the Cross and three holy water stoops, St Raphael's Church, Huddersfield Road, Millbrook, Stalybridge, Manchester (grade II listed; closed 2011)
- tiles, George Cusick's greengrocery store (now in different ownership), Ashton Road, Denton, Manchester
- concrete screen at Pendleton (now Salford) College
- untitled mural, register office (former), Cygnet House, Gravesend, Kent
- mosaic, Wombwell School for Girls, Gravesend (missing)
- fibreglass sculpture, shopping centre Swinton, Greater Manchester (lost)
- designs (unused) for reliefs at Spring Gardens Post Office, Manchester
