= Hirmis Aboona =

Assyrian historian

Hirmis Aboona ܗܪܡܙܕ ܐܒܘܢܐ
- Born: 1940; Alqosh, Iraq
- Died: 27 April 2009 (aged 69); Toronto, Canada
- Occupation: Historian
- Known for: Writing The Assyrian After the Fall of Nineveh

Hirmis Aboona (c.1940 – 27 April 2009) was an Assyrian historian who was known for his publications concerning the history of the Assyrians in northern Iraq.

== Biography ==
Hirmis Aboona was born in 1940 in Alqosh to Mushe Aboona and Meryam Asmar. After finishing his elementary school in his home town, his family moved to Baghdad in 1952, there he graduated from the law faculty at the University of Baghdad in 1963. He worked at a number of governmental institutions in Baghdad and married Nani Isa Rashshoo where they had 4 children together. He moved with his family to London in 1982 where he pursued higher education at the University of Exeter obtaining his history Ph.D. for his thesis The Assyrian independent tribes in Tyari and Hakkari and their relationship with the Kurds and Turks.

In 1988 Aboona and his family emigrated to Toronto, Canada where he resided until his death due to a heart attack on 27 April 2009.

== Works ==
Hirmis Aboona dedicated a number of years writing his Book of 12 volumes The Assyrian After the Fall of Nineveh. He also participated in a number of Assyrian conferences in North America, Europe and Australia. He also lectured at a number of universities, including the University of Sydney, University of Cambridge, as well as various universities in Syria and Lebanon.

=== The Assyrians After the Fall of Nineveh ===
His most renowned work covers the political and religious history of the Assyrian people from the Fall of Nineveh in 612 BC until the beginning of the 21st century. The book is written in 12 volumes some of which are not published. These volumes are:

I. From the Fall of Nineveh to the Arrival of Christianity
II. The Assyrians and Christianity
III. The Assyrians During the Arab Islamic Rule
IV. Part 1 – The Assyrians Under the Mongol Rule

Part 2 – The History of the Kurdish Settlement in Assyria

V. Independent Assyrian Tribes in Tiyare and Hakkari and the Surrounding Assyrian Regions
VI. The Massacres of Bedr Khan Beg in Tiyare and Hakkari 1843–1846
VII. Persecution of the Assyrians, Chaldeans and Syriacs in the 19th Century
VIII. Uncovered Pages in the History of the Chaldean Church
IX. Assyrians Before and After WWI
X. Assyrians and the Mosul Problem
XI. Assyrians, Chaldeans and Syriacs, "One Nation with Multiple Names"
XII. Assyrians and the Contemporary Political Movement
