= Debre Libanos =

Monastery in Ethiopia

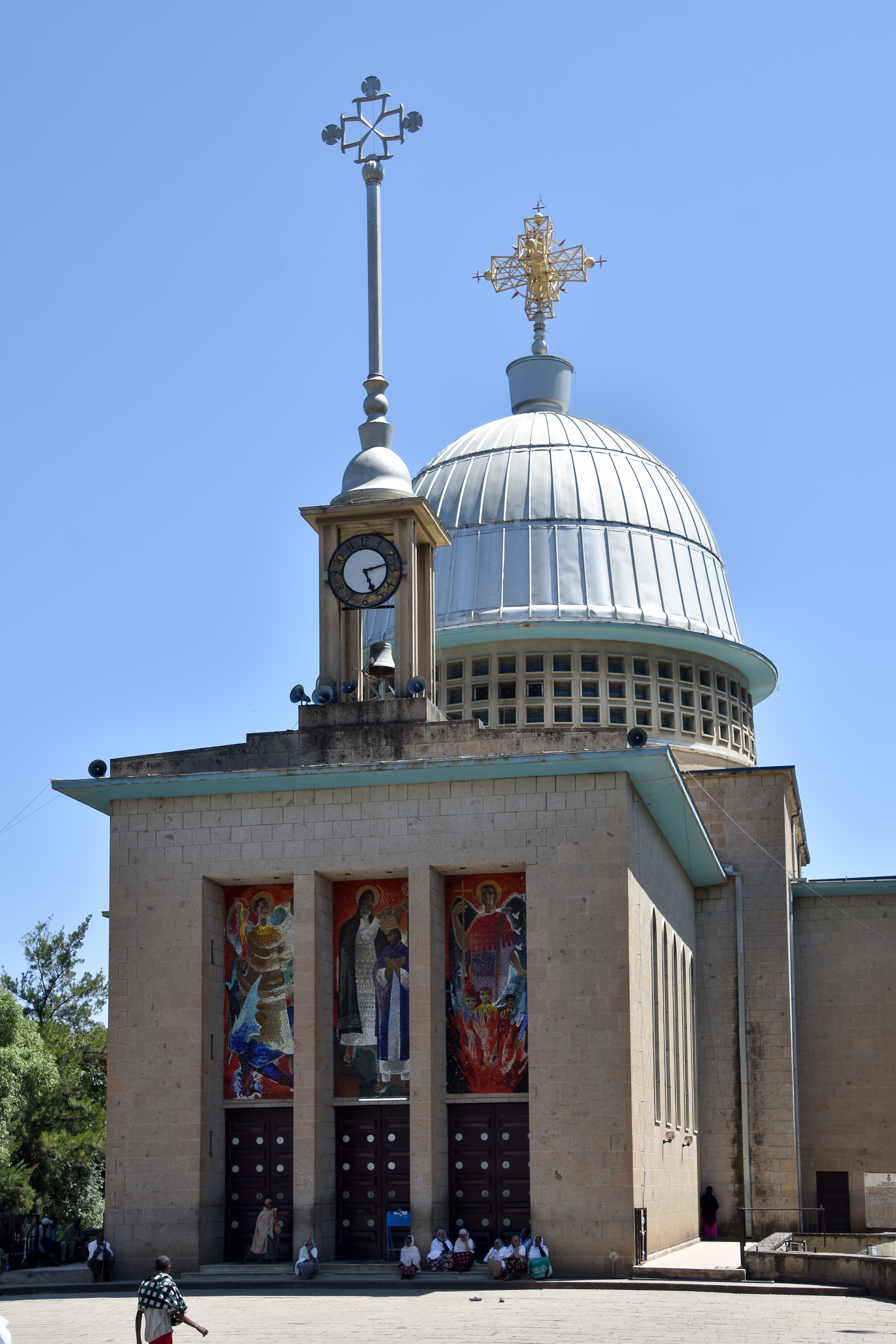
- The facade of church

- Location within Ethiopia

Monastery information
- Established: 1284
- Dedication: Life and death of Saint Tekle Haymanot
- Diocese: North Shewa

People
- Founder: Tekle Haymanot
- Important associated figures: Yekuno Amlak; Yeshaq I; Haile Selassie

Architecture
- Style: Medieval Ethiopian architecture

Site
- Location: North Shewa Zone, Oromia Region
- Country: Ethiopia
- Coordinates: 9.711890°N 38.847343°E
- Public access: Yes

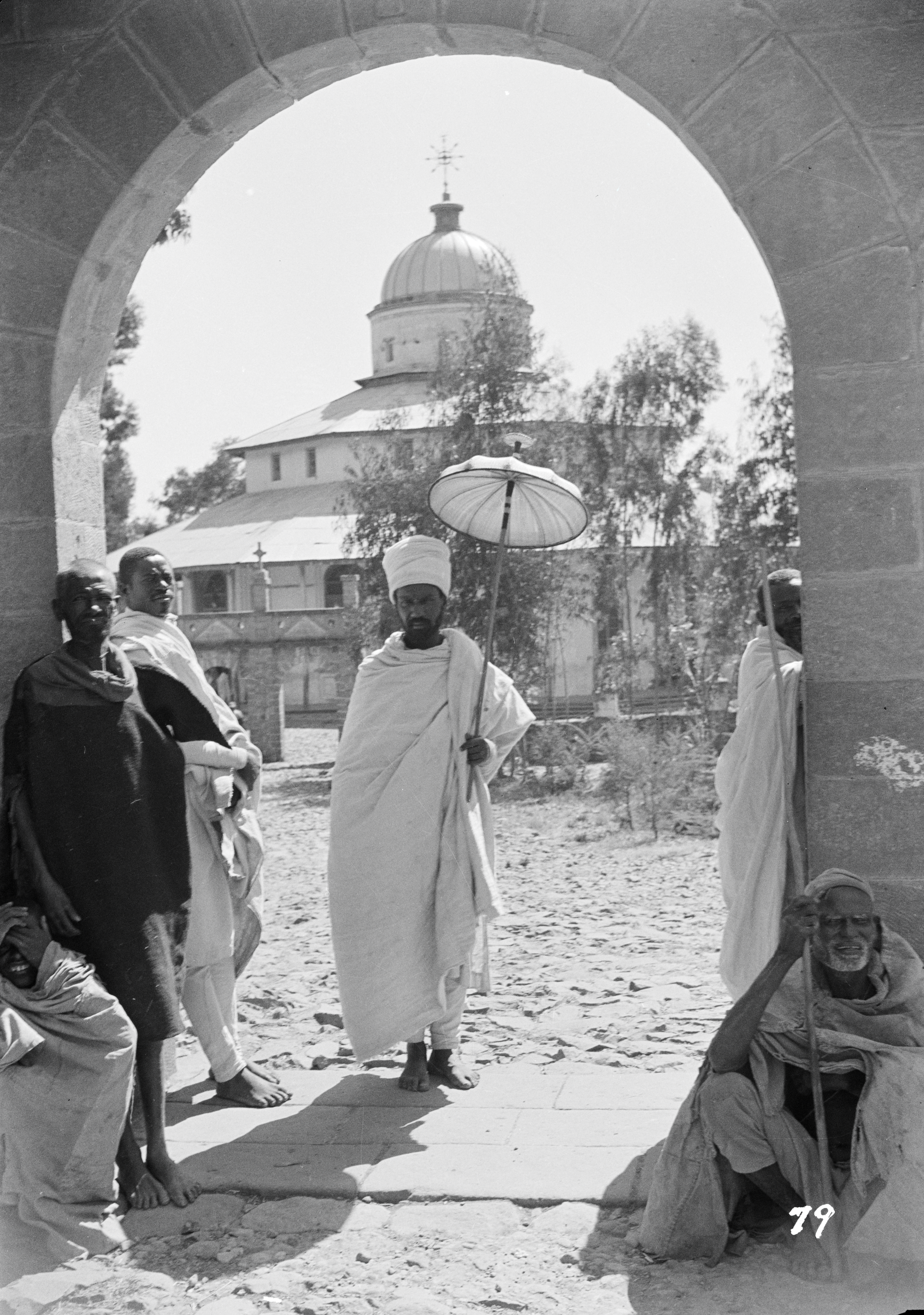
Debre Libanos in 1934

Debre Libanos (Amharic: ደብረ ሊባኖስ) is an Ethiopian Orthodox Tewahedo monastery, lying northwest of Addis Ababa in the North Shewa Zone of the Oromia Region. It was founded in 1284 by Saint Tekle Haymanot as Debre Atsbo and was renamed as Debre Libanos in the 15th century. He prayed in a cave above the current monastery for 29 years. The monastery's chief abbot, called the Ichege, was the second most powerful official in the Ethiopian Church after the Abuna.

The monastery complex sits on a terrace between a cliff and the gorge of one of the tributaries of the Abbay River (the Blue Nile). None of the original buildings of Debre Libanos survive, although David Buxton suspected "there are interesting things still to be found among the neighbouring cliffs". Current buildings include the church over Tekle Haymanot's tomb, which Emperor Haile Selassie ordered constructed in 1961; a slightly older Church of the Cross, where Buxton was told a fragment of the True Cross is preserved; and five religious schools. The cave where the saint lived is in the nearby cliffs, which one travel guide describes as a five-minute walk away. This cave contains a spring, whose water is considered holy and is the object of pilgrimages.

== History ==
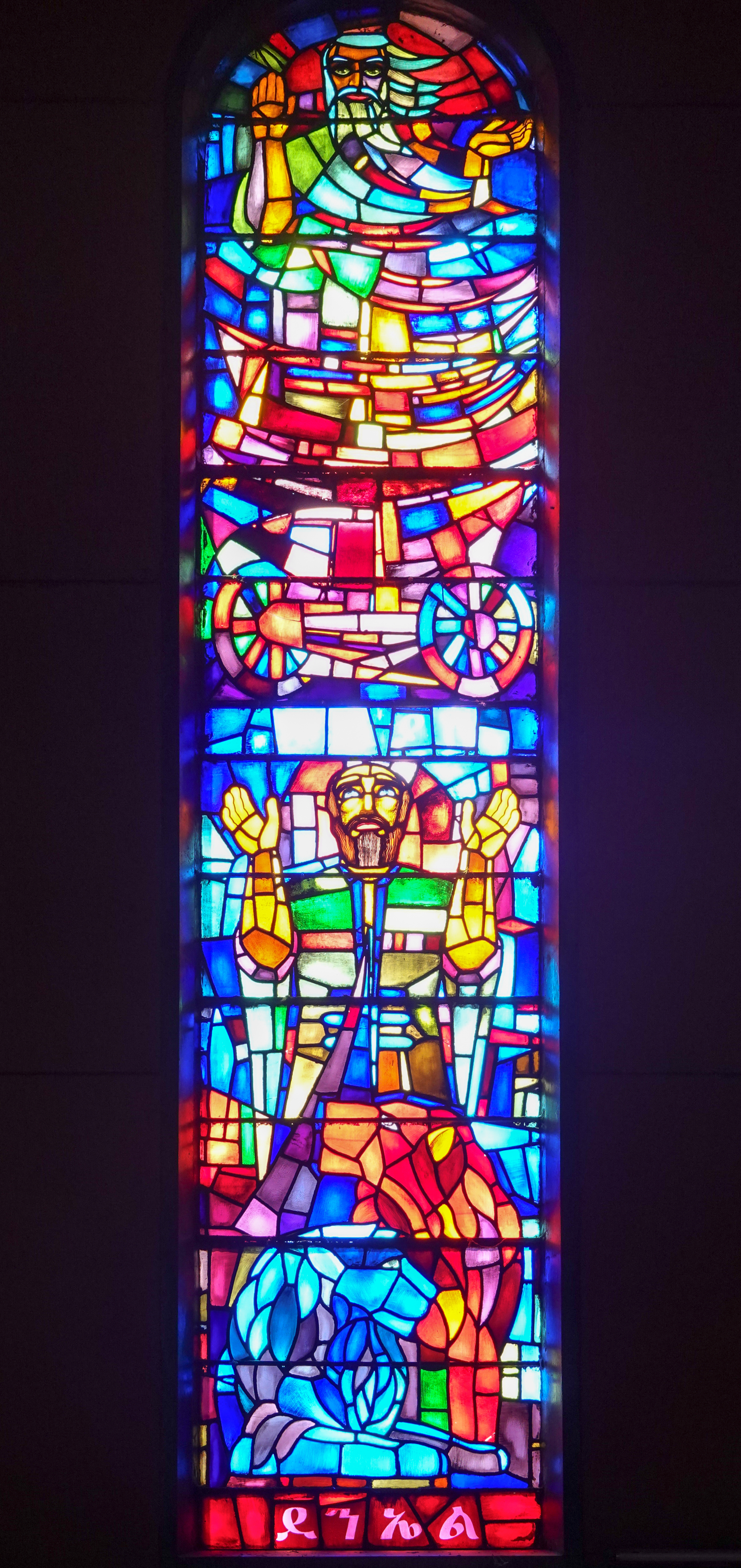
Stained-glass window by E.O. Hevezi and G.J. Bajo, c. 1965

Tekle Haymanot left his homeland of Shewa for Debre Damo prior to the monastery's founding. On his return, he introduced the spirit of renewal that Christianity was experiencing in the northern provinces. He settled in the central area between Selale and Grarya, where he founded in 1284 the monastery of Debre Atsbo, which would be renamed in the 15th century to Debre Libanos. It then became one of the most important religious institutions of Ethiopia, not only founding a number of daughter houses, but its abbot became one of the principal leaders of the Ethiopian Church, called the Echege, second only to the Abuna. Margary Perham describes the position as comparable to a Vicar-General. The Sebate was administrator of Debre Libanos and deputy to the Ichege

Debre Libanos suffered great destruction during the invasion of Ahmad ibn Ibrahim al-Ghazi when one of his followers, Ura'i Abu Bakr, set it on fire 21 July 1531, despite the attempts of its community to ransom the church. Although the Ichege intervened to protect the Gambo people during the reign of Sarsa Dengel, the buildings were not completely rebuilt until after the visit of Emperor Iyasu the Great in 1699.

In the reign of Emperor Fasilides, after invading Oromos had ravaged the monastery's lands in Shewa the Emperor granted the Ichege his palace at Azazo, where the various Ichege lived. From the 17th century until the matter was resolved in a synod convened by Emperor Yohannes II, the Ichege and the monks of Debre Libanos were the most important supporters of the Sost Lidet doctrine, in opposition to the House of Ewostatewos. Beginning in the mid-17th century, the Ichege lived at Gondar while the capital was in that city. The Ichege followed the capital when it moved to Debre Tabor, Mekele and ultimately Addis Ababa.

Emperor Haile Selassie's interest in Debre Libanos dates to when he was governor of the district of Selale. The Emperor notes in his autobiography that during the reconstruction of the church at Debre Libanos, an inscribed gold ring was found in the excavations, which he personally delivered to then Emperor Menelik II. The reconstructed church was designed by Professor Hector Corfiato.

Following the attempted assassination on his life on 19 February 1937, Governor-General Rodolfo Graziani believed the monastery's monks and novices were involved in this attack, and unwilling to wait for the results of the official investigation, ordered Italian fascist colonialists to massacre the inhabitants of this monastery. On 21 May of that year, 297 monks and 23 laymen were killed. Overall, between 1,700 and 2,100 civilians were slaughtered in two mass executions on 21 May and 26 May. While the massacre of Addis Ababa in February 1937 had a spontaneous character about it, the massacre of Debre Libanos was planned meticulously by Graziani himself after he had recovered from his wounds. The date chosen for the massacre, 20 May (12 Ginbot), marked the annual celebration of the transfer of St Tekelehaimanot (the saint for the monastery was constructed) to the shrine. In November, after months of imprisonment, 360 survivors from the massacre were deported to Danane concentration camp near Mogadishu, partly through Debre Birhan and the Nefasit prison. Additionally, 30 school boys from Debre Birhan were deported in secrecy partly to cover up the dimensions of the massacre, with Graziani claiming they had instead been "sent [back] to their native homes" in false reports to Rome. Approximately half of those deported (and 16 of the 30 school children) would die in Danane.

When Buxton visited Debre Libanos in the mid-1940s, he found the remains of these victims were plainly visible ("Here were innumerable bones and skulls – bones in bags and bones in boxes, bones lying in confused heaps, awaiting burial"). A cross-shaped tomb was afterwards built to contain their remains, standing next to the parking lot.

== Mosaics ==
Mosaics on the exterior front facade and stained-glass windows for the monastery were made and exhibited in London at the Festival Hall by E.O. Hevezi and G.J. Bajo.

== Burials ==
- Tekle Haymanot died in about 1313, was buried in the cave above the monastery, and was reinterred in the monastery about 60 years later.
- Abuna Basilios (23 April 1891 – 19 October 1970) the first Ethiopian-born archbishop or abuna, and later the first patriarch, of the Ethiopian Orthodox Tewahedo Church.

== Acts of St. Paul and St. Sarabamon (Tweed MS150) ==
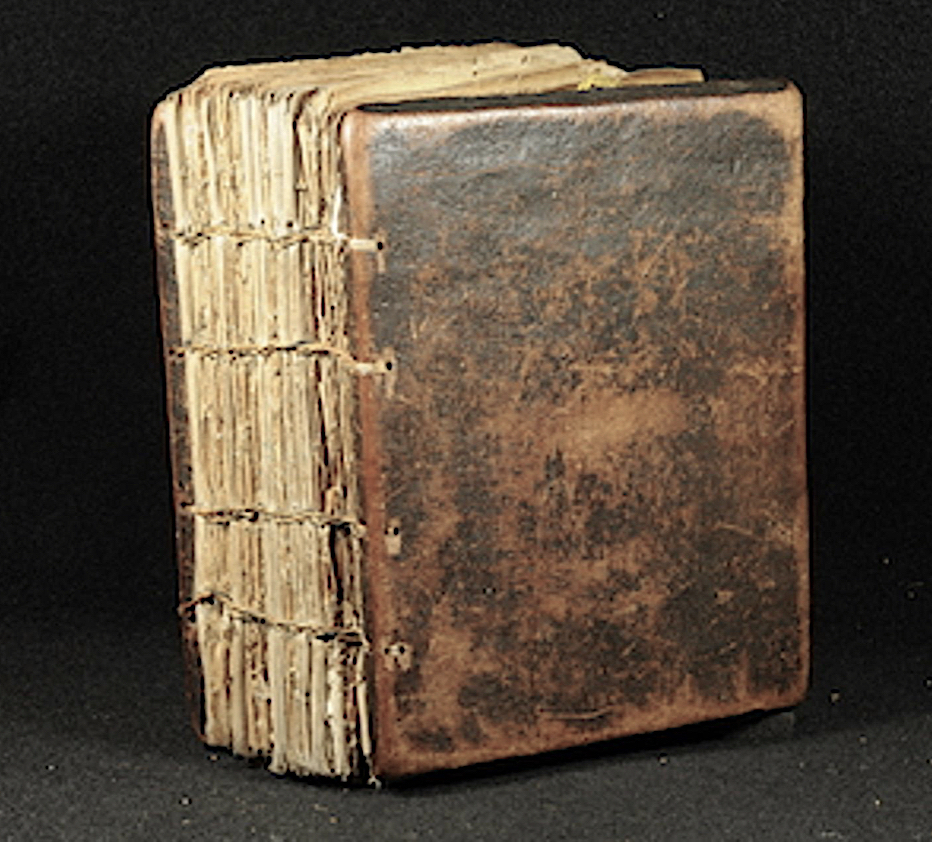
Manuscript of Gebra Paulos and Gebra Sarabamon, known as Tweed MS150, now in Debre Libanos.

André Tweed (1914 – 1993) collected a significant number of Ethiopian manuscripts which he gifted to Howard University shortly before his death. In 2005 and 2006, Gay Byron (1961-2023), then Baptist Missionary Training School Professor of New Testament and Christian Origins at Colgate Rochester Crozer Divinity School, travelled to Washington, D.C. to examine the Tweed collection. Subsequent to her research and that of Getatchew Haile and Ted Erho, the School of Divinity recognised in 2012 that Tweed MS150 had been microfilmed as part of a UNESCO project in 1976 when it was in Debre Libanos. Arrangements for the return were put in train and in 2016 a contingent from the School of Divinity travelled with the manuscript to Ethiopia, the official handover ceremony taking place on 11 January.
