= Abuna =

Honorific title of Orthodox Tewahedo Church bishop

Patriarch of Ethiopia
- የኢትዮጵያ ኦርቶዶክስ ተዋሕዶ ቤተክርስቲያን ፓትሪያርክ
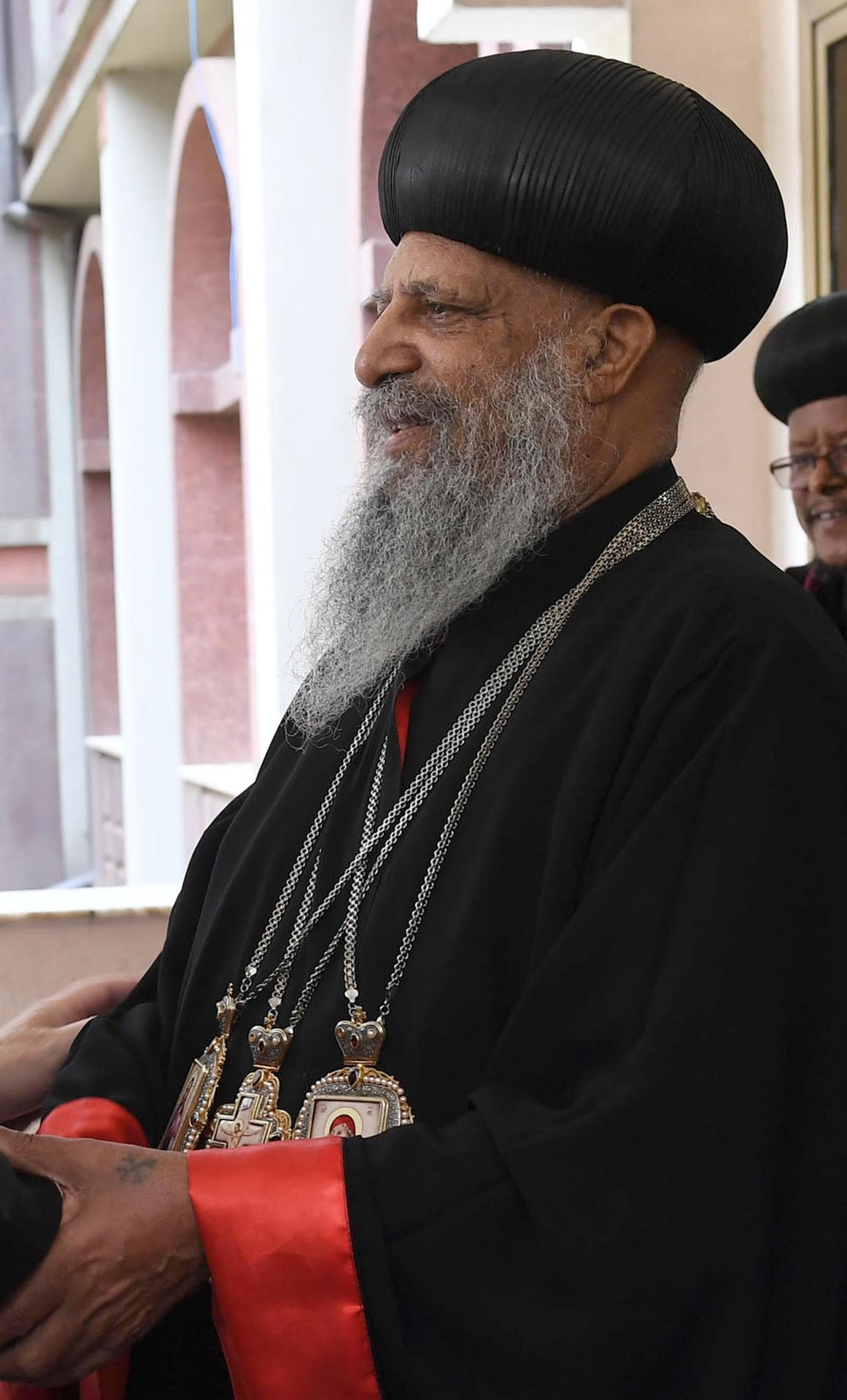
- Incumbent; Abune Mathias since 2013
- Style: His Beatitude/His Holiness
- Residence: Addis Ababa, Ethiopia
- Formation: 1959
- First holder: Abuna Basilios, First Patriarch of Ethiopia
- Website: www.eotc-patriarch.org

Abuna (or Abune, which is the status constructus form used when a name follows: Ge'ez አቡነ abuna/abune, 'our father'; Amharic and Tigrinya) is the honorific title used for any bishop of the Ethiopian Orthodox Tewahedo Church as well as of the Eritrean Orthodox Tewahedo Church. It was historically used solely for the head of the Coptic Orthodox Church in Ethiopia during the more than 1000 years when the Coptic Patriarchate of Alexandria appointed only one bishop at a time to serve its Ethiopian flock. When referred to without a name following, it is Abun, and if a name follows, it becomes Abuna (e.g., Abuna Paulos).

== History ==
Historically the Abun of the Ethiopian Church was appointed by the Pope of Alexandria and Patriarch of All Africa, who had diocesan authority over Ethiopia and the rest of Africa, at the request of the Emperor and, in historic times, after paying a substantial fee to the Muslim government for the privilege. The Abun would be selected from the membership of the Monastery of Saint Anthony. Although several Abuns might be appointed at one time, a request in 1140 to appoint enough to consecrate a metropolitan was refused.

The candidate frequently lacked knowledge of the native language and even the local customs of the Ethiopian church. As a result, most Abuns had a minimal influence on both Ethiopian religion and politics. His authority eventually was filled in ecclesiastical matters by the Ichege or Abbot of the Monastery of Debre Libanos in Shewa, the sole possessor of this particular title in Ethiopia. (This title is now customarily held by the patriarch of the Ethiopian Orthodox Tewahedo Church.)

Visitors to Ethiopia at this time, such as Francisco Álvares in the 16th century, and Remedius Prutky in the 18th century, were amazed at the mass ordination of deacons and priests with little more than a wave of the cross and a prayer, which was the Abun's principal duty.

After many centuries, Emperor Haile Selassie I of Ethiopia, the last reigning Oriental Christian monarch in the world, reached an agreement with the Coptic Orthodox Church in Alexandria, Egypt, on 13 July 1948. This led to the promotion of the Church of Ethiopia to the rank of an autocephalous Patriarchate. Five bishops were immediately consecrated by the Coptic Orthodox Pope of Alexandria. They later elected an Ethiopian patriarch for their church following the death of Abuna Qerellos IV, the last Copt to lead the Church of Ethiopia. The first Patriarch of Ethiopia was Abuna Basilios, who was consecrated 14 January 1951.

The current Patriarch of Ethiopia is Abune Mathias, who succeeded Abune Paulos upon his death August 16, 2012.

== Other usage ==
Abuna (Syriac: ܐܒܘܢܐ Abuna, Arabic: أبونا ʾabūnā, literally 'our father') is also a title used among Syriac Christians, Coptic Christians, Antiochian Arab Christians, Melkite Catholics, and Maronite Christians to refer to a priest. The title is used either by itself or with the priest's given name (for example, 'Abuna Tauma' for 'Father Thomas'). This title is not used in self-reference, rather the priest would refer to himself as al-Ab (الأب al-ʾAb, literally 'the father').

== See also ==
- Ab (Semitic)
- Ethiopian aristocratic and court titles
- List of abunas of Ethiopia
- List of abunas of Eritrea
- Abouna (disambiguation)
