= Timeline of Orthodox Tewahedo Christianity =

The following is a chronology of the Orthodox Tewahedo Ethiopian and Eritrean Orthodox churches from their base history to the present.

== Early history ==
- 1st century - The Agʿazi or known by the Greeks as Aethiopians may have been present in Jerusalem during the preaching of Peter in Acts 2:38, according to John Chrysostom in the late fourth century
- 1st century – according to the New Testament book Acts 8:26–27, Philip the Evangelist baptized the Ethiopian eunuch.
- Early 4th century – Some Apostles reportedly took missions to Askum. Socrates of Constantinople stated Aethiopia (Modern Day Eritrea and Northern Ethiopia) was one of region preached by Matthew the Apostle where a specific mention of "Aethiopia south of the Caspian Sea".
- 330 AD – Christianity, it is widely considered, is introduced to Askum by a Syrian Greek named Frumentius, after his voyage with his brother Aedesius to the Kingdom of Aksum. There, the two brothers were captured by the native Aksumite and brought to court forwarded to King Ezana and his brother Saizana, who was converted to Christianity by influence of Frumentius.
- 356 AD – Emperor Constantius writes a letter to King Ezana asking him to replace Frumentius with an Arian bishop, which Ezana rejects.
- 4th century – Debre Sina Monastery was traditionally founded in the Eritrean Highlands, in modern-day Eritrea, during the early spread of Christianity in the Aksumite Kingdom. It is said to have been founded by Saint Aba Salama (Frumentius) and is considered one of the oldest Christian monasteries in the world.
- 480 – Arrival of "Nine Saints" monastic anti-Chalcedonian refugees who allegedly introduced Pachomian monastic life to Ethiopia.

== Middle Ages ==
- 960 AD – Queen Gudit persecutes Axumite Christians during the sacking of the city.
- 12th century – Communion with Coptic Orthodox Church of Alexandria.
- 1284 – establishment of Debre Atsbo by Tekle Haymanot
- Late 14th century – Samuel of Waldebba founds the Waldebba monastery, which would go on to be one of the most important monasteries in Ethiopia.
- 15th century Abba Estifanos of Gwendagwende established Stephanites, a dissenting movement that resembled Proto-Protestantism
- 1439 – During the reign of Emperor Zara Yaqob, a religious discussion took place between Giyorgis and a French visitor led to the dispatch of an embassy from Ethiopia to the Vatican.
- 1450 – Council of Debre Mitmaq in Tegulet convoked by Zara Yaqob convinced Coptic Orthodox hierarchy to acquiesce observance of two Sabbaths advocated by Ewostatewos before.
- 1507 – Mateus, an Armenian, had been sent as an Ethiopian envoy to Portugal.
- 1520 – an embassy under Dom Rodrigo de Lima landed in Ethiopia.

== Early modern period ==
- 1534 – Michael the Deacon met with Martin Luther and affirmed the Augsburg Confession as a "good creed". In addition, Martin Luther stated that the Lutheran Mass agreed with that used by the Ethiopian Orthodox Church. As a result, the Lutheran churches extended fellowship with the Ethiopian Orthodox Church.
- 1620 – Council of Fogära called to debate between the Jesuit and Ethiopian Orthodox views. Tewahedo (union), Qəbat (unction), and Yetsegga Leg (Son of Grace) christological movements arise in response to questions raised by Jesuits at this council about the anointing of Christ.
- 1622 – Conversion of Emperor Susenyos I to Roman Catholicism under the pressure of Jesuits.
- 1624 – Susenyos proclaimed the primacy of Rome and condemned local practices which included Saturday Sabbath and frequent fasts.
- 1632 – Emperor Fasilides restored the state administration to Orthodox Tewahedo after ten years conflict.
- 1633 – Fasilides expelled the Jesuits and in 1665, he ordered that all Jesuit books (the Book of the Franks) be burned.
- 23 June 1655 – Emperor Fasilides and Metropolitan Mika'el IV hold a council, anathematizing anyone who does not hold to the Qəbat doctrine.
- 1687 – Emperor Iyasu I holds a council condemning the Qəbat doctrine.
- Late 17th century – A series of decisive councils are held from 1689 to 1699 declaring Yetsegga Leg as official doctrine.
- March 1707 – Emperor Takla Haymanot holds a council condemning and imprisoning the Qəbat leaders.
- Early 18th century – The Patriarch of Alexandria suggests a new creed to unite the Tewahedo and Qəbat factions, but it is seen as favoring the Tewahedo, sparking new conflict.
- Mid 18th century – The Śost Lədät (Three Births) christological movement arises during the continuing christological crisis.
- 1 October 1763 – After a massacre of monastics, a council at Kayla Meda in Gondär has Qəbat and Tewahedo theologians join to counter the Śost Lədät.
- 1855 – Emperor Tewodros II calls council of Amba Cara, affirming Tewahedo.
- 1878 – Each region of Ethiopia supports a different christological position, threatening a greater conflict. Emperor Yohannis of Ethiopia convenes a council at Boru Meda to eliminate the christological disputes, affirming the Tewahedo position and condemning the Qəbat and Śost Lədät.The Tewahedo position has remained de facto the official position of the Ethiopian Orthodox Tewahedo Church ever since.
- 19th century – Publication of Amharic translation Bible began developing.

== 20th century ==
- 1909 – Royal edict rules upon the house of Waldebba rivalry in favor of the Betä Minas (one divinity) Trinitarian belief as opposed to the Betä Ṭama (three divinities), which the Betä Ṭama see as overruling the previous synod of Boru Meda. The controversy reigns until this day.
- 30 November 1942 – Emperor Haile Selassie ordered decree that allowed reforms on the Church with centralized financial funds.
- 13 July 1948 – the Coptic Orthodox Church agreed for autocephaly of the Ethiopian Orthodox Church.
- 14 January 1951 – the autocephaly was ended when Coptic Orthodox Pope Joseph II consecrated an Ethiopian-born Archbishop.
- 1959 – Abuna Basilios crowned as the first Patriarch of Ethiopia.
- 1974 – Disestablishment of the Church following the rise of the Derg and its nationalized land policy.
- 1979 – Patriarch Theophilos was executed by the Derg.
- 1991 – Abdication of Abune Merkorios under the pressure of EPRDF.
- 1992 – Installation of Abune Paulos and creation of Exile Church.
- 28 September 1993 – Autocephaly of the Eritrean Orthodox Tewahedo Church formally approved by Coptic Patriarch Shenouda III.

== 21st century ==
- 16 August 2012 – death of Abune Paulos.
- 28 February 2013 – Abune Mathias from Agame province, elected as the 6th Patriarch of the Ethiopian Orthodox Church.
- 25 July 2018 – with the assistance of Prime Minister Abiy Ahmed, delegation took place between the patriarchate in Addis Ababa and those from the United States exiled Churches and declared reunification in Washington, D.C.
- 7 May 2021 – The Tigrayan Orthodox Tewahedo Church unilaterally declares their autocephaly.
- 22 January 2023 – Abune Sawiros, Abune Ewostatewos and Abune Zena Markos designated 26-made Archbishops to overthrow the Holy Synod led by Patriarch Abune Mathias in Oromia Region diocese. The Holy Synod responded the ordination as "illegal" and excommunicated three archbishops on 26 January. On 31 January, the Prime Minister Abiy Ahmed convened a discussion on the matter, which he told he would ensure resolution for the conflict. His speech widely criticized by Holy Synod for lack of protection and also alleged involvement to the illegally formed Synod.
