= Ezra of Gunda Gunde =

15th–16th-century Ethiopian monk and Stephanite leader

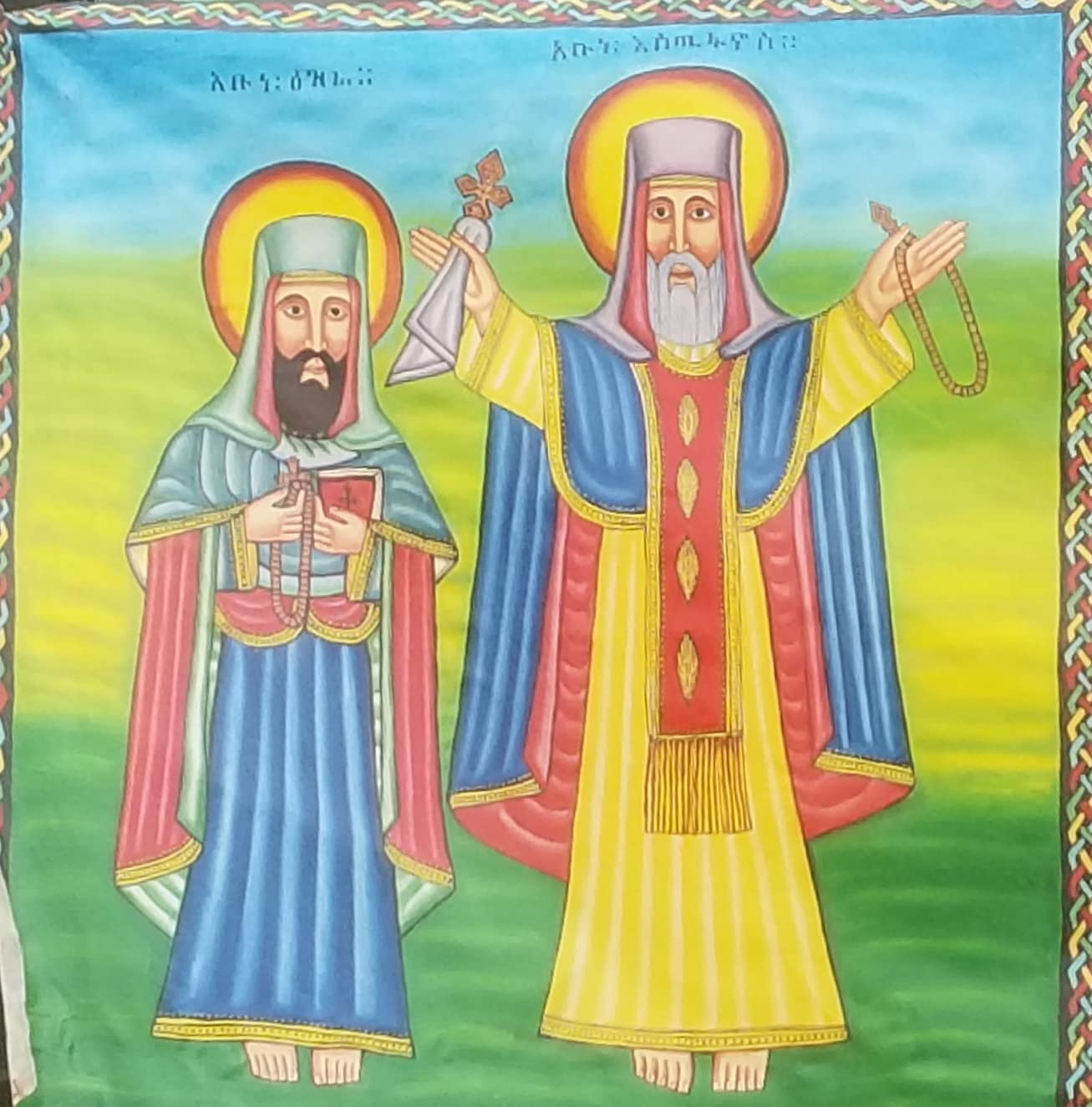
- Depiction of Abba Ezra (left) being blessed by Abba Estifanos (right)
- Born: c. 1460; Käsad Enba, Agame, Tigray, Ethiopian Empire
- Died: c. 1520; Dus'a, Ethiopian Empire
- Occupations: Monk and priest
- Known for: Defense and reconciliation of the Stephanites
- Religion: Christianity
- Denomination: Ethiopian Christianity
- Theological work
- Tradition or movement: Stephanite

Ezra of Gunda Gunde (Geʽez: ዕዝራ, romanized: ʿƎzra; c. 1460 – c. 1522), also known as Abba Ezra or Abunä Ezra, was an Ethiopian Christian monk and priest and one of the leading figures of the Stephanite movement in the late 15th and early 16th centuries. Although conventionally associated in scholarship with Gunda Gunde, Ezra was born at Käsad Enba in Agame, in Tigray. He entered the Stephanite community at Käswa, later associated with Gunda Gunde, at the age of twelve.

Ezra became particularly prominent after travelling to Egypt and Jerusalem to obtain holy orders for the persecuted Stephanite community. He later spent nine years at the court of Emperor Na'od, where he successfully defended the Stephanites before royal and ecclesiastical authorities. His intervention contributed to the lifting of their excommunication and marked an important stage in the movement's gradual reconciliation with the Ethiopian Church.

Much of the information about his life derives from the Gädlä Ezra, his hagiographical Acts, edited and translated by André Caquot in 1961. The work is one of the principal surviving sources for the history of the Stephanite movement from the perspective of its own members.

== Early life and monastic vocation ==
According to his Acts, Ezra was born at Käsad Enba in the district of Həzba Səbuha in Agame, in Tigray. His parents were Yəshaq and Lä'ul Sämra. Following the death of his father, Ezra began his religious life at the age of twelve, when his elder brother Estifanos brought him to Käswa, where he studied under the monk Yəshaq, then head of the monastery. There he received the monastic habit and the name Ezra.

Ezra's later association with Gunda Gunde derives from his monastic career rather than from his place of birth. Taddesse Tamrat notes that the Stephanites gradually shifted their centre of activity from Shire toward Agame, the native region of Estifanos and of several prominent members of the movement.

The community to which Ezra belonged had suffered extensive persecution during the reign of Emperor Zara Yaqob. Many Stephanite clergy had been killed, while relatively few ordained members remained. Despite their excommunication, the Stephanites continued to regard themselves as members of the Ethiopian Church rather than as a separate religious community.

By the later 15th century, Ezra and Gäbrä Mäsih I emerged as two of the most prominent figures of the second generation of Stephanite leaders.

== Journey to Egypt and Jerusalem ==
Because the Stephanite community suffered from a shortage of ordained clergy, its leader Abäkäräzun selected a group of twelve monks, including Ezra, for a mission to Egypt and the Holy Land. Taddesse Tamrat dates their departure to October 1475, while the chronology preserved in Ezra's Acts has also been interpreted as placing it in 1476.

The mission had several purposes: the monks sought ordination, wished to present their grievances concerning the persecution of their community, and intended to make a pilgrimage to the Holy Land. According to Robert Beylot, five of the twelve monks died during the journey.

The Stephanites encountered hostility from other Ethiopian pilgrims, who repeatedly accused them of heresy. One account records an accusation that the travellers were secretly Falasha who refused to bow before Mary and the Cross. Historian Steven Kaplan considers the identification with the Falasha to refer to the Stephanites themselves, possibly as a hostile or pejorative designation used by their opponents.

In Egypt, Ezra defended the Stephanites before the patriarch, after which the members of the delegation received the diaconate. Ezra subsequently continued to Jerusalem. Beylot states that after approximately three years outside Ethiopia he received priestly ordination from a Syrian bishop named John, who was under the Syrian patriarchal see.

Taddesse Tamrat notes that the circumstances and chronology of Ezra's ordination remain uncertain. The Gädlä Ezra associates his ordination with the Syrian ecclesiastical hierarchy in Jerusalem, while the narrative also mentions a Patriarch Yohannes in Cairo, making the precise identification of the churchmen involved difficult.

== Return to Ethiopia ==
Ezra returned to Ethiopia with technical knowledge acquired during his travels. He became especially renowned for his ability to construct a watermill, initially building one for his own monastic community. According to Taddesse Tamrat, news of this achievement spread widely and eventually reached the imperial court.

Emperor Eskender attempted to summon Ezra to court, but he repeatedly refused. During the reign of Na'od, however, Gäbrä Mäsih permitted him to go to the imperial court. Ezra arrived there in 1499 and remained for the final nine years of Na'od's reign, until 1508.

Taddesse Tamrat argues that Ezra consciously used his technical reputation as an opportunity to gain access to the imperial court, with the broader aim of clearing the name of Estifanos and ending the persecution of the Stephanite community. Ezra also constructed a watermill at the request of the emperor.

== Reconciliation of the Stephanites ==
Ezra's period at Na'od's court became one of the most consequential episodes in the history of the Stephanite movement. He publicly defended Estifanos and his followers against accusations concerning their attitude toward the Virgin Mary and the Cross. At a royal assembly, Ezra declared that neither Estifanos nor his disciples had rejected their veneration and demonstrated his own position by prostrating himself before an image of Mary and before the Cross when these were brought before him by court officials.

Ezra then demanded that the excommunications imposed on Estifanos and his followers be revoked. According to Taddesse Tamrat, the Egyptian metropolitan appears to have accepted this demand, after which Stephanite monks were able to appear openly at court and receive holy orders. Beylot similarly states that Ezra successfully obtained from the bishop the lifting of the excommunication of both living and deceased Stephanites.

The reconciliation continued under succeeding metropolitans. Ezra maintained particularly good relations with Metropolitan Marqos, who ordained Stephanite clergy and consecrated numerous tabots for their communities.

Tamrat describes the years 1499–1508 as a turning point in the history of the Stephanites, although he argues that Ezra's success also opened the way for the movement's eventual absorption into the wider Ethiopian Church. Getatchew Haile similarly associates the relaxation of hostility toward the movement with Ezra's successful defense of the Stephanite cause at the royal court.

== Later life and death ==
The improved relations did not survive Na'od's death in 1508. During the minority of his successor Lebna Dengel, persecution of the Stephanites resumed. Ezra was forced to flee, first taking refuge at Läkma and later returning to Käswa. On one return he found the monastery church burned and participated in its reconstruction.

In old age and poor health, Ezra was invited to Dus'a by Gäbrä Mäsih, head of the Stephanite community. He died there and was initially buried at Dus'a. His remains were subsequently transferred to Käswa.

The exact date of Ezra's death is not known. Beylot places it sometime before the death of Gäbrä Mäsih, while Taddesse Tamrat's reconstruction gives approximately 1520.

== Reputation and legacy ==
Beylot describes Ezra as possessing considerable learning and unusually broad technical knowledge and considers his reputation to have surpassed that of Gäbrä Mäsih among the later Stephanites.

Ezra was remembered as a saint within the Stephanite tradition. His Gädl became one of the major sources through which the movement preserved its own interpretation of the conflicts of the 15th century. Later Stephanite tradition also associated him with Gunda Gunde as a craftsman. Wooden processional and hand crosses decorated with metal inlay preserved at the monastery have been attributed to him in local tradition.

Hostile traditions about Ezra also developed among opponents of the Stephanites. A later version of the Ethiopian short chronicle portrayed him as having acquired learning and magical knowledge abroad and accused him of an adulterous relationship with Emperor Eskender's wife. Beylot treats this material as part of a hostile legendary tradition surrounding Ezra rather than as reliable biographical information.

== Historiography ==
The principal narrative source for Ezra's life is the Gädlä Ezra. Getatchew Haile identifies the publication of Ezra's Acts by André Caquot as one of the major contributions that made it possible to reconstruct the Stephanite movement from sources produced by its own adherents rather than solely from writings hostile to it.

Modern scholarship has differed on some details of Ezra's chronology, particularly the dating of his journey abroad and his return to Ethiopia. A much later account composed during the reign of Iyasu II placed the pilgrimage in the reign of Na'od, but Beylot rejects this chronology as inconsistent with the earlier Stephanite hagiographical sources and regards the later text as strongly hostile and legendary in character.

== See also ==
- Abba Estifanos of Gwendagwende
- Gunda Gunde Monastery
- Christian monasticism in Ethiopia
- Ethiopian Orthodox Tewahedo Church
