= Persecution of Orthodox Tewahedo Christianity =

Persecution of Oriental Orthodox Christianity

The persecution of the Ethiopian and Eritrean Orthodox Tewahedo Church has been surging over centuries. The church has encountered significant challenges throughout its history. Historically, notable persecutions attributed during Yodit Gudit era in 980, Ahmad ibn Ibrahim al-Ghazi invasion of Ethiopian Empire during the Ethiopian-Adal War (1529–1542) and the Italian occupation of Ethiopia (1936–1941). Still, the church faces significant persecutions where many Christians are killed by government forces and churches are burnt amidst political crisis. During the tension between Ethiopian Orthodox and the illegal Oromia synod, three people killed after unknown assailants opened fire in Shashamane in Oromia on 2 February 2023. According to witness, the Oromia police was the perpetrator of the attack. It is observed during Axum massacre in the Tigray War where 750 people reportedly killed in Axum Tsion feast day celebrated on 30 November.

== Historical perspectives ==
Around 980 AD, Gudit began sacking Aksum, and burnt several thousands Ethiopian Orthodox churches and monuments before eliminating the king Dil Na'od and other monarchs of Aksumite lines. The destruction of churches asserted by some Ethiopian traditions that Gudit's ethnicity was Jewish. The Ethiopian Christian and Islam tensions also major factors of the persecution, such as the Ethiopian-Adal War in 1529, where Ahmad ibn Ibrahim al-Ghazi destroyed after he occupied much of Shewa, Gondar, Wollo and part of Tigray. According to Ethiopian Church records, 10 Ethiopian Christians were forcefully converted to Islam as a result of Ahmad's campaign. After resilient struggle of Emperor Dawit II, the Portuguese failed to assist him and he died after evicting to Debre Damo Monastery, prompting Ahmad to destroy more church properties. After the defeat of Ahmad in 1543 by Emperor Galawdewos, he began rebuilding churches and attempt to restore peace, but he was weakened by Ahmad's successors until his final death.

Catholicism activities in Ethiopia has also raised concern over anti-Ethiopian Orthodoxy in the 16th century, especially after the conversion of Emperor Susenyos I to Catholicism in 1622 and subsequent Catholic rule for a decade. In 1626, the Catholic Patriarch Afonso Mendes abolished any Ethiopian Orthodox practices abroad which led to unrest. The same way anti-Ethiopian Orthodox feelings were propagated throughout the Italian invasion involving mass killings of its followers and clergies. Following the Yekatit 12 massacre, the Italians massacred over 2,000 monks at Debre Libanos Monastery in 1937 ordered by Italian viceroy Rudolfo Graziani. Abune Petros was amongst victims who was publicly executed by eight carabinieri in Addis Ababa in 1936. Historian Adam Clayton Powell Jr. condemned Mussolini for trying to exterminate Orthodox Christians and doubted that the Catholics of America and of Harlem community in New York neglecting this action. The Italians concerned the status of freedom of religion in the country, where the used Ethiopian Orthodox under their supervision as many of observance and rites were held in the presence of Italian officials.

== Contemporary era ==
Many churches faces significant challenges in lieu of the current political instabilities in Ethiopia, such as in Axum massacre in the Tigray War. Arson attacks are widely reported and Orthodox leaders complained such incidents several years ago. The Ethiopian government is accused of "masterminding" killings of several Christians for political purpose. For instance, three Christians were killed after unknown armed assailants opened fire in Shashamane on 2 February 2023 amidst crisis between the Ethiopian Orthodox and the illegal Oromia Region synod. According to local residents, the Oromia police was the preparator of the attack. The Axum massacre in late 2020 happened just before annual Axum Tsion Festival, a major Ethiopian Orthodox festival on 30 November. It was perpetuated by the Ethiopian and Eritrean joint forces after they took control of the city on 19 November according to Amnesty International.

== 2025–2026 Arsi Zone massacres ==
Since October 2025, a series of massacres and targeted attacks against Ethiopian Orthodox Tewahedo Christians in the Arsi Zone of the Oromia Region have resulted in hundreds of deaths, widespread displacement, and the destruction of churches and property. The violence has been described by human rights groups as “ethnic cleansing” and a “systematic pattern of religious persecution.”

=== Background ===
The Arsi Zone, located in southeastern Oromia, has experienced recurring ethno‑religious violence since at least 2016. Attacks have periodically intensified, with major waves documented in 2020, 2022, August 2023, and November 2023. Orthodox Christians many of whom are of Amhara background have been disproportionately targeted.

=== 2025 massacres ===
In October 2025, the Ethiopian Orthodox Tewahedo Church (EOTC) reported that more than 25 civilians had been killed in the East Arsi Zone. According to the church, the victims were “followers of the Orthodox Tewahedo faith,” shot or fatally stabbed by unknown gunmen. A religious leader in the area stated that approximately 190 people had been killed in similar attacks since 2021. On 28 October 2025, five members of the same family were killed in Honqolo Wabe (Siltana) district.

In early November 2025, five Orthodox Christians were killed while working on teff farms in Merti district. Three missing individuals from a previous attack were found dead, bringing the total number of Orthodox Christian victims in the area to 33 since October. Local church representatives stated that over 140 people had been killed since September in Sherka district alone. In one case, a child survivor underwent a leg amputation after being shot.

=== 2026 massacres ===
Violence escalated further in early 2026. In late February, the Ethiopian Human Rights Commission (EHRC) documented attacks that killed 34 Orthodox Christians, including 26 in Shirka and 4 in Merti. The EHRC noted that this brought the total number of victims in Shirka district alone to 164 for the year. The commission also reported 8 hospitalized victims, 8 missing persons, and 2 abductions.

On 26 February 2026, attackers stormed a market in eastern Arsi, killing 20 Orthodox Christians and a Muslim guard. A priest was killed when attackers entered a church singing religious songs before shooting those present. Two days later, on 28 February, another attack killed seven people inside a church.

In March 2026, the EHRC accused the Oromo Liberation Army (OLA/OLF‑Shene) of carrying out mass attacks against civilians in the Arsi Zone, although the OLA rejected the accusation and instead blamed government‑affiliated forces.

In late May and early June 2026, further attacks coincided with the national election period. On 30 May, violence began in Teleta Gebriel, a remote area of Aseko District, and spread to other districts. At least 35 Orthodox Christians were killed, with some reports suggesting 37 to 40 deaths. Militants reportedly beheaded victims, burned villages and churches, and destroyed property. The EOTC's Arsi Diocese reported at least 13 Orthodox Christians killed in separate attacks beginning on 31 May. The 101‑year‑old Teleta Saint Gabriel Church was burned down, and Kara Kuftena Medhane Alem Church was looted.

=== Perpetrator disputes and government response ===
The identity of the perpetrators remains disputed. The Ethiopian federal government and the Oromia regional authorities have repeatedly blamed the Oromo Liberation Army (OLA/OLF‑Shene). Prime Minister Abiy Ahmed extended condolences and stated that the attacks were carried out with the “clear intention to inflame ethnic and religious tensions.”

The OLA has denied responsibility, accusing government‑affiliated forces or mercenaries of staging the killings to justify repression. The group has also claimed that armed actors targeted Orthodox Christians to provoke tensions between Amhara and Oromo communities.

=== International reactions and documentation ===
Sister Oriental Orthodox churches including the Coptic Orthodox Church, the Syriac Orthodox Church, the Armenian Apostolic Church, the Eritrean Orthodox Tewahedo Church, and the Malankara Churches issued a joint statement noting that “Churches, monasteries, and Orthodox Christian communities have been systematically singled out for violence and destruction.”

The World Council of Churches (WCC) expressed support for “efforts toward justice, peace, and communal harmony.” WCC General Secretary Prof. Jerry Pillay stated that the “senseless loss of life is a painful reminder of the fragility of peace and the urgent need for reconciliation.”

== See also ==
- Axum massacre
- 2023 Ethiopian Orthodox Tewahedo Church crisis
