= Getatchew Haile =

Ethiopian-American philologist (1931–2021)

Getachew Haile
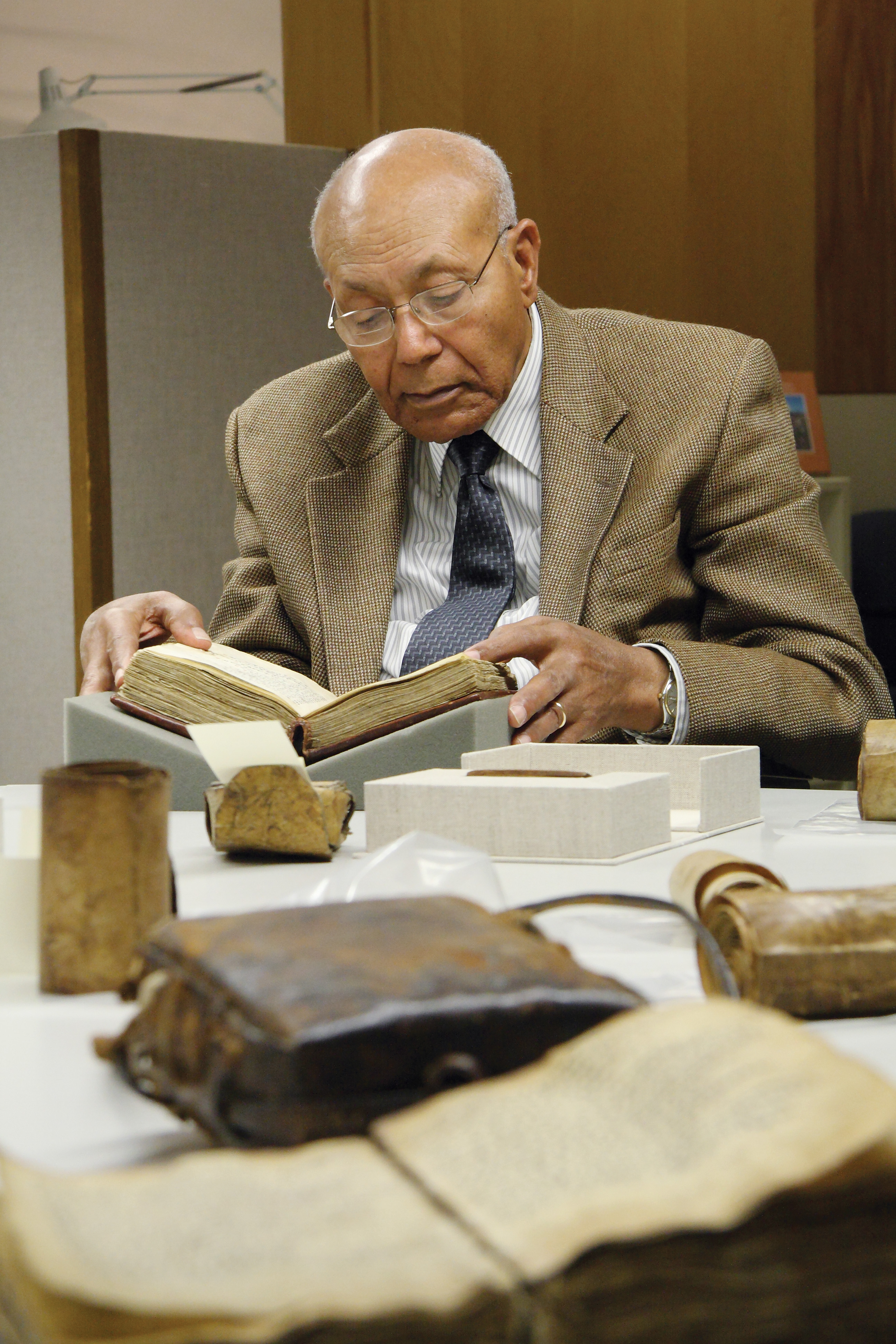
- Haile reading Geʽez manuscripts in 2012
- Born: April 19, 1931; Shenkora, Shewa province, Ethiopian Empire
- Died: June 11, 2021 (aged 90); Mount Sinai Morningside, New York, U.S.
- Education: Coptic Theological Seminary (B.D.); American University in Cairo (B.A.); University of Tübingen (Ph.D)
- Occupation: Philologist
- Years active: 1957–2021
- Notable work: Acta Aethiopica (1980–89)

Getatchew Haile (Amharic: ጌታቸው ኀይሌ, romanized: Gētachew Ḫäyilē; April 19, 1931 – June 10, 2021) was an Ethiopian-American philologist widely considered the foremost scholar of the Geʽez language and one of its most prolific (he published more than 150 books and articles). He was acknowledged for his contributions to the field with a MacArthur Fellows Program "genius" award and the Edward Ullendorff Medal from the Council of the British Academy. He was the first Ethiopian and the first African to win the award.

== Early life ==
Haile was born in the rural village of Tute in Shenkora (part of the province of Shoa in the Ethiopian Empire). As a boy, he attended an Ethiopian Orthodox Church school, where he learned the Geʽez liturgical language and "devoted his energies to reading and understanding the texts."

From 1945 to 1951, he attended Trinity School in Addis Ababa. Haile moved to Cairo in 1952, and lived there through most of the 1950s, graduating from the Coptic Theological College, Cairo, Egypt with a B.D. in 1957, and from the American University in Cairo, with a B.A. in 1957. He then moved to West Germany in 1957, where he received a Ph.D. from the University of Tübingen in Semitic Philology in 1962. The title of his dissertation was Das Verbalsystem im Äthiopischen: Ein morphologischer Vergleich mit den orientalischen semitischen Sprachen. Haile married Misrak Amare on July 12, 1964, in Sidamo.

During the Ethiopian Revolution in 1974, Haile, a believer in constitutional monarchy under the Solomonic dynasty, became a member of the transitional Ethiopian Parliament from Shoa province. Due to his vocal criticism of both dictator Mengistu Haile Mariam and the Marxist–Leninist and Soviet-backed Derg military dictatorship, the Ethiopian Army came to Haile's home at the beginning of the Red Terror in 1975. According to the Ethiopian Government, Haile was involved in a shootout while resisting arrest, but was eventually wounded and captured. According to Getachew Haile, on the other hand, he was the victim of a premeditated and unprovoked assassination attempt by a Derg death squad. After the BBC World Service and Voice of America publicized him as a prisoner of conscience worldwide, the Ethiopian government released him. Through the intervention of friends, Haile was allowed to travel to London for medical treatment. He was left as a paraplegic due to bullet damage to his spinal cord, and needed to use a wheelchair for the remainder of his life.

== Academic career ==
Haile was associate professor in the Department of Ethiopian Languages and Literature, Haile Selassie I University (now Addis Ababa University), from 1962 to 1969, and 1971 to 1974, where he taught Amharic Grammar, Amharic Literature, Ge'ez Grammar, Ge'ez Literature, Arabic Grammar, and Semitic Linguistics. He was appointed head of the department in 1965.

After arriving in the U.S. in 1976, Haile joined Saint John's University in Collegeville, Minnesota. He eventually became a Regents Professor Emeritus of Medieval Studies and Curator Emeritus of the Ethiopian Study Center at the Hill Museum & Manuscript Library. At HMML, he prepared catalogues of more than six thousand Ethiopian manuscripts and trained Ethiopic manuscript cataloguers in paleography, dating, and other skills.

He was on the advisory board of a number of journals, including Comité de lecture of Analecta Bollandiana (Journal of Christian Hagiography), Ethiopian Journal of Education, Journal of Ethiopian Studies, Northeast African Studies, Ethiopian Register (1994–2001), and Acta Aethiopica (1980–89).

In addition to his writings and translations of a variety of works on Ethiopia and the Orthodox church, he produced two two-volume books on the history and beliefs of Abba Estifanos of Gwendagwende, one in 2006 and the other in 2011. His first translation, into Amharic, was of Mark Twain's short story Extracts from Adam's Diary in 1965.

The languages in which he worked were Amharic, Geʽez, Arabic, Hebrew, Latin, Greek, German, and Coptic.

== Reputation ==
Haile's work has frequently been described as foundational to the field of Ethiopian studies and has won many awards.

Edward Ullendorff, professor of Semitic studies at the School of Oriental and Asian Studies, described Haile's work as "highly significant" due to his "profoundly erudite" knowledge of Ethiopic language and literature. On another occasion, Ullendorff wrote that Haile's work represented the "most meticulous and original study of Ethiopic literature" ever done, and "on a scale and depth never before attempted." He added, "no other person before Getatchew Haile has ever been able to survey so much of Ethiopic literary creation and thus to gain so sovereign a command of this genre", which made a contribution not only to Ethiopian studies but also the study of Christian oriental writing more generally.

The Ethiopian poet Amha Asfaw wrote a poem in Amharic for him in 1999.

== Personal life ==
Haile and his wife, Misrak Amare, had four children, adopted two more, and had many grandchildren. Among his children are the material science professor Sossina M. Haile and the author Rebecca G. Haile.

Haile served as a confidante of the Patriarch of the Ethiopian Orthodox Church in the 1960s, as well as the Church's representative to the World Council of Churches.

Haile never returned to Ethiopia after leaving in 1975. He remained critical of the successive Ethiopian governments: in 2005, Ethiopian authorities charged him in absentia with treason for his comments.

Haile and his wife moved to New York City in 2016. He died at Mount Sinai Morningside hospital on June 10, 2021, at the age of 90. President Sahle-Work Zewde expressed her condolences to Haile's family in a press release.

== Lectures ==
Haile gave a video lecture on the Täˀammərä Maryam, the Ethiopian Miracles of Mary stories, on May 23, 2020. Alessandro Bausi (professor, University of Hamburg), Kay Shelemay (professor, Harvard University), Elias Wondimu (CEO of Tsehai Publishers), and Habtamu Tegegne (professor, Rutgers University) spoke about Getatchew Haile's contributions.

In 2018, he gave an Amharic-language interview for EBS TV at the Minneapolis Institute of Art. He also gave a video lecture at the Hill Museum & Manuscript Library in April 2020.

== Honors and distinctions ==
- Honored by festschrift: Echoes of Heritage in “the Land of Origins”: Ethiopian Manuscripts, Languages, and Culture and Faith. A Gedenkschrift to Prof. Emer. Getatchew Haile (1931–2021), edited by Mersha Alehegne Mengistie. 2025. Berlin: LIT Verlag.
- Abebe Bikila's Life Time Achievement Award, 2018
- Honoree of a festschrift volume in 2017: Studies in Ethiopian Languages, Literature, and History Festschrift for Getatchew Haile Presented by his Friends and Colleagues
- Council of the British Academy, Edward Ullendorff Medal 2014, awarded for scholarly distinction and achievements in the field of Semitic languages or Ethiopian studies
- Society of Ethiopians Established in Diaspora Annual Award, 1986
- Corresponding Fellow of the British Academy, 1987–2021
- MacArthur Fellows Program, John D. and Catherine T. MacArthur Fellowship, 1988–1993
- Ethiopian Government Award for academic excellence, 1991 (declined)
- Member, Ethiopian Parliament, representing the province of Shoa, 1974–75

== Books ==
- The Homily of Zär'a Ya'əqob's Mäshafä Bərhan on the Rite of Baptism and Religious Instruction CSCO, text, Vol. 653/114, and trans., Vol. 654/115. Louvain: Peeters, 2013
- Voices from Däbrä Zämäddo: Acts of Abba Bärtälomewos and Abba Yoḥannǝs 45 Miracles of Mary (Aethiopistische Forschungen 79), Wiesbaden 2013
- A History of the first Estifanosite Monks. 2 vols. (ed. & tr.) Louvain: Peeters, 2011, ISBN 978-90-429-2513-7
- Amdafta Lawgahu (Let Me Entertain You for a Moment: An Amharic Autobiography), Collegeville, (Minnesota), 2008
- The Ge'ez Acts of Abba Esṭifanos of Gwendagwende, 2 vols. (ed. & tr.). Louvain: Peeters Publishers, 2006, ISBN 978-90-429-1741-5
- Deqiqe Istifanos: Behigg Amlak (Hagiographies of the Estifanosite monks who flourished and were martyred in the fifteenth century, in Amharic), Collegeville (Minnesota), 2004
- Ya'Abā Bā'rey Dersatoč (The Works of Abba Bā'rey with Other Documents Concerning the Oromo, in Amharic), Collegeville (Minnesota), 2002
- Bahra Hassab (= Computus). (On the Ethiopian Calendar, with Annals of Ethiopian History, in Amharic), Collegeville (Minnesota), 2000.
- A Catalogue of Ethiopian Manuscripts Microfilmed for the Ethiopian Manuscript Microfilm Library, Addis Ababa and for the Hill Monastic Manuscript Library, Collegeville, Vol. X: Project Numbers 4001–5000, Collegeville, (Minnesota) 1993
- The Mariology of Emperor Zära Ya'qob of Ethiopia (Orientalia Christiana Analecta, No. 242), Rome 1992
- Beauty of the Creation, with Misrak Amare, University of Manchester, 1991
- The Epistle of Humanity of Emperor Zär'a Ya'qob (Ṭomarä Tsb't), Corpus Scriptorum Christianorum Orientalium series, Vol. 522/Aeth. 95, tr. 523/Aeth. 96 (1991)
- The Faith of the Unctionists in the Ethiopian Church (Haymanot Msi'awit), Corpus Scriptorum Christianorum Orientalium series, Vol. 517/Aeth. 91 (1990)
- A Catalogue of Ethiopian Manuscripts Microfilmed for the Ethiopian Manuscript Microfilm Library, Addis Ababa and for the Hill Monastic Manuscript Library, Collegeville, Vol. IX: Project Numbers 3501–4000, Collegeville, (Minnesota) 1987. ISBN 978-0-940250-55-0
- The Different Collections of Nägś Hymns of the Ethiopic Literature (Oikonomia No. 19), Erlangen (Germany), 1983
- A Catalogue of Ethiopian Manuscripts Microfilmed for the Ethiopian Manuscript Microfilm Library, Addis Ababa and for the Hill Monastic Manuscript Library, Collegeville, Vol. VIII: Project Numbers 3001–3500, Collegeville, (Minnesota) 1985
- A Catalogue of Ethiopian Manuscripts Microfilmed for the Ethiopian Manuscript Microfilm Library, Addis Ababa and for the Hill Monastic Manuscript Library, Collegeville, Vol. VII: Project Numbers 2501–3000, (with a checklist by William F. Macomber), Collegeville, (Minnesota) 1983
- A Catalogue of Ethiopian Manuscripts Microfilmed for the Ethiopian Manuscript Microfilm Library, Addis Ababa and for the Hill Monastic Manuscript Library, Collegeville, Vol. VI: Project Numbers 2001–2500, (with a checklist by William F. Macomber), Collegeville, (Minnesota) 1982
- A Catalogue of Ethiopian Manuscripts Microfilmed for the Ethiopian Manuscript Microfilm Library, Addis Ababa and for the Hill Monastic Manuscript Library, Collegeville, Vol. V: Project Numbers 1501–2000, (with a checklist by William F. Macomber) Collegeville, (Minnesota) 1981
- A Catalogue of Ethiopian Manuscripts Microfilmed for the Ethiopian Manuscript Microfilm Library, Addis Ababa and for the Hill Monastic Manuscript Library, Collegeville, Vol. IV: Project Numbers 1101–1500, Collegeville, (Minnesota) 1979
- Mark Twain's Letters from Earth (adapted into Amharic from the German version, Tagebuch von Adam und Eva), Addis Ababa, 1968
- Das Verbalsystem im Äthiopischen. Ein morphologischer Vergleich mit den orientalischen semitischen Sprachen. Diss., Tübingen 1962
