= Samuel of Waldebba =

Middle Ages Ethiopian saint

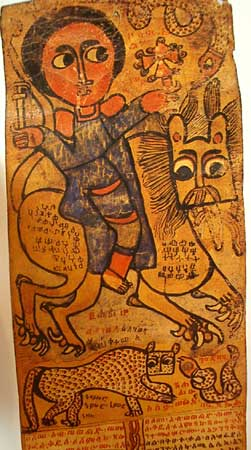
- Samuel of Waldebba riding a lion
- Born: Late 14th century Axum, Ethiopian Empire
- Died: Early 15th century Waldebba, Tigray, Ethiopian Empire
- Venerated in: Ethiopian Orthodox Church
- Feast: 21 December

Samuel of Waldebba (Ge'ez ሳሙኤል ዘዋልድባ) was a late 14th and early 15th century Ethiopian saint of the Ethiopian Orthodox Church. He is considered to be the founder of Waldebba Monastery in the Tigray Region in Ethiopia and is one of Ethiopia's most prominent saints.

== Life ==
The Gadle Samuel hagiography, written in the 15th century and with both long and short versions, states that he was born in Axum and had a brother. His mother left her husband to become a nun and Samuel followed her example by refusing to marry. He went to the monastery called Däbrä Bänkʷal, where he became a monk. After his father died, he became a coenobitic monk, living alone in the wilderness among the wild beasts. He is said to have tamed lions and performed many miracles. He walked through water without his book getting wet and Saint Michael flew him through the air to visit Jerusalem. He was an extreme ascetic; for instance, he stood in a pit praying for months, wearing sackcloth, and did not eat for forty days. He is said to have died at the age of 100.

Stories about Samuel also appear in the Ethiopian Miracles of Mary.
