= Kesis Belay Mekonnen =

Ethiopian fraudster

Belay Mekonnen
- በላይ መኮንን
- This file has an invalid non-free use claim and may be deleted after Sunday, 22 November 2026.
- Citizenship: Ethiopian
- Occupations: Priest (Kesis), church administrator
- Known for: Attempted fraud against the African Union
- Criminal charge: Attempted fraud of 6 Million USD
- Criminal penalty: Five years' rigorous imprisonment and a fine of 10,000 birr (2025); reduced on appeal to three years and seven months

Kesis Belay Mekonnen (Amharic: በላይ መኮንን), is an Ethiopian fraudster who was convicted in 2025 of attempting to defraud the African Union (AU) of more than US$6 million. Formerly, he was a priest of the Ethiopian Orthodox Tewahedo Church (EOTC) with the clerical title Kesis (priest). He led a politically motivated movement to split the Ethiopian Orthodox Church along ethnic lines and establish a separate Oromia Orthodox Church administration, which resulted in the deaths of at least 30 Orthodox Christian parishioners who had gathered at their local churches to protest. After reconciling with the church in 2020, he became deputy general manager of the EOTC Patriarchate, the post he held at the time of his arrest in April 2024.

== Fraud ==
Kesis Belay Mekonin arrived at at the Commercial Bank of Ethiopia (CBE) on 15 April 2024 with payment transfer order totaling US$6.05 million inside the branch in African Union headquarters at Addis Ababa. The documents he presented was forged AU stationery and the signatures of two officials whose signing authority had been revoked. The staff at the bank was suspicious of the seal and contacted the AU's finance department, which instructed the bank to stop the transaction. Belay was detained at the scene, and the AU filed charges against him with the Federal Police Commission subsequently.

The Federal High Court in Addis Ababa found Belay and his co-defendants guilty on15 January 2025. Prosecutors presented an evidence that the defendants had prepared a fraudulent payment document and submitted to the bank. On 30 January 2025, the court sentenced Belay to five years' rigorous imprisonment and a fine of 10,000 birr.
