= Tigrayan Orthodox Tewahedo Church =

Autocephalous Oriental Orthodox Church in Ethiopia

- ቤተ ክርስትያን ኦርቶዶክስ ተዋሕዶ ትግራይ; Bet'ə K'rstian Orthodox Tewahədo Tigray
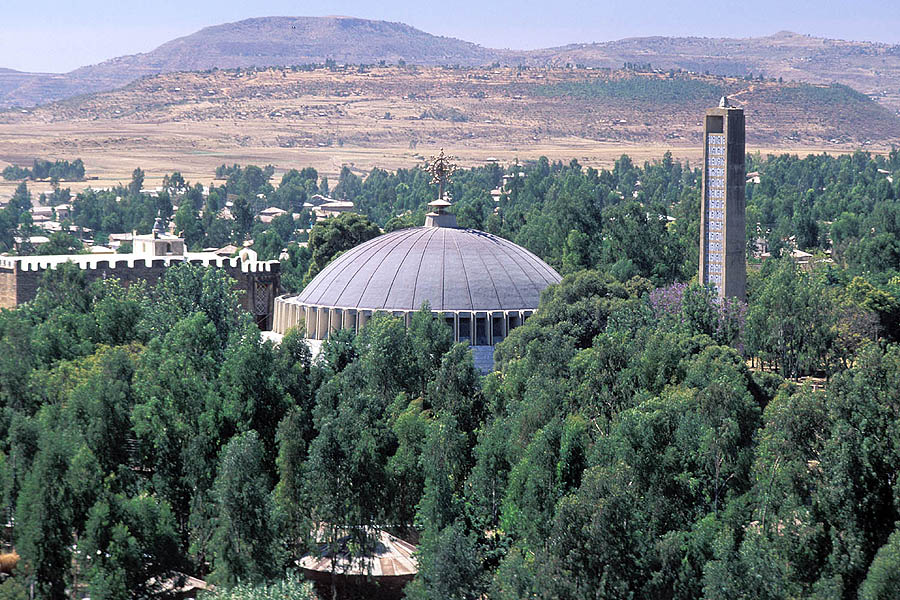
- Church of Our Lady Mary of Zion Cathedral in Axum, the seat of the Tigrayan Orthodox Tewahedo Church
- Abbreviation: TOTC
- Classification: Oriental Orthodox
- Orientation: Independent Oriental Orthodox, Orthodox Tewahedo
- Scripture: Orthodox Tewahedo Bible
- Theology: Miaphysitism
- Polity: Episcopal
- Primate: Vacant
- Region: Tigray and Tigrayan diaspora
- Headquarters: Church of Our Lady Mary of Zion, Axum, Tigray
- Founder: The Apostle and Evangelist Mark in 42 AD Alexandria, Saint Frumentius in 328 AD Axum (according to the Tigrayan Orthodox tradition)
- Independence: From the Ethiopian Orthodox Tewahedo Church in 2021. Not officially recognized in the broader Orthodox community.

The Tigrayan Orthodox Tewahedo Church is a schismatic church which broke away from the Oriental Orthodox communion on the 7th May 2021 due to bishops in Tigray being excommunicated for practising self-ordination among other priests. The archbishops of the Diocese of Tigray announced the establishment of the synod of the Tigray Orthodox Tewahedo Church on Wednesday, October 23, 2024, based on their previously codified “Church Law” after a three-day meeting from October 21 to 23, 2024.

Although the bishops attempted to declare autocephaly, the church has not been officially granted an autocephalous status from the officially recognized Oriental Orthodox Churches.

== History ==
=== Origins ===
Although it was excommunicated from the Oriental Orthodox Communion, the Tigrayan Orthodox Church derives its traditions and liturgical structure from the Ethiopian Orthodox Tewahedo Church.

Tewahedo (Ge'ez: ተዋሕዶ täwaḥədo) is a Ge'ez word meaning "being made one", cognate to Arabic tawhid.

According to the Catholic Encyclopedia (1917 edition) article on the Henoticon: around 500 bishops within the Patriarchates of Alexandria, Antioch and Jerusalem refused to accept the "two natures" doctrine decreed by the Council of Chalcedon in 451, thus separating themselves from the rest of Christianity since that time. This separate Christian communion came to be known as Oriental Orthodoxy. The Oriental Orthodox Churches, which today include the Coptic Orthodox Church of Alexandria, the Armenian Apostolic Church, the Syriac Orthodox Church, the Malankara Orthodox Syrian Church of India, the Ethiopian Orthodox Tewahedo Church, and the Eritrean Orthodox Tewahedo Church, are referred to as "Non-Chalcedonian". These churches themselves describe their Christology as miaphysite, but outsiders often describe them as monophysite.

=== 2021 – present ===
Following the Tigray war, four Archbishops in Tigray announced the formation of a new and independent structure on May 7, 2021, accusing the Ethiopian Orthodox Tewahdo Church of not opposing the war on Tigray, and of being too closely aligned with the perpetrators. Following the Tigray war, four Archbishops in Tigray announced the formation of a new and independent structure on May 7, 2021, named the autocephaly of the See of Selama Kessate Birhan, the High Administration of Tigray Orthodox Tewahedo Church. This was in response to allegations that the Ethiopian Orthodox Tewahdo Church had not appropriately opposed the war on Tigray and was too closely aligned with the war's perpetrators. They also alleged that the Synod did nothing to protect the churches and monasteries in Tigray from destruction and that they withheld financial support from the region. The Axum massacre in November 2020, when 100–800 civilians in Axum were killed by the Eritrean forces, was commonly cited as one example. The massacre was carried out in the center of Axum, near the Church of Our Lady of Zion, one of the most important holy sites in the Tigrayan Orthodox Tewahedo Church. The church was also looted and damaged.

The first formal communication between the two churches occurred in February 2023, when the Ethiopian Church released a letter in which they requested to talk to the Tigrayan church leaders about reconciliation. Rather than being addressed to the See of Selama Kessate Birhan, Patriarchate of the Tigray Orthodox Tewahedo Church, the letter was addressed to individual archbishops, which caused further irritation amongst the Tigray leaders, as the Ethiopian Church refused to acknowledge their institution.

Also in February 2023, the Tigrayan Church released its first liturgy book in Tigrinya and Ge'ez.

In March 2023, the General Synod of the Ethiopian Orthodox Tewahedo Church released a statement saying they would send a delegation to Tigray to attempt to repair the schism between the two churches. The Tigrayan church leaders rejected the statement, with some priests saying it did not include an apology for the Ethiopian Church's actions. That same month, the Tigrayan bishops appointed a bishop to oversee Tigrayan church members in the diaspora; this move was criticized by the Ethiopian Church.

On July 16, 2023, the Tigray Orthodox Tewahdo Church council nominated 10 episcopates five in Tigray and five abroad. Early in the month, the Ethiopian Church officially apologized for their lack of action during the war, but Tigrayan leaders did not express any interest in reconciling, with some criticizing the apology for not recognizing the full magnitude of the injustices committed during the war.

== Traditions ==
In common with all Eastern Orthodox, Oriental Orthodox, and Western Orthodox churches; the Catholic Church and the Old Catholic churches of the Union of Utrecht, the Tigrayan Orthodox Tewahedo Church professes belief in the seven sacraments of baptism, confirmation, eucharist, confession, the anointing of the sick, matrimony, and holy orders. It regards the first four as being "necessary for every believer".

=== Liturgical language ===
The traditional liturgical language of the Tigrayan Orthodox Tewahedo Church is Geʽez. This was the language of the early Aksumite Christians of the region. Though Geʽez no longer has native speakers, the language is still used for church liturgical functions and festivities. However, the sibket, or sermons, are normally given in the local Tigrinya language.

=== Biblical canon ===
The Tewahedo Church Biblical Canon contains 81 books, including almost all of those which are accepted by other Orthodox and Oriental Christians. The exception are the Books of the Maccabees, at least some of which are accepted in the Eastern Orthodox and other Oriental Orthodox churches, but not in the Tewahedo churches. The books of Meqabyan, which are accepted instead, have an etymologically connected name, but rather different content. The Tigrayana Orthodox canon, the Eritrean Orthodox canon, and the Ethiopian Orthodox canon are identical.

- The Narrower Canon also contains Enoch, Jubilees, and three books of the Meqabyan;
- The Broader Canon includes all of the books found in the Narrower Canon, as well as the two Books of the Covenant, Four Books of Sinodos, a Book of Clement, and Didascalia;

=== Similarities to Judaism and Islam ===
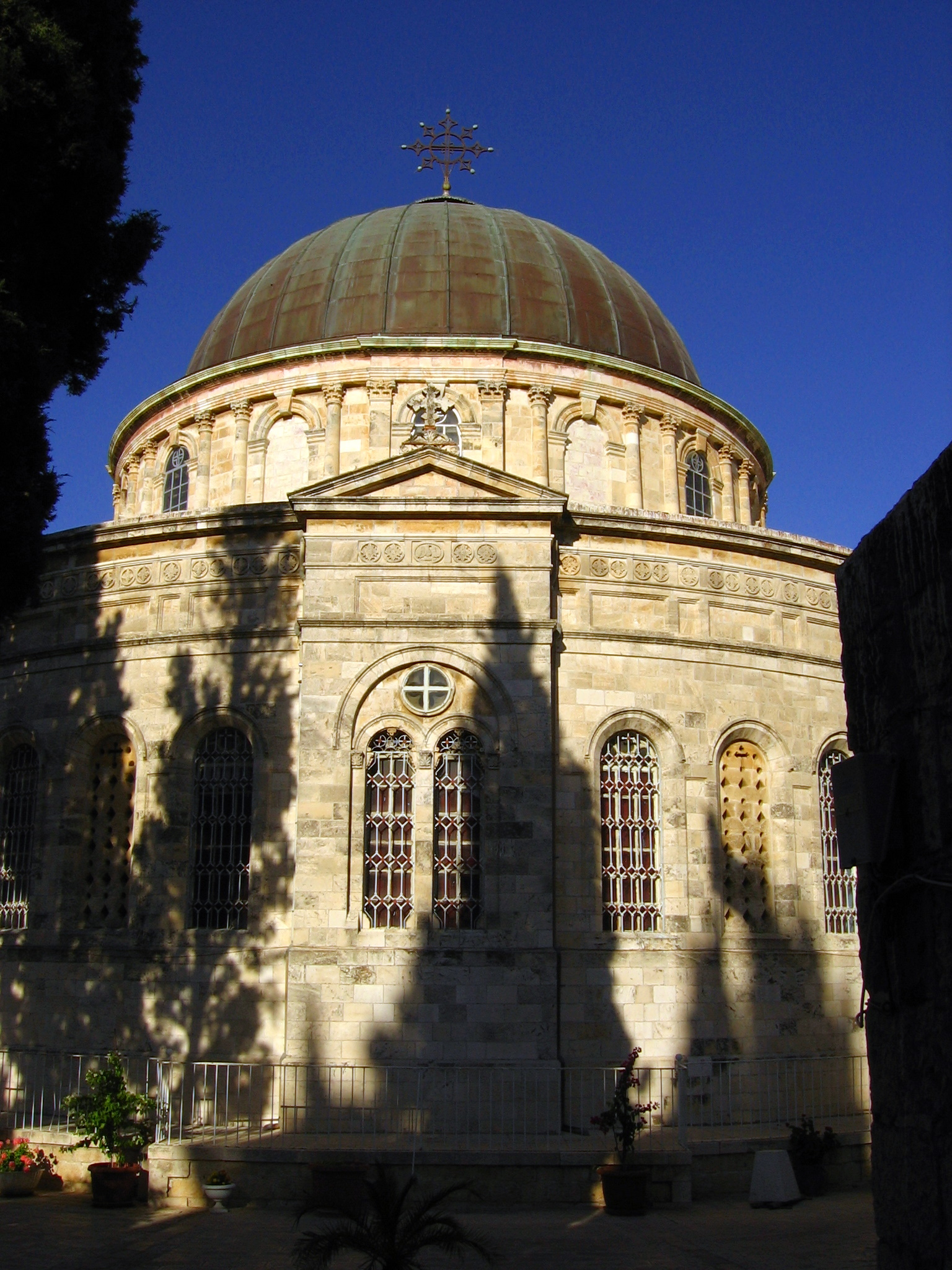
The Ethiopian Church, Jerusalem

The Ethiopian Church, places a heavier emphasis on Old Testament teachings than one might find in other churches. Women are prohibited from entering the church temple during menses; they are also expected to cover their hair with a large scarf (or shash) while in church, as described in 1 Corinthians, chapter 11. As with Orthodox synagogues, men and women sit separately in the Ethiopian church, with men on the left and women on the right (when facing the altar). (Women covering their heads and separation of the sexes in churches officially is common to few other Christian traditions; it is also the rule in some non-Christian religions, Islam and Orthodox Judaism among them).

Before praying, the Ethiopian Orthodox remove their shoes in order to acknowledge that one is offering prayer before a holy God. Ethiopian Orthodox worshippers remove their shoes when entering a church temple, in accordance with Exodus 3:5 (in which Moses, while viewing the burning bush, was commanded to remove his shoes while standing on holy ground). Furthermore, the Ethiopian Orthodox Tewahedo Church is known to observe the seventh-day Sabbath (Saturday, or the lesser Sabbath), in addition to the Lord's Day (Sunday, or the Christian Sabbath), recognizing both to be holy days of joy, prayer, and contemplation, although more emphasis, because of the Resurrection of Christ, is laid upon Sunday. While the Ethiopian Church is known for this practice, it is neither an innovation nor unique to it, deriving from the Apostolic Constitutions and the Apostolic Canons the former of which without the Apostolic Canons included is in the church's 81-book canon as the Didascalia. The nature of the Sabbath only became a doctrinal dispute in the Coptic Orthodox Church of Alexandria in the centuries leading up to the issue being rectified by Ewostatewos. The emperor Gelawdewos in his Confession, an apologia of traditional beliefs and practices says "we do not honour it as the Jews do... but we so honour it that we celebrate thereon the Eucharist and have love-feasts, even as our Fathers the Apostles have taught us in the Didascalia".

The Ethiopian Church does not call for circumcision, yet it is a cultural practice, as is abstention from pork and other meats deemed unclean. It is not regarded as being necessary to salvation. The liturgy mentions, "let us not be circumcised like the Jews."

The Ethiopian Orthodox Church observes days of ritual purification. People who are ritually unclean may approach the church but are not permitted to enter it; they instead stand near the church door and pray during the liturgy.

Rugare Rukuni and Erna Oliver identify the Nine Saints as Jewish Christians, and attribute the Judaic character of Ethiopian Christianity, in part, to their influence.

=== Women in the Church ===
Women are prohibited from entering Tigrayan church temples during menses; they are also expected to cover their hair with a large scarf (or a shash) while they are in church, as described in 1 Corinthians, chapter 11.

== Patriarchs, abunas and bishops of Tigray ==
In summer 2023, the church had four archbishops;

- Archbishops of Mekelle Abune Isayas
- Archbishops of Adigrat Abune Merhakirstos
- Archbishops of Shire Abune Petros
- Archbishops of Axum Abune Mekarios

=== List of bishops ===
The leaders of the Tigray Orthodox Tewahdo Church's See of Selama Kesate Birhan elected ten candidates as bishops on July 16, 2023. The new bishops will lead dioceses both in the Tigray region and abroad.

- Abba ZeSelassie Markos
- Abba Haile Michael Aregai
- Abba Estifanos Gebre Giorgis
- Abba Mehari Habte (Nibure Id)
- Abba Elias Gebre Kidan
- Abba ZeraDawit Brehane
- Abba Yemanebrihan Welde Samuel
- Abba Tsegegenet Kidane Welde
- Abba Sereqebrihan Welde Samuel
- Abba Yohannes Kebede

== See also ==
- 2023 Ethiopian Orthodox Tewahedo Church crisis
- Christian observances of Jewish holidays
- Eritrean Orthodox Tewahedo Church
- Ethiopian Orthodox Tewahedo Church
- Judaizers
- List of calendar of saints in the Orthodox Tewahedo
- Oriental Orthodox Christianity

== Sources ==
- Binns, John (2016). The Orthodox Church of Ethiopia: A History. Tauris. ISBN 978-1784536954.
- Meyendorff, John (1989). Imperial unity and Christian divisions: The Church 450-680 A.D. Crestwood, NY: St. Vladimir's Seminary Press. ISBN 9780881410563.
