= Stephanites =

Ethiopian Orthodox monastic movement in the 15th-16th century

The Stephanites (Note: Ge'ez: ደቂቀ ኤስጢፋኖስ, romanized: Däḳīḳä ʾĒsṭīfānōs, lit. 'Children (Disciples) of Abba Estifanos') were a 15th–16th century monastic reform current within the Ethiopian Orthodox Tewahedo Church, centred on the monastery of Gunda Gunde in Tigray. Founded by the monk Abba Estifanos (d. c. 1450), the movement was marked by strict biblicism, rejection of certain royal and ecclesiastical practices, and an emphasis on the autonomy of monastic communities. It faced severe repression under Emperor Zär’a Yaʿqob (r. 1434–1468) and his successors, yet its network of affiliated monasteries endured for centuries. An indirect connection has sometimes been postulated between the movement and the later P'ent'ay movement that arose under the influence of Western Christian, specifically Protestant missionaries in the 19th century.

== Origins and principles ==
The Stephanites emerged in the late reign of Emperor Dawit I or his immediate successor, consolidating during Zär’a Yaʿqob’s rule. They rejected practices they considered unscriptural, including prostration before the emperor, veneration of the cross and of Mary beyond what they deemed biblical, and participation in royal cult rituals. Worship, they held, should be directed to God alone.

The Stephanites’ theology combined Ethiopian Orthodox liturgical heritage with a radical return to biblical authority. They resisted the synthesis of imperial power and church hierarchy, holding that spiritual authority rested in Scripture and in the collective discernment of monastic councils, not the crown. In their doctrinal works, they emphasised literal obedience to the Ten Commandments, rejection of human interpretations and an interpretation of Christology that stressed Christ’s kingship over all earthly rulers.

Education was central to Stephanite life. Monasteries served as centres for the teaching of Ge'ez, biblical exegesis, hymnography, and moral instruction. Instruction often began before dawn with readings from the Psalms, followed by interpretive discussions in which novices were encouraged to question and debate points of doctrine. Senior monks also trained disciples in calligraphy, manuscript illumination, and the composition of liturgical poetry (qəne). This intellectual culture reinforced the legitimacy of dissent when imperial decrees were judged contrary to Scripture.

In their theological writings, they often employed Geʿez terms such as ʾEgziʾabhēr (“Lord of the Universe”) and ʾAmlek (“the King”) in direct address to God, avoiding titles they felt implied undue mediation by saints or rulers. The movement also promoted a theology stressing the distinct personhood of the Trinity, which their opponents accused of tritheism.

Stephanite monasteries produced their own liturgical works and maintained independence from state interference. Their refusal to conform led to accusations of heresy and even branding as "Jews" (ayhud), a polemical label used in medieval Ethiopia for various dissident groups.

== Conflict and persecution ==
From the 1430s, the Emperor Zär’a Yaʿqob initiated sustained campaigns against the Stephanites to enforce religious uniformity. Leaders were imprisoned, tortured, or executed; monasteries were confiscated or destroyed; and members were exiled to remote provinces. Hagiographic works, including the Gädlä Abäw w-a ʾAhaw zä-Däbrä Garzen, commemorate monks martyred during this period.

The Gädlä Abba Estifanos records that he and his companions were chained in iron collars and deprived of food for refusing to bow to the emperor. Zär’a Yaʿqob’s own royal chronicle accuses the Stephanites of “breaking the unity of the faith” and “dishonouring the cross.” Imperial governors in Tigray and Amhara were ordered to arrest suspected members, and nobles who offered sanctuary risked losing their lands.

The second leader, Abba Abäkärazun (d. 1476), and his successor Abba Gäbrä Mäsih (c. 1419–1522), continued to resist imperial authority. Gäbrä Mäsih’s gädl recounts assistance from members of the Beta Israel, a notable detail given the movement’s own accusations of Judaizing.

=== Relations with other groups ===
The Stephanites came into conflict not only with the imperial court but also with other monastic reform currents, such as the Ewothathians, who promoted different reforms. While both resisted certain imperial interventions, theological and disciplinary differences limited collaboration.

== Later history ==
After the mid-16th century, direct persecution declined, and the Stephanite network adapted into a looser confederation of monasteries. Branch monasteries such as Gunda Gunde, Däbrä Qwesqwam, Däbrä Bizän, and Däbrä Ṣägäd preserved elements of Stephanite teaching while integrating into the wider Orthodox monastic world. Economic adaptation included reliance on agricultural estates, local donations, and the production of manuscripts for sale or commission. Some monasteries maintained ties with Muslim merchants along the Red Sea trade routes, exchanging parchment, incense, and grain.

While the movement’s distinct identity gradually faded, its ethos of monastic autonomy influenced later debates over church–state relations in Ethiopia.

== Legacy ==
Modern scholarship has reassessed the Stephanites as both a theological reform movement and a political challenge to centralized imperial authority. Ethiopian intellectuals have drawn parallels between Stephanite resistance to Zär’a Yaʿqob and later struggles for freedom of conscience.

In popular and diaspora discourse, particularly among Tigrayans, the movement has been remembered as a symbol of spiritual and political resistance. Articles in Tigray Liberty Media and Tghat portray the Stephanites as early defenders of human dignity against authoritarianism, linking their legacy to modern struggles in the Tigray War. Their monasteries, especially Gunda Gunde, remain sites of pilgrimage and Stephanite manuscript preservation, contributing to the study of Ethiopian Christian history. These texts, preserved by the Ethiopian Orthodox Church and in foreign collections, contribute significantly to the study of Ethiopian Christian history.

== Further readings ==
- Mesfin Shuge, "Biography of 'Hadege Anbesa' (Abba Stephanos) of the Orthodox Church," term paper, Ethiopian Graduate School of Theology (EGST), Addis Ababa (May 2001).
- Steven Kaplan, Monastic Holy Man and the Christianization of Early Solomonic Ethiopia (Wiesbaden: Franz Steiner, 1984), pp. 41–44.
- Dr. Dirshaye Menberu, "Abba Estifanos (Hadege Anbesa)" Dictionary of African Christian Biography, http://www.dacb.org/stories/ethiopia/estifanos_.html (2005)
- Dr. Getatchew Haile (translator), The Ge'ez Acts of Abba Estifanos of Gwendagwende (2006)
- https://www.youtube.com/watch?v=EdGwhsh9pTg
