= Gunda Gunde Monastery =

Ethiopian Orthodox Tewahedo monastery in Tigray Region, Ethiopia

Coordinates: 14°22′58″N 39°44′07″E

Gunda Gunde

Religion
- Affiliation: Ethiopian Orthodox Tewahedo Church
- Region: Tigray Region
- Ecclesiastical or organisational status: Monastery
- Status: Active

Location
- Location: Misraqawi Zone, Ethiopia
- Interactive map of Gunda Gunde

Architecture
- Type: church
- Groundbreaking: 14th-15th century

Gunda Gunde Monastery (Tigrinya: ገዳም ጉንዳ ጉንዶ Gädam gunida gunido) is an Ethiopian Orthodox Tewahedo monastery located east of Adigrat in the Misraqawi (Eastern) Zone of the northern Tigray Region in Ethiopia. It is known for its prolific scriptorium, as well as its library of Geʽez manuscripts. This collection of over 220 volumes, all but one dating from before the 16th century, is one of the largest collections of its kind in Ethiopia.

== History ==
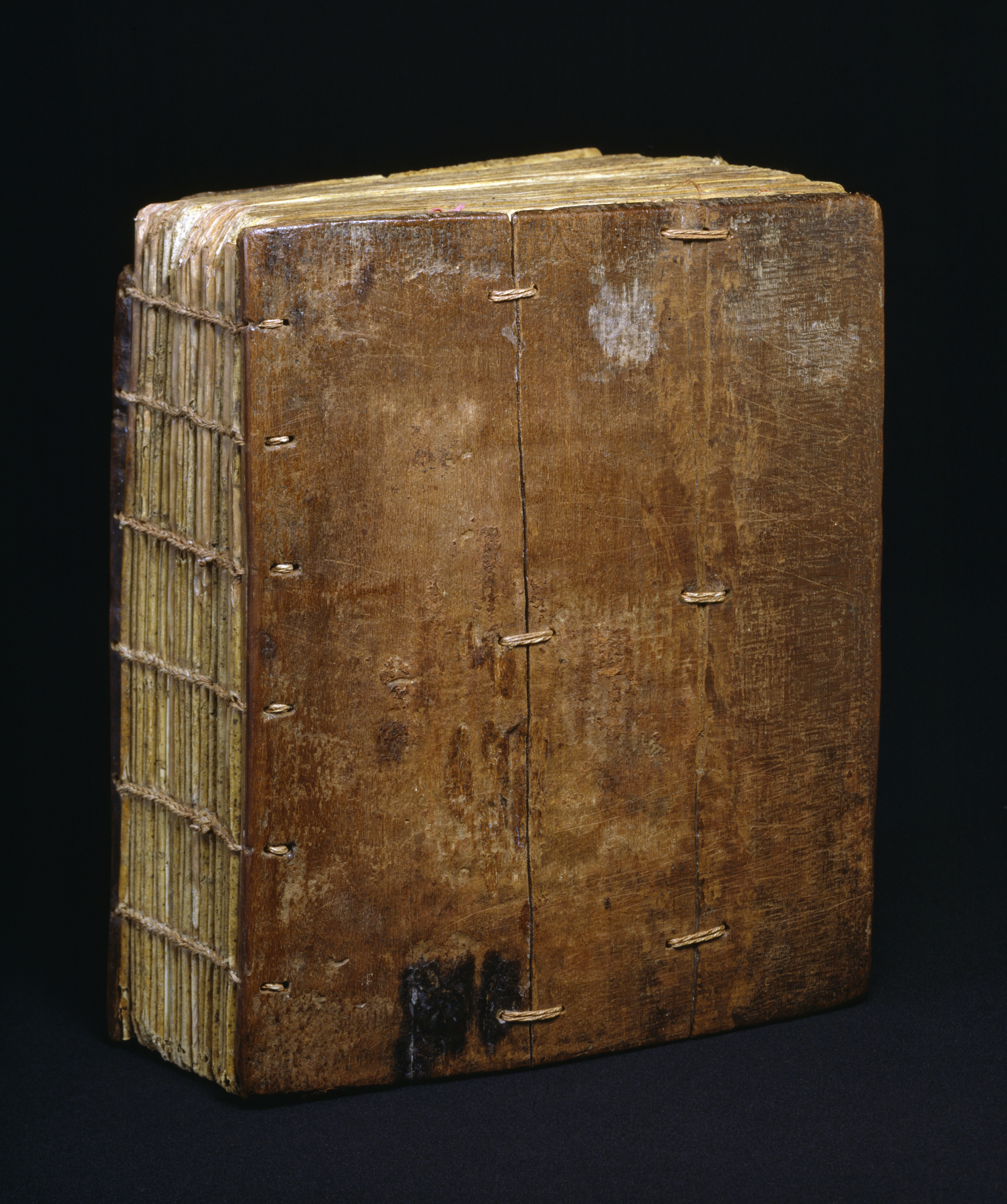
Gunda Gunde Gospels, parchment bound between wooden boards covered with remains of leather, c.1540, (Stephanites), Walters Art Museum

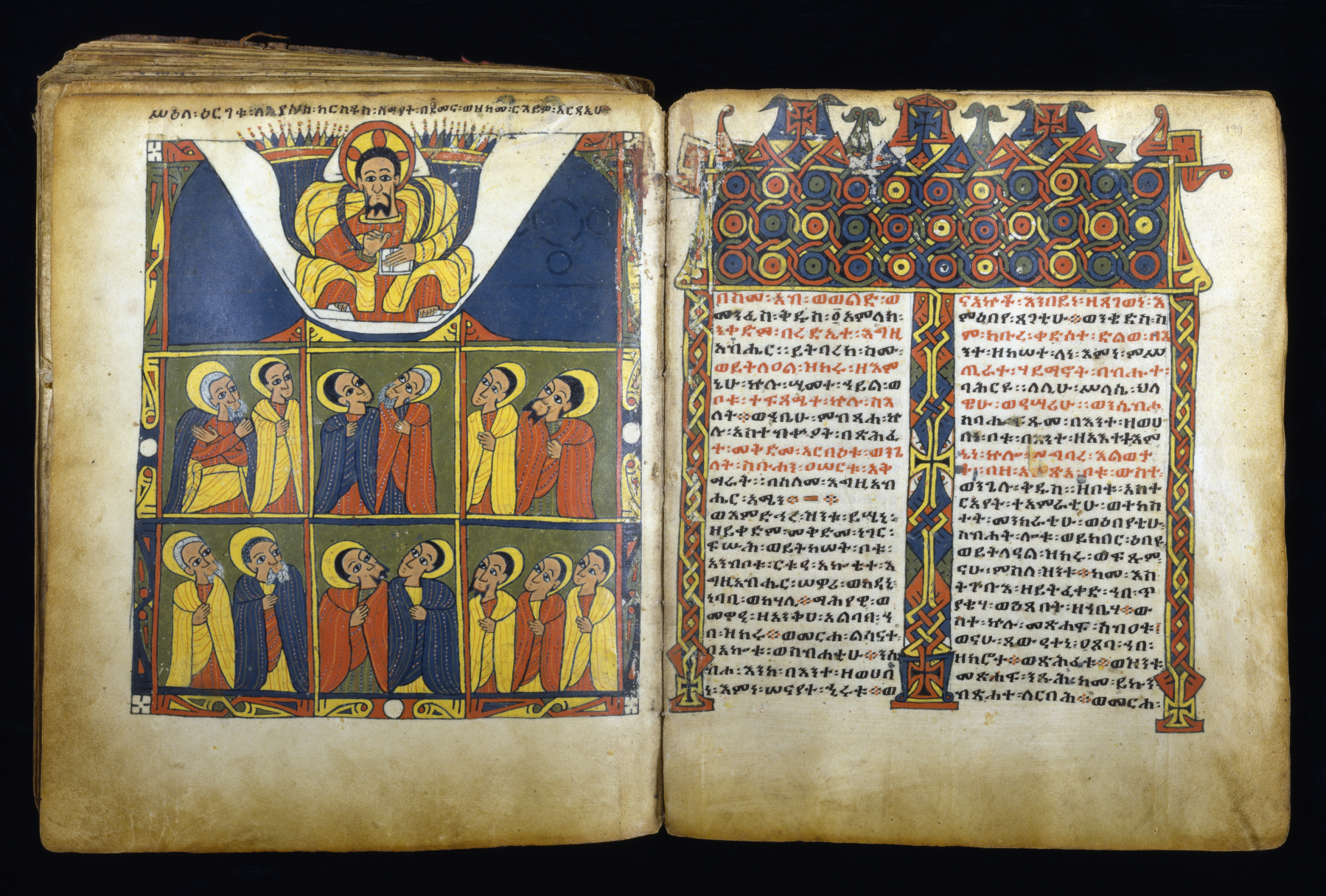
Leaf from the Gunda Gunde Gospels, Walters Art Museum

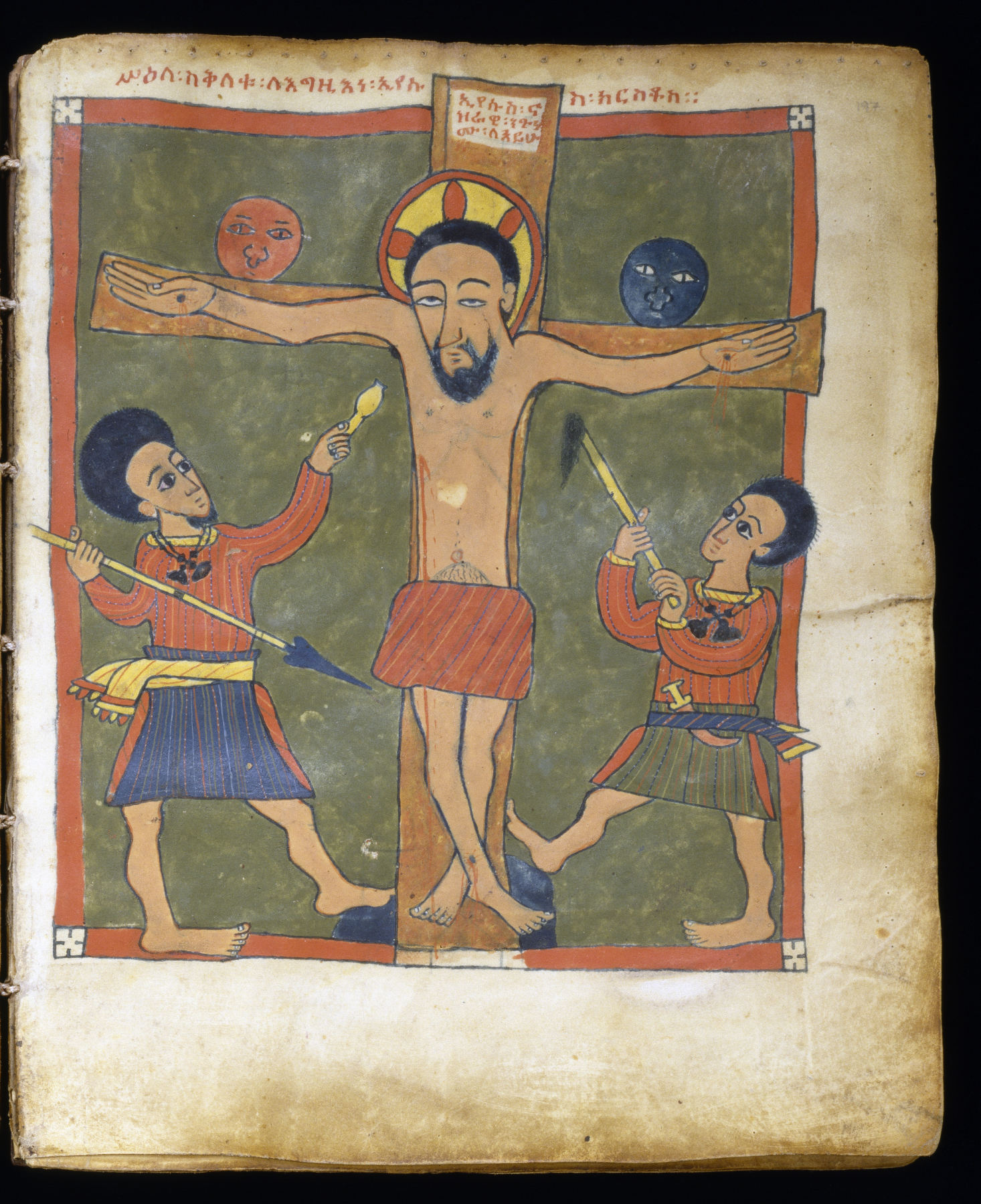
A manuscript leaf decorated with a scene of Christ after being wounded by the Holy Lance

Gunda Gunde was founded by followers of Saint Estifanos seeking a refuge from the persecutions of their beliefs in the late 14th and early 15th centuries, finding it in the remote region of the modern Irob woreda. According to a tradition recorded by Justin de Jacobis, the monastery was built on a crater where a dragon named Gabella dwelled, which was appeased with the periodic sacrifice of young women until the monks' prayers tamed it.

The remoteness of the monastery attracted other groups at odds with the mainstream Ethiopian Orthodox Tewahedo Church. One of these dissidents were the Stephanites, who were accused of failing to venerate the cross and the Virgin Mary; Gebre Masih, abbot between 1475/1476 until his death around 1520, was one Stephanite, while another was Ezra, a monk belonging to Gunda Gunde. Its remoteness also saved Gunda Gunde from the 16th century ravages of the Muslim assault by the forces of Imam Ahmad Gragn, which had plundered or destroyed many churches and other centers of Ethiopian Christianity.

When Mgr. de Jacobis visited Gunda Gunde in the 1840s, the internal disorder of the Ethiopian Church had made it receptive to his missionary work: several monks converted to Catholicism, and its abbot Walda Giyorgis (died 1850) was openly pro-Catholic. The community's support led to the establishment of the first modern Catholic parish at Gwala, one of the fiefs of the monastery. The monastery's support of Catholicism came to an end with Walda Giyorgis' death and the election of a new abbot.

The next notable European visit was by the Italian scholar, Antonio Mordini, who visited the monastery more than once in 1940. However, he did not publish an account of his visit until 1954. Several years later Beatrice Playne, excited at the prospect of finding a religious site that had avoided Ahmad Gragn's attention, visited the monastery in 1948. After travelling for two days across several roadless mountain ranges, she found Gunda Gunde in a narrow valley with "cultivated gardens on either bank... irrigated by a careful system of wooden, trough-like pipes and primitive aqueducts". Unable to enter the compound due to her gender (Ethiopian tradition forbids women from entering monastery grounds), she had to be content with having the monks bring out selections of ancient manuscripts from its library and paintings from its church.

Just as its remoteness had discouraged Imam Ahmad from visiting, so the Derg likewise failed to impose their authority on this distant corner of Ethiopia – although the Tigray People's Liberation Front reportedly held a field conference at Gunda Gunde in the late 1980s.

== Compound ==
The buildings of Gunda Gunde include a numerous buildings intended to house the establishment's monks, built "of flat stones without mortar with roofs held up by huge logs darkened by the smoke and wear of centuries". In the middle stands a large, rectangular church which Henze speculated dated to the foundation of the monastery. Mordini measured the walls of the church, and reported its facade was 13.48 meters wide, the length of its left and right outer walls as 18.7 and 17.65 meters respectively, and rear wall as 14.9 meters wide. Henze describes its outer walls as consisting "of neatly laid flat tannish stone which has a bit of clay as mortar. They do not give the impression of ever having been rigidly regular. At several places there has been a moderate degree of subsidence which has caused cracks, never very wide, and there is occasional evidence of repairs. Between the outer and inner walls there is a passage about 1-1/2 m. wide." He was unable to determine whether this passage extends completely around the inner square structure of the church.

Following Ruth Playne's visit, a church dedicated to Saint Tekle Haymanot was erected outside the monastery for the convenience of women who had come to the monastery to observe religious holidays. Henze was told it had been endowed by Emperor Haile Selassie.

Another important monastic building is the eqabet or treasury, which Henze describes as a small, rectangular building built in the 20th century with mortared walls and a tin roof. This building contains the monastic library.

== Library ==
When de Jacobis was shown the monastic library at Gunda Gunde, he was told it held "the largest known collection of Abyssinian works." Although the collection of the monastic library remains an important collection, larger ones have been created since then. Those in Ethiopia include the manuscript collection of the Institute of Ethiopian Studies with as many as 2,000 volumes, and the National Archives and Library of Ethiopia with 880 volumes. Large collections of Geʽez manuscripts exist in the British Library (more than 598 manuscripts), the Bibliothèque nationale in Paris (688 manuscripts), and at Princeton University (325 manuscripts).
