= Abba Estifanos =

Ethiopian monk in the 15th century

Abba ʼEsṭifānos
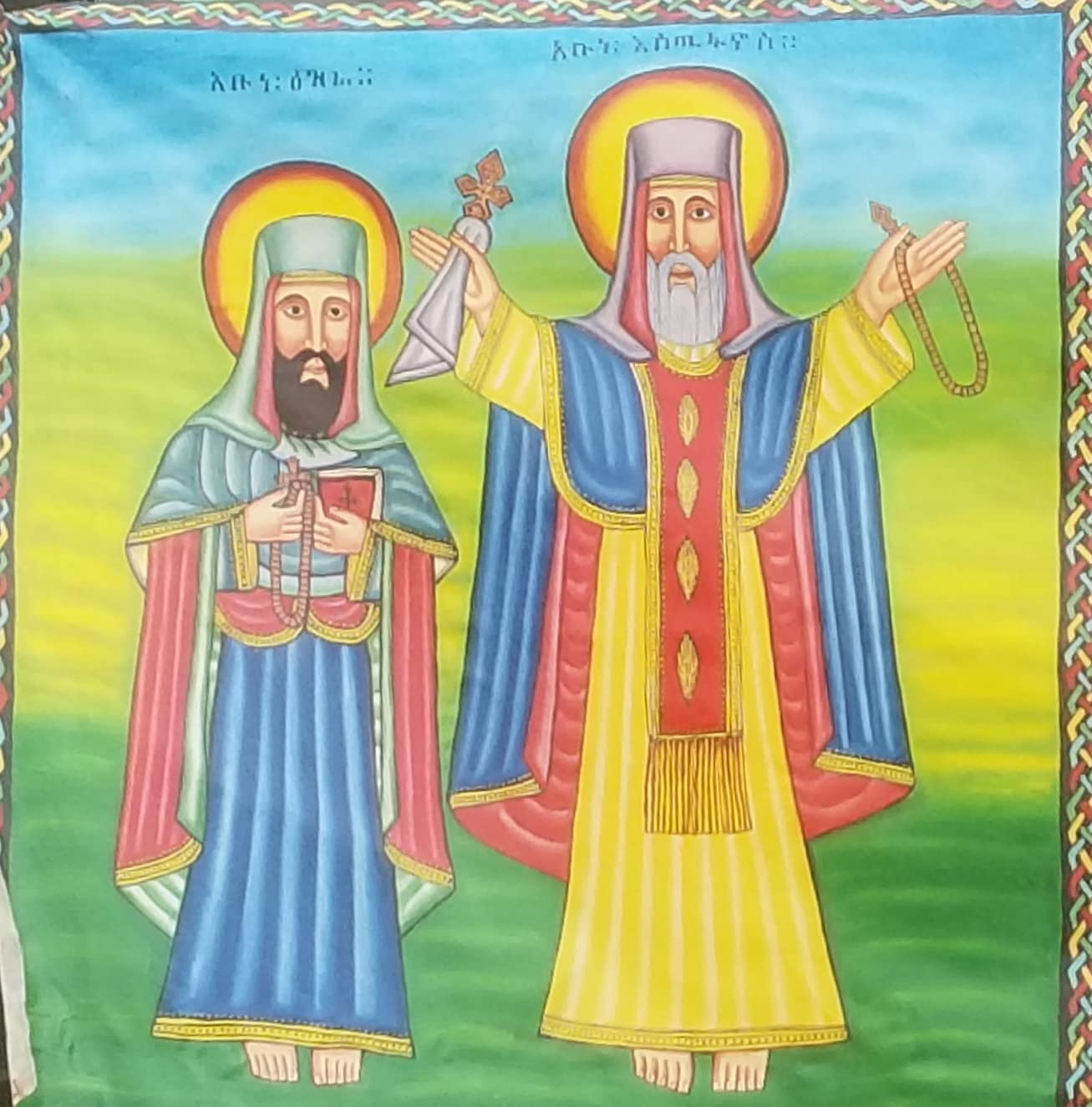
- Depiction of Abba Estifanos (holding the cross and the mequteria) blessing his follower Abba Ezra of Shire
- Born: 1380/1394; Agame, Tigray Province, Ethiopian Empire
- Died: 1450s Wegera, Ethiopian Empire
- Theological work
- Era: 15th century
- Tradition or movement: Stephanite
- Notable ideas: Biblical literalism, opposition to iconolatry, veneration of Mary and the intercession of the saints

Abba ʼEsṭifānos of Gunda Gunde (Ge'ez: አባ እስጢፋኖስ, c. 1380-1394 – c. 1450s) was a prominent 15th-century Ethiopian Christian monk, religious reformer and martyr from Tigray. Founder of the Stephanite movement, (Note: In Geʿez: Ge'ez: ደቂቀ ኤስጢፋኖስ, romanized: Däḳīḳä ʾĒsṭīfānōs, lit. 'Children (Disciples) of Stephen') he is one of the most controversial religious figures in late medieval Ethiopian Christianity. Active during the reign of Emperor Zara Yaqob (r. 1434–1468), Estifanos is known for his strict asceticism, his rejection of certain widespread religious practices, and his unwavering emphasis on Scripture over ecclesiastical tradition. Though condemned as a heretic by imperial and clerical authorities, he attracted a dedicated following and left behind a body of teachings preserved in his Geʽez hagiography, the Acts of Abba Estifanos. (Note: In Geʿez: Ge'ez: ገድላ አባ እስጢፋኖስ, romanized: Gädlä Abbā ʾEstifānos) An indirect connection has sometimes been postulated between his teachings and the later P'ent'ay movement that arose under the influence of Western Christian, specifically Protestant missionaries in the 19th century.

Long after his death, he remains a controversial yet influential figure in Ethiopian religious history and his ideas have remained the subject of both theological dispute and historical interest within and beyond Ethiopia.

== Early life ==
Abba Estifanos was born in 1394, in a village called Merwa, within the province of Agame, in modern-day Tigray. His birth name was Ḥādege ʾAnbäsā (Ge'ez: ሓደገ አንበሳ, "reminiscent of a lion"). Although specific details about his early life are sparse, Estifanos is thought to have belonged to a family of local chiefs, serving under the Solomonic dynasty. His father, Bǝrhāne Mäsqäl (Ge'ez: ብርሃነ መስቀል, "Light of the Cross") was a military figure who died before Estifanos was born. As a result, he was raised by his maternal uncle, the chief of Gifmala, who assumed guardianship of the child and directed his education and upbringing.

According to the Geʽez hagiographic source known as the Acts of Abba Estifanos (Ge'ez: ገድላ አባ እስጢፋኖስ, romanized: Gädlä Abbā ʾEstifānos), his birth was preceded by a vow made by his mother. Having been childless, she prayed for a son and promised to dedicate him to the service of God under the protection of Archangel Gabriel.

The family expected Estifanos to inherit a military and administrative role, as was customary for young men of his lineage. In this rural aristocratic context, boys of his class were expected to master horsemanship, weapons handling, and tribute collection, while observing loyalty to the reigning Solomonic dynasty. Unlike his peers, he avoided games, feasting, and idle conversation. His relatives considered him strange and overly austere. The tension between his ascetic inclinations and his family's expectations grew more severe in adolescence. His uncle, determined to make him a soldier, resisted any involvement with religious life, reportedly accusing Estifanos of bringing dishonor to the household by pursuing a beggar's path.

Nevertheless, his spiritual aspirations and his desire to renounce worldly life intensified with age. Against the wishes of his mother and relatives, Estifanos fled the household to pursue ecclesiastical training. He joined a nearby liturgical school (aqwaqwam bet), where he immersed himself in the study of Geʽez, the liturgical language of the Ethiopian Orthodox Tewahedo Church, along with the memorization of the Psalms and rudimentary biblical exegesis and church chant. According to the Acts, he surpassed his fellow students in both moral conduct and scholastic ability, becoming a model of youthful monastic virtue.

During this time, Estifanos reportedly experienced a series of visionary revelations. In one such account, he saw a blinding light and heard a divine voice urging him to “renounce the world” and live in purity, far from “the idolatry of men”. By the time he reached young adulthood, he had already rejected noble privilege and embraced a life of renunciation. These formative choices foreshadowed the ideological confrontations he would later stage against the imperial church, its rituals, and its entanglement with state power.

== Career ==
After several years of rigorous ascetic practice and study, Estifanos formally entered the monastic life at the monastery of Däbrä Qoyetsa in eastern Tigray, where he became a disciple of the revered monastic elder Abba Samuel of Qoyetsa. Prior to this, however, Estifanos had already been ordained as a deacon at the age of 18 by Abuna Bartalomewos, the Coptic-appointed Metropolitan overseeing the Ethiopian Orthodox Tewahedo Church. This early ordination followed his completion of liturgical studies and signified his official entry into clerical life.

Upon taking full monastic vows at Qoyetsa, he was renamed Abbā Estifanos (Stephen), in reference to the first Christian martyr. He remained there for over a decade, receiving further formation in theology and ascetic discipline. At the age of 30, he was ordained as a priest, again by Abuna Bartalomewos, marking his progression into the higher echelons of ecclesiastical service.

Despite his formal integration into the Church, Estifanos became increasingly disillusioned with what he perceived as widespread deviations from the Scriptures. Even during his monastic training, he had harbored doubts about the spiritual efficacy of ecclesiastical practices centered on outward ritual rather than inward transformation. His discontent intensified as he witnessed what he believed to be the excessive veneration of icons, crosses, saints, and the Virgin Mary, alongside the formalism of liturgical life in both monasteries and parish communities. He began to associate these practices with a form of idolatry, increasingly aligning his theology with an emerging call to return to what he regarded as biblical purity and spiritual sincerity.

Seeking greater spiritual fulfillment, he withdrew for periods of solitary reflection and embarked on extended travels across the northern highlands—visiting churches, hermitages, and remote monasteries often praying in caves or open landscapes, meditating in forests—hoping to encounter teachers or communities that embodied a more authentic Christian ethos.

During these travels, Estifanos encountered Abba Gebre Nazrawi, a mystic whose teachings emphasized strict sola scriptura adherence, rejection of saintly intercession, and opposition to the veneration of the cross, icons, and Mary. Deeply influenced by this theology, Estifanos began to develop a more systematic critique of the established church, which he saw as compromised by paganism, feudalism, and imperial ritualism. Around this time, he began publicly preaching that salvation could only be found through direct obedience to the Bible, not through sacraments, relics, or church traditions. He rejected bowing before the cross, kissing icons, or invoking saints—practices he now considered idolatrous.

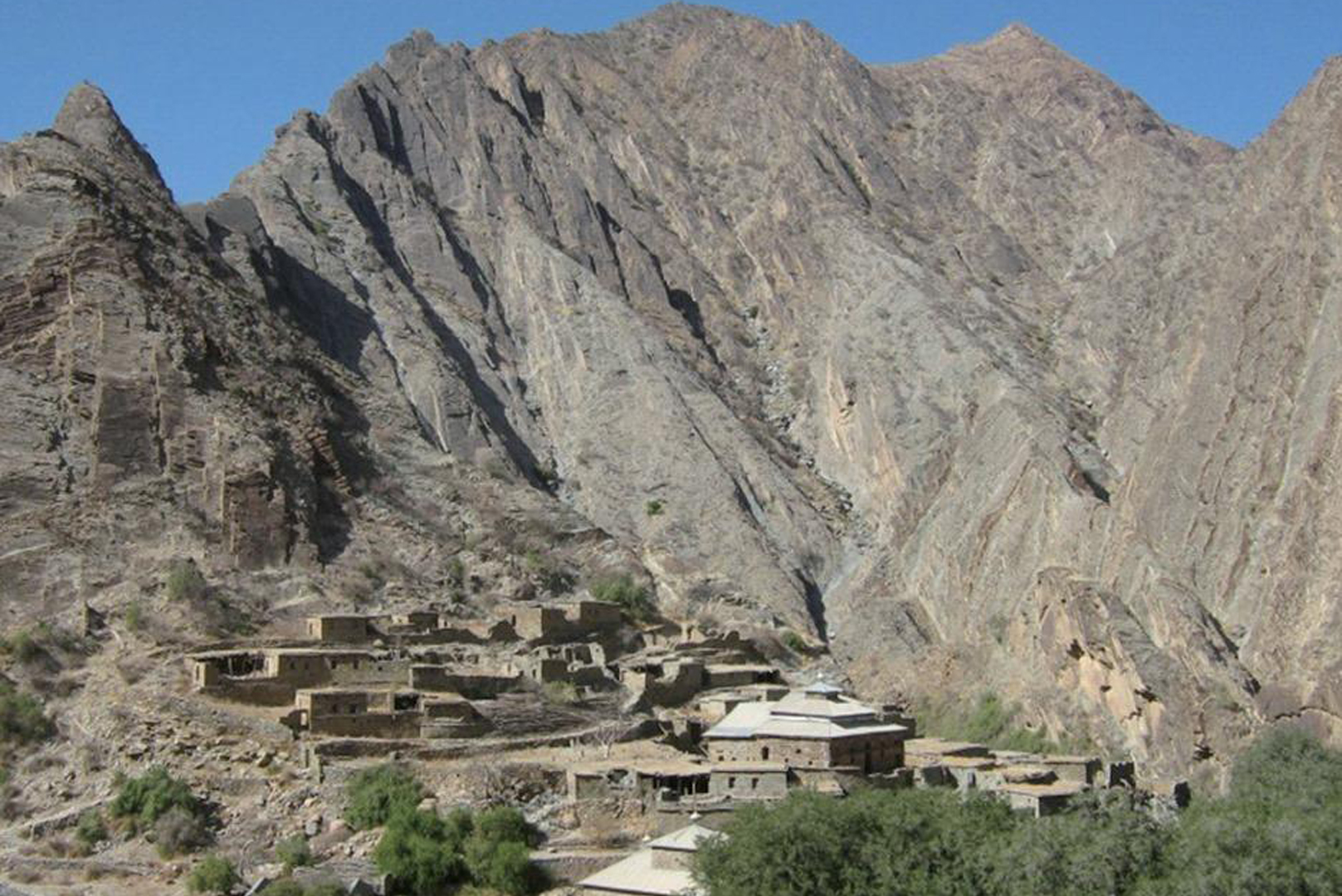
Picture of the Gunda Gunde Monastery (below), Irob, Tigray

Estifanos gradually attracted a core group of disciples who admired his radical commitment to scripture, his tireless asceticism, and his rejection of ecclesiastical hierarchy. Chief among these early followers were Gabra Masih, Abba Gabra Egzi’abeher, Ezra of Shire, and others who would later become key leaders in the Stephanite movement. He settled in the village of Gunda Gunde (also written Gwendagwende), located near the Eritrean border in modern-day southeastern Tigray, and made it the base of his teaching activity. There, he and his followers began to establish an independent community that followed a strict monastic rule based on the Bible alone, shunning imperial holidays, public processions, and all material symbols of power.

The movement's break with the Ethiopian Orthodox Church grew sharper as Estifanos and his followers publicly refused to bow to the Cross, an act that brought accusations of heresy. Around 1430, Estifanos was summoned by the local ecclesiastical authorities to justify his teachings. Instead, he challenged their authority, insisting that obedience to Scripture must take precedence over church tradition or institutional power. According to the Acts, he refused to recant and continued to preach openly, which drew the attention of the imperial court.

His movement soon came into direct conflict with the court of Emperor Zara Yaqob, who viewed Estifanos’ rejection of imperial rites and church rituals as a threat to both religious unity and political order. Estifanos was first arrested in Aksum, later released, and then subjected to multiple rounds of interrogation and public humiliation over the following years. Despite imprisonment and beatings, he refused to disavow his teachings. His sermons continued to spread across northern Ethiopia, reaching parts of Tembien, Wag, and Semien, where other Stephanite communities began to form.

== Teachings ==
Abba Estifanos’ teachings represented a radical departure from the established doctrine of the Ethiopian Orthodox Tewahedo Church and sparked one of the most serious theological crises in late medieval Ethiopian Christianity. His reforms centered on a call to return to the exclusive authority of Scripture (particularly the Old Testament and Gospels), and the elimination of practices he deemed unscriptural or idolatrous.

At the heart of his doctrine was a fierce rejection of the veneration of the cross, icons, saints, and even of the Virgin Mary, whom he regarded as a “mere vessel” for the Incarnation of Christ. He taught that Christians should not bow to crosses, kiss icons, or invoke saints for intercession, because such actions lacked biblical support and diverted worship away from God alone.

Estifanos also rejected various liturgical feasts, processions, and imperial religious festivals—especially those associated with royal ideology and Saint Mary. He argued that only the Sabbath and the Lord's Day should be observed, and that the multiplicity of feasts corrupted the original Christian calendar. He opposed the widespread use of incense, bells, and relics, and believed that salvation could not be mediated by church offices or sacraments (a notion later conceptualised in the West as Solus Christus) but only by personal faith and obedience to the divine commandments.

This strict adherence to Scriptures led the Stephanites to adopt highly ascetic lifestyles. They fasted rigorously, rejected luxurious garments, refused to swear oaths except directly to God, and refused to pay homage to any earthly symbols of power—including the cross, edicts, and even imperial decrees bearing the name of the Emperor. They denounced clergy who did not live in strict accordance with biblical mandates and were known for disrupting church processions and refusing to participate in Orthodox services they deemed idolatrous.

=== Controversy with Emperor Zara Yaqob ===
The conflict between Abba Estifanos and Emperor Zara Yaqob (r. 1434–1468) formed the most dramatic chapter in his life and in the development of the Stephanite movement. Zara Yaqob, who sought to consolidate religious orthodoxy and imperial authority, had institutionalized the veneration of the Virgin Mary and the Cross as doctrinal pillars of the Ethiopian Orthodox Tewahedo Church. Estifanos' public rejection of these practices was interpreted not only as heresy but also as a political provocation against the very legitimacy of the Solomonic dynasty.

Abba Estifanos was summoned to the imperial court multiple times, where he was subjected to interrogation by both ecclesiastical authorities and the emperor's officials. One of the most defining confrontations occurred during a trial in which Estifanos refused to bow before the imperial processional cross. Instead, he offered a theologically charged reply:

“I do not bow to the cross made by the hands of men, for it is wood like any other tree. I bow to the one who was nailed upon it, who died, and who rose from the dead and is now glorified in the heavens. Why should I give honor to the object of his suffering, when He has commanded us not to worship the works of our hands?”
— *Geʽez Acts of Abba Estifanos*, trans. Getatchew Haile, 2006, p. 63

When clergy demanded to know why he opposed this ancient practice, Estifanos responded with an appeal to Scripture over tradition:

“You ask why I do not bow to the cross, yet you do not ask why the Apostles themselves did not command this. Was it not Christ himself who said: ‘God is Spirit, and those who worship Him must worship in spirit and in truth’? (Note: John 4:24 — “God is spirit, and those who worship him must worship in spirit and truth.”) If we obey the Scriptures, we do not need to add the customs of men.”
— *Geʽez Acts of Abba Estifanos*, trans. Getatchew Haile, 2006, pp. 64–65

Such statements antagonized Zara Yaqob, who had decreed strict religious conformity as a tool of imperial consolidation. Estifanos' teachings undermined both the theological legitimacy of the imperial order and the authority of the institutional church. As a result, he was arrested, imprisoned, publicly flogged, and exiled to distant locations such as Aksum, Wegera and Amba Sel under military surveillance.

Zara Yaqob issued several edicts that criminalized the practices of the Stephanites. His persecution included burning their writings, prohibiting others from associating with them, and requiring all subjects to bow before the cross as a test of orthodoxy. Many of Estifanos’ disciples, such as Gabra Masih and Ezra of Shire, were tortured, mutilated, or martyred for refusing to recant their beliefs.

== Later life and death ==
Following years of escalating tensions with both church and state authorities, Abba Estifanos spent the final period of his life under prolonged detention, harsh surveillance, and increasing isolation. After multiple public trials and persistent refusal to submit to imperial orthodoxy, he was eventually exiled to the region of Wegera, a remote mountainous area in northern Ethiopia, where he remained imprisoned for over a decade.

Estifanos was initially held in the fortress-prison of Amba Sel, a site frequently used for state prisoners and religious dissidents during the reign of Zara Yaqob. However, as his teachings continued to circulate—especially among rural populations, disenchanted clergy, and even former court scribes—imperial officials viewed his influence as a lingering subversive threat. He was eventually transferred under heavy guard to increasingly isolated and barren locations, deprived of adequate provisions, companionship, and liturgical materials.

During this period, Estifanos was deprived of his sacred books, including his copy of the Psalms and the Gospels, which he had previously used for daily prayer and meditation. In one episode, his jailers confiscated his Bible and Psalter, forcing him to rely on memory for prayer and meditation. Despite his circumstances, Estifanos reportedly continued composing theological reflections and sending exhortations to his disciples through clandestine messengers.

Despite his imprisonment, Estifanos maintained correspondence and spiritual influence through secret messengers and followers who braved imperial threats. The Geʽez Acts depict him continuing to teach, compose hymns, and receive visions during this period.

In his final years, Estifanos endured increasing physical deterioration. The Geʽez Acts offer poignant descriptions of how he was routinely mocked by guards, deprived of food, and forced to sleep without clothing or shelter. One passage states that he was “naked and tied with ropes, wounded from the cold, with nothing to eat but grass”. His physical suffering became central to the spiritual identity of his followers, who came to view him as a “suffering prophet,” undergoing redemptive martyrdom.

Estifanos is believed to have died in exile around 1458, still held under imperial detention. According to the tradition preserved in the Acts, his body was not given a Christian burial but may have been left exposed or discarded without rites—a final attempt to strip him of honor and erase his spiritual legacy.

Despite the imperial effort to erase his legacy, the Stephanites commemorated his death as a “triumph in chains”—the martyrdom of a man who remained faithful to his convictions even when stripped of dignity, possessions, and freedom. Within decades, underground Stephanite communities preserved his memory as that of a saint who remained steadfast “unto death,” and whose message, though his body was bound and humiliated, remained free and enduring.

One of the final lines attributed to the Stephanite community in the Acts reads:

“He died in chains, but the Word which he bore cannot be chained.”
— *Geʽez Acts of Abba Estifanos*, trans. Getatchew Haile, 2006, p. 115

This statement encapsulated Estifanos’ enduring reputation among his followers: a martyr of conscience, whose steadfast refusal to bow—either to the cross of imperial idolatry or to the throne—redefined the boundaries of spiritual authority in fifteenth-century Ethiopia.

== Legacy ==
Although condemned as a heretic during his lifetime and relentlessly persecuted by both the imperial state and the Ethiopian Orthodox Tewahedo Church, Abba Estifanos’ legacy endured through his disciples, his writings, and the enduring influence of the Stephanite movement. Far from extinguishing his ideas, the brutal repression he faced only deepened his followers’ reverence and inspired a long tradition of underground resistance.

His followers—among them Gabra Masih, Ezra of Shire, and Benyam—preserved and circulated his teachings after his death. They compiled oral testimonies and liturgical fragments into what later became the Geʽez Acts of Abba Estifanos, a powerful theological and hagiographical text that articulated both his doctrinal vision and his suffering under persecution. This work, copied clandestinely for generations, became central to the identity and survival of the Stephanites, who maintained a strict adherence to his original teachings.

Although his memory remains contested within official ecclesiastical structures, Abba Estifanos has emerged in recent scholarship as a symbol of ethical resistance, theological independence, and radical integrity. The continued circulation of his Acts and the interest in his life among Ethiopian historians, philologists, and believers today testify to the enduring relevance of his vision—one rooted in Scripture, forged through suffering, and animated by a profound desire for spiritual truth. Modern scholars and some communities in the Tigray Region view his persecution as one of the most significant episodes of religious martyrdom in Ethiopian history, and the Dekike Estifanos are often remembered as early champions of conscience, reform, and spiritual integrity in the face of totalitarian rule.

=== Persecution of the Stephanites ===
After Estifanos’ death, the Stephanite movement did not disappear. It persisted for several decades in remote areas of northern Ethiopia, particularly in Wag, Semien, and Tigray, where small communities of monks and lay followers continued to practice his ascetic discipline, reject the veneration of the cross and icons, and prioritize biblical obedience over ecclesiastical tradition.

However, the Stephanites faced one of the most brutal religious persecutions in medieval Ethiopia's history. Under the reign of Emperor Zara Yaqob (r. 1434–1468), the movement was systematically dismantled through a coordinated campaign of massacres, monastic destruction, and doctrinal suppression.

According to The Acts of Abba Estifanos and the Chronicle of Zara Yaqob, thousands of Stephanite monks, nuns, and lay followers were either executed or tortured to death for refusing to recant their faith. The emperor issued edicts mandating that all subjects bow before the Cross of Jesus and icons of the Virgin Mary—a gesture the Stephanites viewed as idolatrous. Those who resisted were mutilated, often by having their noses and ears cut off, and then publicly stoned. On the 10th of Magabit, thirty-eight days after a mass execution of Stephanite followers, a great light appeared in the sky, visible throughout the land. The emperor interpreted the event as a divine sign and ordered the founding of the town of Dabra Berhan, which means “Mount of Light”. Though this tradition is not part of the formal Synaxarium, it remains central in Tigrayan popular memory.

Contemporary estimates and later hagiographic accounts indicate that over 4,000 members of the movement were killed during this period, including nearly 500 monks and clergy associated with Stephanite monastic centers such as Qoyetsa, Gunda Gunde, and other sites across Enderta, Agame, and southern Tigray. In parallel, Zara Yaqob is said to have ordered the destruction of over 200 monasteries suspected of harboring Stephanite sympathies or texts. This campaign not only targeted individuals but sought to obliterate the very institutional memory of the movement by burning scriptures, dismantling cells, and razing liturgical schools linked to the sect.

In the wake of this persecution, surviving followers of Abba Estifanos were forced underground. Some fled to remote regions such as the Semien, Wag, and the Eritrean highlands. Others reportedly assimilated into more conventional branches of the Ethiopian Orthodox Tewahedo Church under duress. Within a generation, the movement had lost its organizational core and public visibility.

The theological positions of the Dekike Estifanos were officially condemned as heresy by imperial and church councils, and their memory was suppressed in both ecclesiastical literature and state chronicles for centuries. Later oral traditions and regional folklore claim that the Ethiopian Orthodox Church institutionalized the sign of the cross when passing a church as a way to detect Stephanites, who refused such gestures. While their teachings continued to circulate in oral traditions, the Stephanite movement effectively ceased to exist as an organized body by the late 15th century. Its remnants—monastic ruins, underground manuscripts, and fragmented oral histories—remained largely hidden until the rediscovery of the Acts in the 20th century.

=== A proto-protestant? Academic assessment ===
Modern scholars have increasingly recognized Abba Estifanos of Gwendagwende as one of the earliest documented figures of Christian reform on the African continent. Though excommunicated as a heresiarch by 15th-century Ethiopian ecclesiastical authorities, Estifanos’ emphasis on scriptural primacy, personal piety, and rejection of what he perceived as idolatrous religious practices has led many academics to reevaluate his movement as an indigenous expression of proto-Reformation theology.

Several scholars—particularly within Ethiopian studies and intellectual circles—have drawn comparisons between Estifanos and European religious reformers such as John Wycliffe, Jan Hus, Martin Luther, and John Calvin. Like these later figures, Estifanos advocated a return to the authority of Scripture alone, challenged the use of icons and material symbols in worship, denounced the veneration of Saints, the Cross, and the Virgin Mary, and protested the entanglement of religious institutions with imperial power.

His followers, the Stephanites, adopted an egalitarian and ascetic lifestyle, emphasized direct engagement with the Holy Scriptures, and promoted a vision of moral accountability that defied both the clergy's authority and imperial decree. Scholar Steven Kaplan characterizes Estifanos as a “radical iconoclast” whose spiritual ideals stood in stark contrast to the ritual and political orthodoxy of his day, placing him in alignment—both structurally and ethically—with the major figures of the Protestant Reformation.

Ethiopian philosopher Maimire Mennasemay offers a particularly robust reassessment of Estifanos, arguing that the Stephanite movement represented a distinctly Ethiopian form of “emancipatory critique.” For him, Estifanos was not simply a religious dissenter, but a visionary who challenged both theological absolutism and state coercion. His insistence on spiritual autonomy, personal conscience, and ethical truth over hierarchical authority anticipates many of the ideals of Enlightenment thought—making him, in Mennasemay's words, “a radical conscience of his time.”

Although Estifanos’ theology lacks certain distinct Protestant formulations—such as the doctrine of Sola fide (justification by faith alone)—his movement's structural critique of ecclesiastical corruption, emphasis on Scripture, and rejection of clerical mediation have led some to label him an “African precursor to the Reformation.” While others urge caution against mapping Eurocentric categories onto a 15th-century Ethiopian context, there is increasing consensus that Abba Estifanos’ reformist vision was an internally rooted response to the political-theological challenges of his time. The Dekike Estifanos thus stand as one of the most significant indigenous Christian reform movements in African religious history.

=== Local veneration ===
Though not officially canonized, Abba Estifanos is widely venerated in the Tigray Region of northern Ethiopia, especially among local communities who consider him a saint, martyr, and visionary reformer. His memory is most prominent in the area of Gunda Gunde, his birthplace in the historical province of Agame, where oral traditions, local poetry, and folk religious practices continue to celebrate his faithfulness, moral purity and refusal to bow to state-imposed religious customs.

A significant day of commemoration is Yekatit 30 (March 9, Gregorian), known in certain Tigrayan communities as “Abba Estifanos Day,” marked by liturgical prayer, oral storytelling, poetic recitations, and commemorative gatherings. Though these observances are unofficial and not part of the standardized Synaxarium of the Church, they reflect the enduring popular esteem held for Estifanos and his disciples, the Stephanites, by celebrating steadfastness in the face of religious persecution.

In recent years, particularly during and after the Tigray War, Estifanos and the Stephanites have been increasingly invoked by local activists, writers, and community leaders as symbols of spiritual resistance, truth-telling, and nonviolent conscience. Diaspora communities, including those in North America and Europe, have begun to include commemorations of Abba Estifanos in their cultural and religious calendars.

Although his name remains absent from formal liturgical calendars, many within the Tigrayan Orthodox Tewahedo Church regard him as a righteous martyr, and some local churches and communities treat his example as an integral part of their spiritual heritage. In this way, his memory endures not only as a theological figure, but as a cultural icon of Tigrayan moral dissent and fidelity to conscience.

== Further readings ==
- Mesfin Shuge, "Biography of 'Hadege Anbesa' (Abba Stephanos) of the Orthodox Church," term paper, Ethiopian Graduate School of Theology (EGST), Addis Ababa (May 2001).
- Steven Kaplan, Monastic Holy Man and the Christianization of Early Solomonic Ethiopia (Wiesbaden: Franz Steiner, 1984), pp. 41–44.
- Dr. Dirshaye Menberu, "Abba Estifanos (Hadege Anbesa)" Dictionary of African Christian Biography, http://www.dacb.org/stories/ethiopia/estifanos_.html (2005)
- Dr. Getatchew Haile (translator), The Ge'ez Acts of Abba Estifanos of Gwendagwende (2006)
- https://www.youtube.com/watch?v=EdGwhsh9pTg
