= Abune Mathias–Abune Sawiros schism =

2023 religious tension in Ethiopia

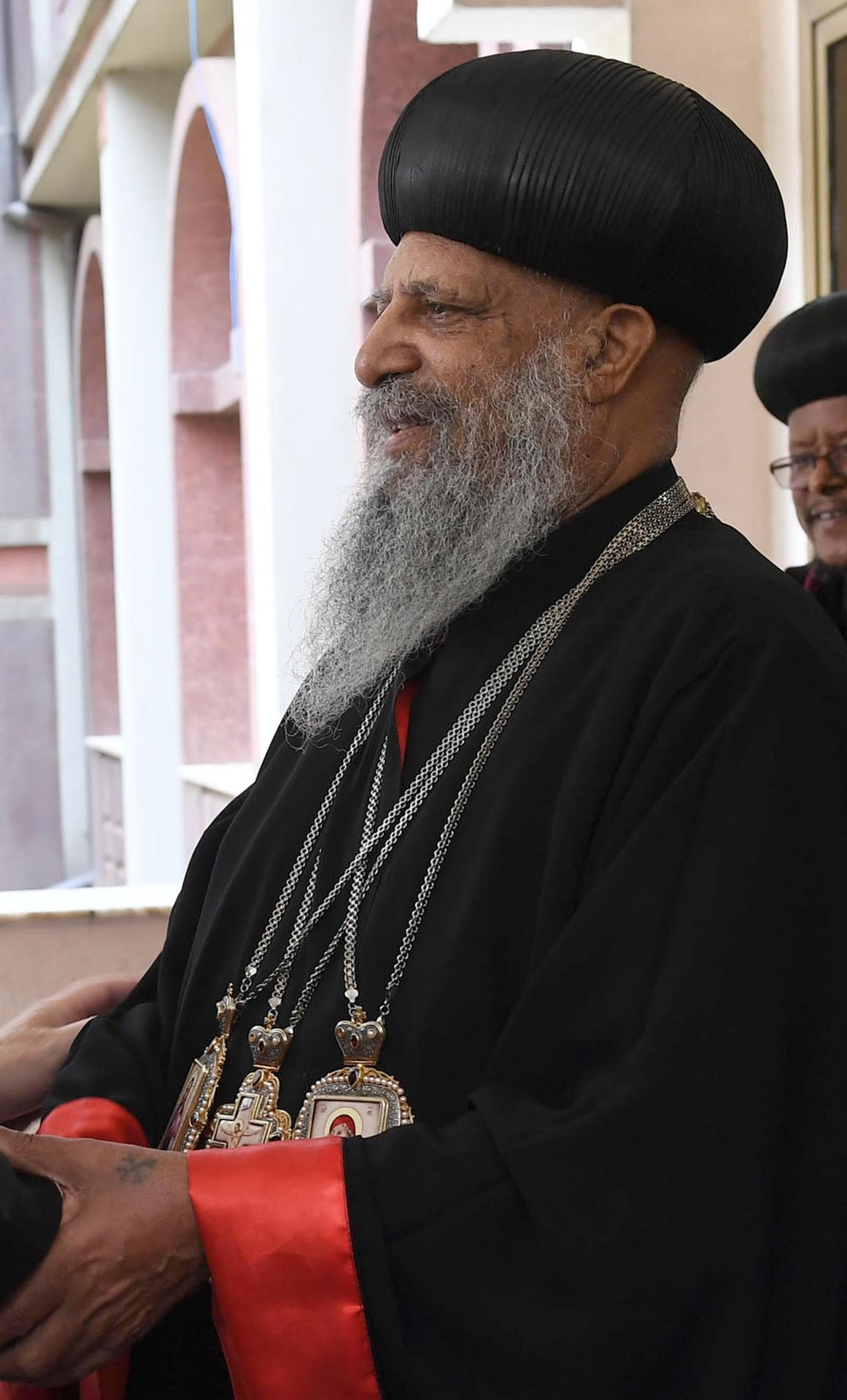
- The Ethiopian Orthodox Patriarch Abune Mathias in 2018
- Date: 22 January 2023
- Location: Oromia Region, Addis Ababa, Ethiopia
- Cause: Accustions of the illegally ordinated synod of ethnic discrimination by the Ethiopian Orthodox Church
- Target: Overthrowing the Holy Synod of the Ethiopian Orthodox Church and the Patriarch Abune Mathias to form Oromia Region Synod
- Perpetrator: Abune Sawiros
- Deaths: 30 as of February 10

On 22 January 2023, three bishops led by Abune Sawiros formed 25-episcopate in Oromia and Southern Nations, Nationalities, and Peoples' Region that is condemned by the Holy Synod of the Ethiopian Orthodox Church, led by Patriarch Abune Mathias. The group accused the Holy Synod of discriminating ethnic groups. On 26 January, the Holy Synod excommunicated them, while one archbishop of the group demanded apology to the Ethiopian Orthodox Church officials.

The Ethiopian Orthodox Church accused Prime Minister Abiy Ahmed for meddling the church affairs. Violence were erupted in the southern region which killed at least 30 people. On 4 February, a clash occurred in Shashamane that killed three Orthodox youths. The Ethiopian government blocked access of social media sites such as Facebook, Messenger, Telegram, YouTube and TikTok for five months from 9 February until 17 July. The schism was resolved on February 16th.

== Incident ==
On 22 January 2023, three bishops in Oromia Region diocese led by Abune Sawiros illegally formed 25-episcopate named “Holy Synod of Oromia Nations and Nationalities.” Three days later, the Holy Synod of the Ethiopian Orthodox Church excommunicated the group, accusing the Abiy Ahmed government for meddling to the church's affair. Holiness Patriarch Abune Mathias said that "the government should not meddle in the ecclesiastical and canonical matters of the church." The newly appointed archbishops accused the Church for discriminating ethnic groups, aiming to form multilingual and multiethnic synod loyal to Oromia region diocese. Sawiros claimed that "EOTC’s tendency to “appoint spiritual fathers from one area [Amhara]…caused the followers of the church to leave.”

On 26 January the Holy Synod officially excommunicated the group, three archbishops were accused of illegal ordination while one of those repented to the Holy Synod for breaching the Fetha Negest dogma.

== Aftermath ==
It was reported that the government, together with the Oromia Special Force supported the illegal synod to take over churches in the Southern Nations and Oromia Region. On 4 February, three Orthodox Christians killed in Shashamane during the violence. According to Tewhedo Media Center (TMC), Abune Henok, the head of Addis Ababa diocese described the event "shameful and heart-wrenching". The Holy Synod urged its clergies and followers to wear black suit and called for demonstrations at home and churches as well as abroad on 12 February. According to the Ethiopian Human Rights Commission, "eight people died in attacks on a church in southern Ethiopia. Security forces and their (civilian) collaborators used disproportionate force leaving at least eight dead by either gunshot wounds or beatings.”

The government responded to the incident by blocking some social media platforms such as Facebook, YouTube, Telegram, Messenger, and TikTok on 9 February, with VPN service only available to access these sites. According to UK-based VPN organization TOP10VPN, Ethiopia's usage to VPN servicing reached to 1,430% as of 10 February. The block was then lifted after five months on 17 July.

== Response ==
Some Ethiopian opposition groups condemned the alleged government action for meddling the church. The Ethiopian Citizens For Social Justice Party (EZEMA) concerned about the government decision by citing Article 11 of the FDRE Constitution, which stipulates the separation of church and state. The party worried that "We advise that interference in religious affairs by any entity could have multiple consequences and relevant stakeholders should make ultimate caution."

== See Also ==
- Kesis Belay Meokonin
