= Christianity in the 17th century =

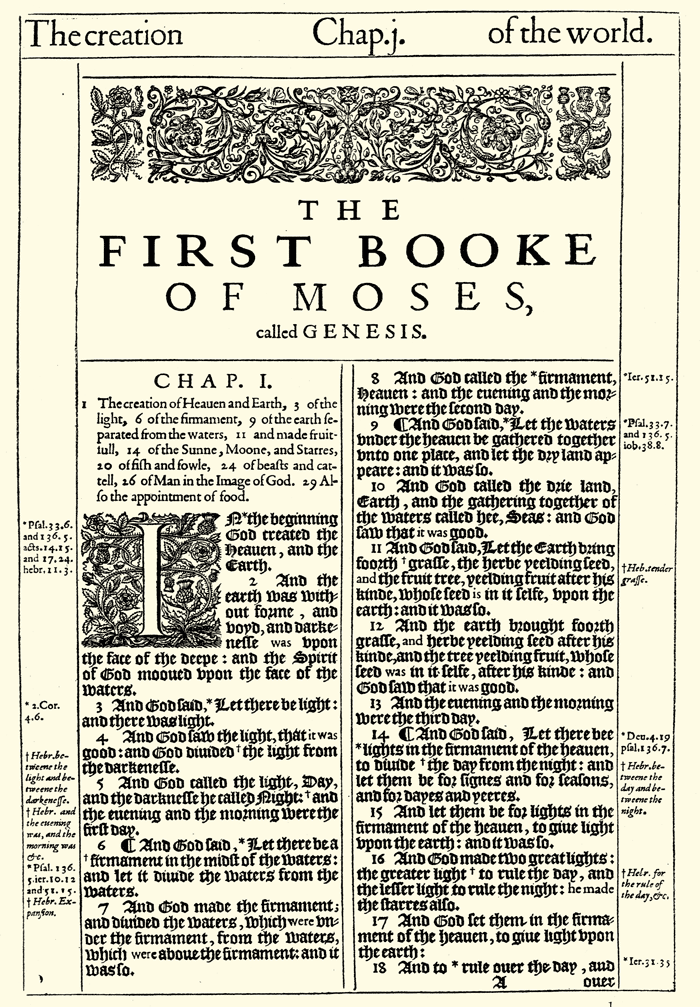
The first page of Genesis from the 1611 first edition of the Authorized King James Version. The KJV is an Early Modern English translation of the Bible by certain members of the Church of England that was begun in 1604 and completed in 1611.

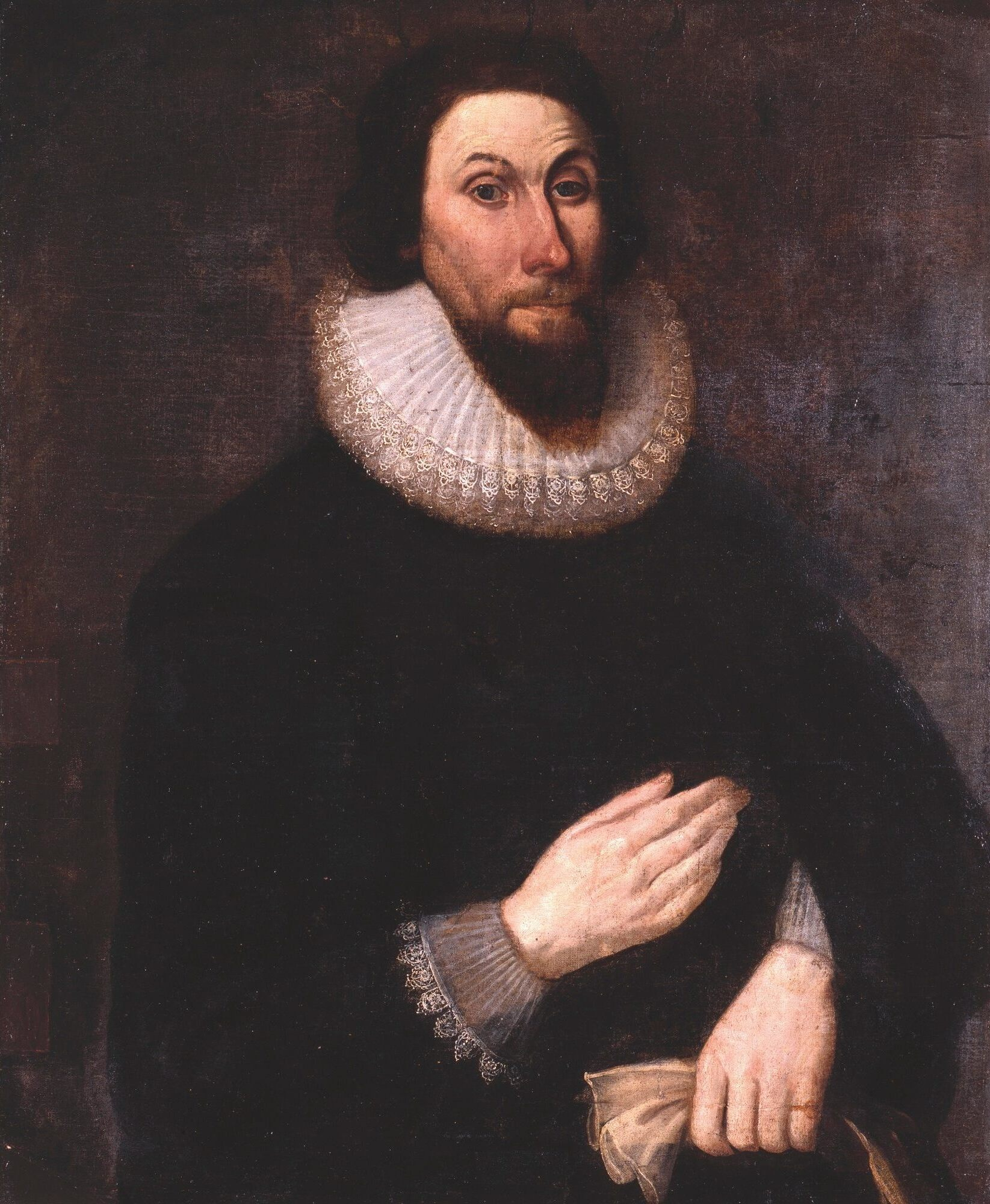
John Winthrop (1587/8-1649), Governor of the Massachusetts Bay Colony, who led the Puritans in the Great Migration, beginning in 1630.

17th-century missionary activity in Asia and the Americas grew strongly, put down roots, and developed its institutions, though it met with strong resistance in Japan in particular. At the same time Christian colonization of some areas outside Europe succeeded, driven by economic as well as religious reasons. Christian traders were heavily involved in the Atlantic slave trade, which transported Africans into Christian communities. A land war between Christianity and Islam continued, in the form of the campaigns of the Habsburg Empire and Ottoman Empire in the Balkans, a turning point coming at Vienna in 1683. The Tsardom of Russia, where Orthodox Christianity was the established religion, expanded eastwards into Siberia and Central Asia, regions of Islamic and shamanistic beliefs, and also southwest into Ukraine, where the Uniate Eastern Catholic Churches arose.

There was a very large volume of Christian literature published, particularly controversial and millennial but also historical and scholarly. Hagiography became more critical with the Bollandists, and ecclesiastical history became thoroughly developed and debated, with Catholic scholars such as Baronius and Jean Mabillon, and Protestants such as David Blondel laying down the lines of scholarship. Christian art of the Baroque and music derived from church forms was striking and influential on lay artists using secular expression and themes. Poetry and drama often treated Biblical and religious matter, for example John Milton's Paradise Lost.

== Changing attitudes, Protestant and Catholic ==
At the beginning of the century James I of England opposed the papal deposing power in a series of controversial works, and the assassination of Henry IV of France caused an intense focus on the theological doctrines concerned with tyrannicide. Both Henry and James, in different ways, pursued a peaceful policy of religious conciliation, aimed at eventually healing the breach caused by the Protestant Reformation. While progress along these lines seemed more possible during the Twelve Years' Truce, conflicts after 1620 changed the picture; and the situation of Western and Central Europe after the Peace of Westphalia left a more stable but entrenched polarisation of Protestant and Catholic territorial states, with religious minorities.

The religious conflicts in Catholic France over Jansenism and Port-Royal produced the controversial work Lettres Provinciales by Blaise Pascal. In it he took aim at the prevailing climate of moral theology, a speciality of the Jesuit order and the attitude of the Collège de Sorbonne. Pascal argued against the casuistry at that time deployed in "cases of conscience", particularly doctrines associated with probabilism.

By the end of the 17th century, the Dictionnaire Historique et Critique by Pierre Bayle represented the current debates in the Republic of Letters, a largely secular network of scholars and savants who commented in detail on religious matters as well as those of science. Proponents of wider religious toleration—and a sceptical line on many traditional beliefs—argued with increasing success for changes of attitude in many areas (including discrediting the False Decretals and the legend of Pope Joan, magic and witchcraft, millennialism and extremes of anti-Catholic propaganda, and toleration of Jews in society).

=== Polemicism and Irenicism ===
Contention between Catholic and Protestant matters gave rise to a substantial polemical literature, written both in Latin to appeal to international opinion among the educated, and in vernacular languages. In a climate where opinion was thought open to argument, the production of polemical literature was part of the role of prelates and other prominent churchmen, academics (in universities) and seminarians (in religious colleges); institutions such as Chelsea College in London and Arras College in Paris were set up expressly to favor such writing.

The major debates between Protestants and Catholics proving inconclusive, and theological issues within Protestantism being divisive, there was also a return to the Irenicism: the search for religious peace. David Pareus was a leading Reformed theologian who favored an approach based on reconciliation of views. Other leading figures such as Marco Antonio de Dominis, Hugo Grotius and John Dury worked in this direction.

=== Heresy and demonology ===
The last person to be executed by fire for heresy in England was Edward Wightman in 1612. The legislation relating to this penalty was in fact only changed in 1677, after which those convicted on a heresy charge would suffer at most excommunication. Accusations of heresy, whether the revival of Late Antique debates such as those over Pelagianism and Arianism or more recent views such as Socinianism in theology and Copernicanism in natural philosophy, continued to play an important part in intellectual life.

At the same time as the judicial pursuit of heresy became less severe, interest in demonology was intense in many European countries. The sceptical arguments against the existence of witchcraft and demonic possession were still contested into the 1680s by theologians. The Gangraena by Thomas Edwards used a framework equating heresy and possession to draw attention to the variety of radical Protestant views current in the 1640s.

=== Trial of Galileo ===
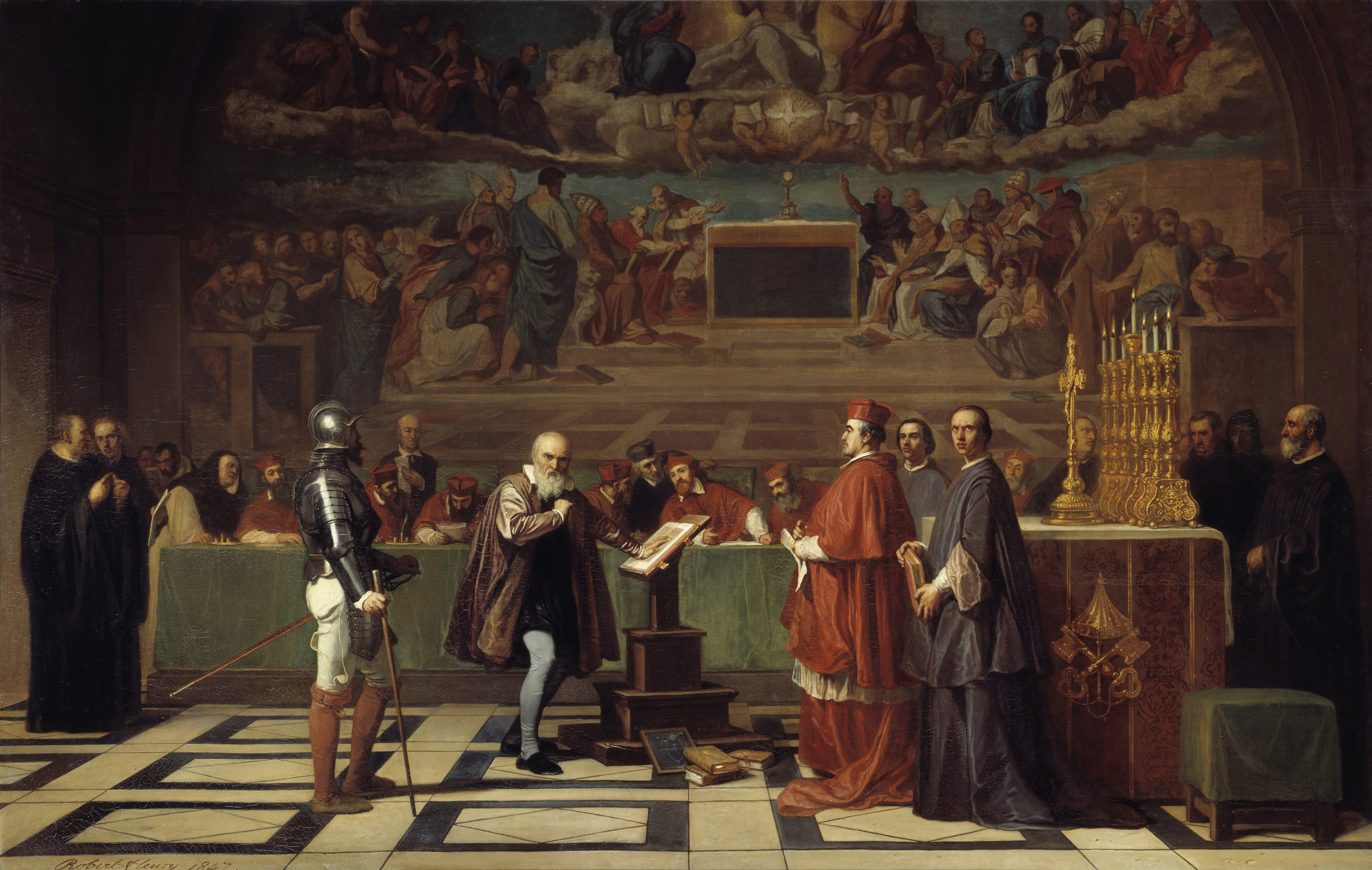
Galileo before the Holy Office, a 19th-century painting by Joseph-Nicolas Robert-Fleury.

In 1610, Galileo Galilei published his Sidereus Nuncius, describing observations that he had made with the new telescope. These and other discoveries exposed difficulties with the understanding of the heavens current since antiquity and raised interest in teachings such as the heliocentric theory of Copernicus.

In reaction, scholars such as Cosimo Boscaglia maintained that the motion of the Earth and immobility of the Sun were heretical, as they contradicted some accounts given in the Bible as understood at that time. Galileo's part in the controversies over theology, astronomy and philosophy culminated in his trial and sentencing in 1633, on a suspicion of heresy.

The Galileo affair—the process by which Galileo came into conflict with the Roman Catholic Church over his support of Copernican astronomy—has often been considered a defining moment in the history of the relationship between religion and science.

== Protestantism ==
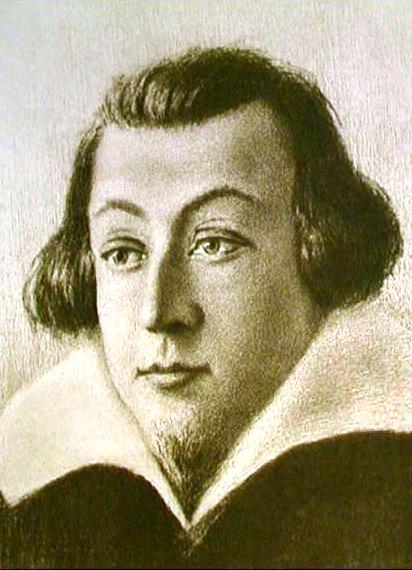
Jiří Třanovský (1592–1637)- the "Luther of the Slavs" who was active in Bohemia, Moravia, Poland and Slovakia.

The Protestant lands at the beginning of the 17th century were concentrated in Northern Europe, with territories in Germany, Scandinavia, England, Scotland, and areas of France, the Low Countries, Switzerland, Kingdom of Hungary and Poland. Heavy fighting, in some cases a continuation of the religious conflicts of the previous centuries, was seen, particularly in the Low Countries and the Electorate of the Palatinate (which saw the outbreak of the Thirty Years' War). In Ireland there was a concerted attempt to create "plantations" of Protestant settlers in what was a predominantly Catholic country, and fighting with a religious dimension was serious in the 1640s and 1680s. In France the settlement proposed by the Edict of Nantes was whittled away, to the disadvantage of the Huguenot population, and the edict was revoked in 1685.

Protestant Europe was largely divided into Lutheran and Reformed (Calvinist) areas, with the Church of England maintaining a separate position. Efforts to unify Lutherans and Calvinists had little success; and the ecumenical ambition to overcome the schism of the Protestant Reformation remained almost entirely theoretical. The Church of England under William Laud made serious approaches to figures in the Orthodox Church, looking for common ground.

Within Calvinism an important split occurred with the rise of Arminianism; the Synod of Dort of 1618–19 was a national gathering but with international repercussions, as the teaching of Arminius was firmly rejected at a meeting to which Protestant theologians from outside the Netherlands were invited. The Westminster Assembly of the 1640s was another major council dealing with Reformed theology, and some of its works continue to be important to Protestant denominations.

=== Puritan movement and English Civil War ===
In the 1640s England, Scotland, Wales and Ireland underwent religious strife comparable to that which its neighbors had suffered some generations before. The rancor associated with these wars is partly attributed to the nature of the Puritan movement, a description of which is found to be unsatisfactory by many historians. In its early stages the Puritan movement (late 16th–17th centuries) stood for reform in the Church of England, within the Calvinist tradition, aiming to make the Church of England resemble more closely the Protestant churches of Europe, especially Geneva. The Puritans refused to endorse completely all of the ritual directions and formulas of the Book of Common Prayer; the imposition of its liturgical order by legal force and inspection sharpened Puritanism into a definite opposition movement.

The English Civil War was a series of armed conflicts and political machinations between Parliamentarians and Royalists. The first (1642–46) and second (1648–49) civil wars pitted the supporters of King Charles I against the supporters of the Long Parliament, while the third war (1649–51) saw fighting between supporters of King Charles II and supporters of the Rump Parliament. The wars ended with the Parliamentary victory at the Battle of Worcester on 3 September 1651.

The war led to the trial and execution of Charles I, the exile of his son, Charles II, and replacement of English monarchy with first, the Commonwealth of England (1649–53), and then with a Protectorate (1653–59) under Oliver Cromwell's personal rule. In Ireland military victory for the Parliamentarian forces established the Protestant Ascendancy.

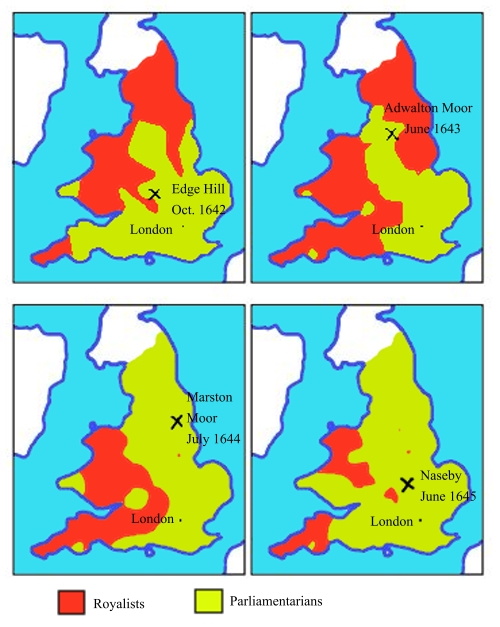
Maps of territory held by Royalists (red) and Parliamentarians (green), 1642 — 1645

After coming to political power as a result of the First English Civil War, the Puritan clergy had an opportunity to set up a national church along Presbyterian lines; for reasons that were also largely political, they failed to do so effectively. After the English Restoration of 1660 the Church of England was purged within a few years of its Puritan elements. The successors of the Puritans, in terms of their beliefs, are referred to as Dissenters and Nonconformists, and included those who formed various Reformed denominations.

=== Puritan emigration ===
Emigration to North America of Protestants, in what became New England, was led by a group of Puritan separatists based in the Netherlands ("the pilgrims"). Establishing a colony at Plymouth in 1620, they received a charter from the King of England. This successful, though initially quite difficult, colony marked the beginning of the Protestant presence in America (the earlier French, Spanish and Portuguese settlements were Catholic). Unlike the Spanish or French, the English colonists made little initial effort to evangelise the native peoples.

== Roman Catholicism ==
=== Devotions to Mary ===
Pope Paul V and Gregory XV ruled in 1617 and 1622 that it was invalid to say that Mary was conceived non-immaculate. Alexander VII declared in 1661 that the soul of Mary was free from original sin. Popular Marian piety was even more colourful and varied than ever before, and included numerous Marian pilgrimages, Marian Salve devotions, new Marian litanies, Marian theatre plays, Marian hymns, Marian processions. Marian fraternities, today mostly defunct, had millions of members.

=== Pope Innocent XI ===
Toward the latter part of the 17th century, Pope Innocent XI viewed the increasing Turkish attacks against Europe, which were supported by France, as the major threat for the Church. He built a Polish-Austrian coalition for the Turkish defeat at Vienna in 1683. Scholars have called him a saintly pope because he reformed abuses by the Church, including simony, nepotism and the lavish papal expenditures that had caused him to inherit a papal debt of 50,000,000 scudi. By eliminating certain honorary posts and introducing new fiscal policies, Innocent XI was able to regain control of the Church's finances.

=== France and Gallicanism ===
In 1685, gallicanist King Louis XIV of France issued the Revocation of the Edict of Nantes, ending a century of religious toleration. France forced Catholic theologians to support conciliarism and deny Papal infallibility. The king threatened Pope Innocent XI with a Catholic Ecumenical Council and a military take-over of the Papal state. The absolute French state used gallicanism to gain control of virtually all major Church appointments as well as many of the Church's properties.

== Spread of Christianity ==
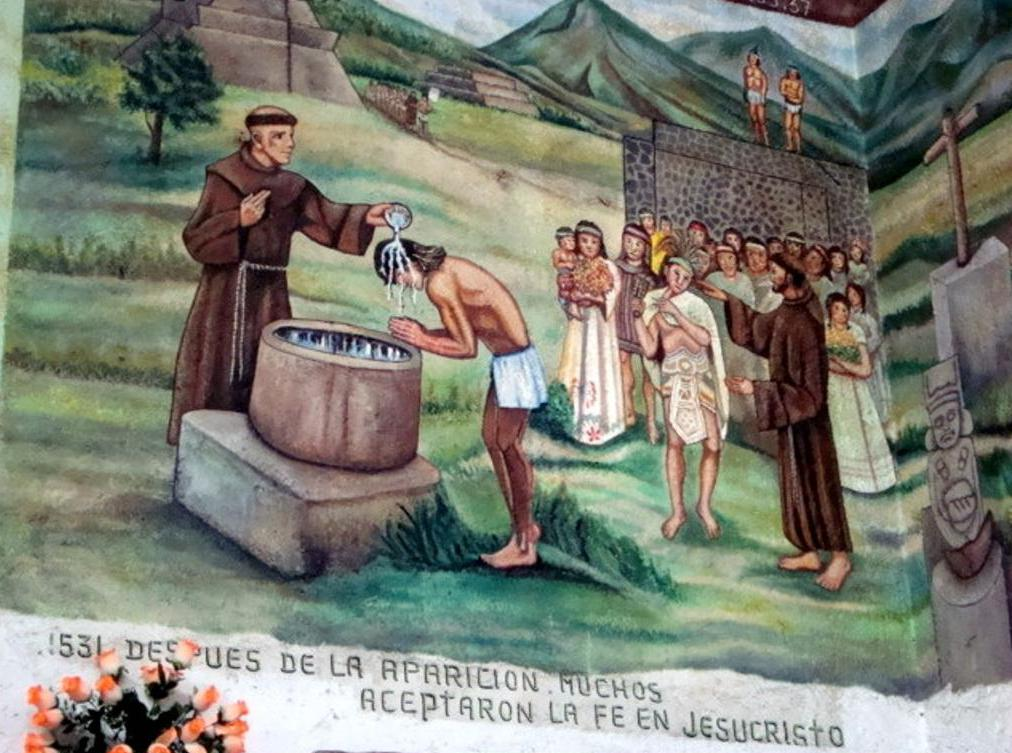
Evangelization of Mexico

The expansion of the Catholic Portuguese Empire and Spanish Empire, with a significant role played by the Roman Catholic Church, led to a Christianization of the indigenous peoples of the Americas such as the Aztecs and Incas. Later waves of colonial expansion such as the struggle for India, by the Dutch, England, France, Germany, Russia and Spanish led to Christianization beyond Asia, such as Philippines.

=== Roman Catholic missions ===
During the Age of Discovery, the Roman Catholic Church established a number of Missions in the Americas and other colonies in order to spread Christianity in the New World and to convert the indigenous peoples. The Portuguese sent missions into Africa. At the same time, missionaries such as Francis Xavier as well as other Jesuits, Augustinians, Franciscans and Dominicans were moving into Asia and the Far East. These orders often served additionally to their spiritual role as diplomatic intermediaries between local rulers and European countries such as in Persia, where, though they were limited in their success, helped to establish meaningful relations between the Safavid Iran and European powers.

The most significant failure of Roman Catholic missionary work was in Ethiopia. Although its ruler, Emperor Susenyos, had publicly declared his conversion to Catholicism in 1622, the declaration of Roman Catholicism as the official religion in 1626 led to increasing civil war. Following Susenyos' abdication, his son and successor Fasilides expelled archbishop Afonso Mendes and his Jesuit brethren in 1633, then in 1665 ordered the remaining religious writings of the Catholics burnt. On the other hand, other missions (notably Matteo Ricci's Jesuit mission to China) were relatively peaceful and focused on integration rather than cultural imperialism.

The first Catholic mission in Sichuan was carried out by Lodovico Buglio in 1640. The first Catholic church was built in Beijing in 1650. The emperor granted freedom of religion to Catholics. Ricci had modified the Catholic faith to Chinese thinking, permitting among other things the veneration of the dead. The Vatican disagreed and forbade any adaptation in the so-called Chinese Rites controversy in 1692 and 1742.

== Eastern Orthodoxy ==
=== Dispute between Constantinople and Alexandria ===
In a dispute with Patriarch Nicephorus of Alexandria, Ecumenical Patriarch Parthenius I of Constantinople sided with the hierarchs of the Church of Sinai by granting them permission to perform religious services in Cairo when Nicephorus was visiting Moldovlachia. After Nicephorus was back in Alexandria, his protests made Parthenius revoke his permission. Still, the tensions over this issue continued between the two Churches.

=== Synod of Jassy ===
In 1641, Parthenius summoned a synod at Constantinople, at which eight prelates and four dignitaries of the church were present. In this synod the term Transubstantiation is said to have been authorised. In the next year Parthenius organized the more important Synod of Iași. The purpose of this assembly was to counter certain Catholic and Protestant doctrinal errors which had infiltrated Orthodox theology and to offer a comprehensive Orthodox statement on the truth of faith. Including representatives of the Greek and Slavic Churches, it condemned the Calvinist teachings ascribed to Cyril Lucaris and ratified (a somewhat amended text of) Peter Mogila's Expositio fidei (Statement of Faith, also known as the Orthodox Confession), a description of Christian orthodoxy in a question and answer format. The Statement of Faith became fundamental for establishing the Orthodox world's attitude toward Reformation thought. The major contribution of the synod was the reinforced sense of unity in the Eastern Orthodox Church through the promulgation of an authoritative statement agreed upon by all the major sees.

=== Synod of Jerusalem ===
In 1672, Patriarch Dositheos II of Jerusalem convened the Synod of Jerusalem that rejected all the Calvinist doctrines and reformulated Orthodox teachings in a manner that distinguished them from Roman Catholicism as well as Protestantism.

The Synod was attended by most of the prominent representatives of the Eastern Orthodox Church, including six Metropolitans besides Dositheus and his retired predecessor, and its decrees received universal acceptance as an expression of the faith of the Eastern Orthodox Church.

Against both the Roman Catholic Church and most Protestants, the Synod affirmed that the Holy Spirit proceeds from God the Father alone and not from both Father and Son.

In the Synod's decrees, called the Confession of Dositheus, it reaffirmed existing Orthodox beliefs incompatible with Calvinist doctrines, restating that apostolic succession of bishops is necessary, that good works done with faith are required for salvation, that there are seven sacraments, that the Eucharist is both sacrament and sacrifice, offered for the dead as well as for the living.

=== Russian Orthodox Church ===
The fall of Constantinople in the East, 1453, led to a significant shift of gravity to the rising state of Russia, the "Third Rome". The Renaissance also stimulated a program of reforms by patriarchs of prayer books. A movement called the "Old believers" consequently resulted and influenced Russian Orthodox theology in the direction of conservatism and Erastianism.

== Timeline ==
17th century Timeline
- 1601 – Matteo Ricci goes to China; First ordination of Japanese priests
- 1602 – Chinese scientist and translator Xu Guangqi is baptized; Simon Morales establishes a Augustinian mission in the Safavid capital of Isfahan
- 1603 – The Jesuit Mission Press in Japan commences publication of a Japanese-Portuguese dictionary, the Nippo Jisho
- 1604 – Fausto Paolo Sozzini Socinianism
- 1604 – Jesuit missionary Abbè Jessè Flèchè arrives at Port Royal, Nova Scotia
- 1605 – Roberto de Nobili goes to India
- 1606 – Japanese shōgun Tokugawa Ieyasu bans Christianity
- 1606 Carlo Maderno redesigns St Peter's Basilica into a Latin cross
- 1607 – Missionary Juan Fonte establishes the first Jesuit mission among the Tarahumara in the Sierra Madre Mountains of Northwest Mexico
- 1607 Jamestown, Virginia founded
- 1608 – A missionary expedition into the Ceará area of Brazil fails when the Tacariju kill the Jesuit leader
- 1608 Quebec City founded by Samuel de Champlain
- 1609 – Missionary Nicolas Trigault goes to China
- 1609 Baptist Church founded by John Smyth, due to objections to infant baptism and demands for church-state separation
- 1609–1610 Douay-Rheims Bible, 1st Catholic English translation, OT published in two volumes, based on an unofficial Louvain text corrected by the Sistine Vulgate, NT is Rheims text of 1582
- 1610 – Chinese mathematician and astronomer Li Zhizao is baptized
- 1611 – Two Jesuits begin work among Mi'kmaq Indians of Nova Scotia
- 1611–1800 King James Version (Authorised Version) is released, based primarily on Wycliffe's work & Bishop's Bible of 1572, translators are accused of being "damnable corrupters of God's word", original included Apocrypha
- 1612 – Jesuits found a mission for the Abenakis in Maine
- 1613 – Missionary Alvarus de Semedo goes to China
- 1614 – Anti-Christian edicts issued in Japan] with over 40,000 Christians being massacred
- 1614 Fama Fraternitatis, the first Rosicrucian manifesto (may have been in circulation ca. 1610) presenting the "Fraternity of the Rose Cross"
- 1615 – French missionaries in Canada open schools in Trois-Rivières and Tadoussac to teach First Nations children with the hopes of converting them
- 1615 Confessio Fraternitatis, the second Rosicrucian manifesto describing the "Most Honorable Order" as Christian
- 1616 – Nanjing Missionary Case in which the clash between Chinese practice of ancestor worship and Catholic doctrine ends in the deportation of foreign missionaries. Missionary Johann Adam Schall von Bell arrives in China
- 1616 Chemical Wedding of Christian Rosenkreutz, the third Rosicrucian manifesto (an hermetic allegory presenting alchemical and Christian elements)
- 1617 – Portuguese missionary Francisco de Pina arrives in Vietnam
- 1618 – Portuguese Carmelites go from Persia to Pakistan to establish a church in Thatta (near Karachi)
- 1618–1648 Thirty Years' War
- 1619 – Dominican missionaries found the University of St. Tomas in the Philippine islands
- 1620 – Carmelites enter Goa
- 1620 Plymouth Colony founded
- 1621 – The Augustinians establish themselves in Chittagong
- 1621 Robert Bellarmine
- 1622 – Pope Gregory XV founds the Sacred Congregation for the Propagation of the Faith. This becomes the major Papal agency for coordinating and directing missionary work
- 1622–1642 Armand Jean du Plessis, Cardinal Richelieu
- 1623 – A stone monument over nine feet tall, 33 inches wide, and ten inches thick is unearthed in Ch'ang-ngan (Si-ngan-fu), China. Its inscription, written by a Syrian monk almost a thousand years earlier and in both Chinese characters and Persian script, begins with the words, "Let us praise the Lord that the [Christian] faith has been popular in China"; it told of the arrival of a missionary, A-lo-pen (Abraham), in AD 625.
- 1624 – Persecution intensifies in Japan with 50 Christians being burned alive in Edo (now called Tokyo)
- 1625 – Vietnam expels missionaries
- 1626 – After entering Japan in disguise, Jesuit missionary Francis Pacheco is captured and executed at Nagasaki
- 1627 – Alexander de Rhodes goes to Vietnam where in three years of ministry he baptizes 6,700 converts
- 1628 – Congregation for the Evangelization of Peoples established in Rome to train "native clergy" from all over the world
- 1629 – Franciscan missionary Alonzo Benavides founds Santa Clara de Capo on the border of Apache Indian country in what is now New Mexico
- 1630 – An attempt is made in the El Paso, Texas area to establish a mission among the Mansos Indians
- 1630 City upon a Hill, sermon by John Winthrop
- 1631 – Dutch missionary Abraham Rogerius (anglicized as Roger), who authored Open Door to the Secrets of Heathendom, begins 10 years of ministry among the Tamil people in the Dutch colony of Pulicat near Madras, India
- 1632 – Zuni Indians murder a group of Franciscan missionaries who had three years earlier established the first mission to the Zunis at Hawikuh in what is now New Mexico
- 1633 – Emperor Fasilides expels the Jesuit missionaries in Ethiopia; the German Lutheran Church sends Peter Heyling as the first Protestant missionary to Ethiopia.
- 1634 – Jesuit missionary Jean de Brèbeuf travels to the Petun nation (in Canada) and baptizes a 40-year-old man.
- 1634–37 Confessio catholica by Lutheran theologian Johann Gerhard
- 1635 – An expedition of Franciscans leaves Quito, Ecuador, to try to penetrate into Amazonia from the west. Though most of them will be killed along the way, a few will manage to arrive two years later on the Atlantic coast.
- 1636 – The Dominicans of Manila (the Philippines) organize a missionary expedition to Japan. They are arrested on one of the Okinawa islands and will be eventually condemned to death by the tribunal of Nagasaki.
- 1636 Founding of what was later known as Harvard University as a training school for ministers – the first of thousands of institutions of Christian higher education founded in the USA
- 1636–1638 Cornelius Jansen, bishop of Ypres, founder of Jansenism
- 1637 – When smallpox kills thousands of Native Americans, tribal medicine men blame European missionaries for the disaster
- 1637–1638 Shimabara Rebellion
- 1638 – Official ban of Christianity in Japan with death penalty; The Fountain Opened, a posthumous work of the influential Puritan writer Richard Sibbes is published, in which he says that the gospel must continue its journey "til it have gone over the whole world."
- 1638 Anne Hutchinson banished as a heretic from Massachusetts
- 1639 – The first women to New France as missionaries – three Ursuline Nuns – board the "St. Joseph" and set sail for New France
- 1640 – Jesuit missionaries arrive on the Caribbean island of Martinique; Jesuit Lodovico Buglio arrives in Sichuan
- 1641 – Jesuit missionary Cristoval de Acuna describes the Amazon River in a written report to the king of Spain
- 1641 John Cotton, advocate of theonomy, helps to establish the social constitution of the Massachusetts Bay Colony.
- 1642 – Catholic missionaries Isaac Jogues and René Goupil are captured by Mohawk Indians as they return to Huron country from Quebec. Goupil was tomahawked to death while Jogues will be held for a period of time as a slave. He used his slavery as an opportunity for missionary work
- 1643 – John Campanius, Lutheran missionary to the Indians, arrives in America on the Delaware River; Reformed pastor Johannes Megapolensis begins outreach to Native Americans while pastoring at Albany, New York
- 1643 Acta Sanctorum
- 1644 – John Eliot begins ministry to Algonquian Indians in North America
- 1644 Long Parliament directed that only Hebrew canon be read in the Church of England (effectively removed the Apocrypha)
- 1645 – After thirty years of work in Vietnam, the Jesuits are expelled from that country
- 1646 – After being accused of being a sorcerer, Jesuit missionary Isaac Jogues is killed by the Iroquois
- 1646 Westminster Standards produced by the Assembly, one of the first and undoubtedly the most important and lasting religious document drafted after the reconvention of the Parliament, also decreed Biblical canon
- 1647 – The Discalced Carmelites begin work on Madagascar
- 1648 – Baptism of Helena and other members of the emperial Ming family
- 1648 George Fox founds the Quaker movement
- 1649 – Society for the Propagation of the Gospel In New England formed to reach the Indians of New England
- 1650 – The destruction of Huronia by the Iroquois puts an end to the Jesuits' dream of making the Huron Indians the focal point of their evangelism
- 1650 James Ussher, calculates date of creation as October 23, 4004 BC.
- 1651 – Count Truchsess of Wetzhausen, prominent Lutheran layman, asks the theological faculty of Wittenberg why Lutherans are not sending out missionaries in obedience to the Great Commission
- 1652 – Jesuit Antonio Vieira returns to Brazil as a missionary where he will champion the cause of exploited indigenous peoples until being expelled by Portuguese colonists
- 1653 – A Mohawk war party captures Jesuit Joseph Poncet near Montreal. He is tortured and will be finally sent back with a message about peace overtures
- 1653–56 Raskol of the Russian Orthodox Church
- 1654 – John Eliot publishes a catechism for American Indians
- 1655 – Jinga or Zinga, princess of Matamba in Angola is converted; later she will write to the Pope urging that more missionaries be sent
- 1656 – First Quaker missionaries arrive in what is now Boston, Massachusetts
- 1657 – Thomas Mayhew Jr., is lost at sea during a voyage to England that was to combine an appeal for missionary funds with personal business
- 1658 – After the flight of the French missionaries from his area, chief Daniel Garakonthie of the Onondaga Indians, examines the customs of the French colonists and the doctrines of the missionaries and openly begins protecting Christians in his part of what is now New York
- 1659 – Jesuit Alexander de Rhodes establishes the Paris Foreign Missions Society
- 1660 – Christianity is introduced into Cambodia
- 1660–1685 King Charles II of England, restoration of monarchy, continuing through James II, reversed decision of Long Parliament of 1644, reinstating the Apocrypha, reversal not heeded by non-conformists
- 1661 – George Fox, founder of the Religious Society of Friends (Quakers) sends 3 missionaries to China (although they never reached the field)
- 1662 – French Jesuit missionary Julien Garnier sails for Canada
- 1663 – John Eliot's translation of the Bible into one of the Algonquian languages is published (the New Testament came out two years earlier). This Bible was the first complete Bible to be printed in the New World
- 1664 – Justinian Von Welz authors three powerful pamphlets on the need for world missions; he will go to Dutch Guinea (now called Surinam) where he will die after only three months
- 1665 – Japanese feudal landholders (called daimyōs) were ordered to follow the shogunate's example and to appoint inquisitors to do a yearly scutiny of Christians
- 1666 Paul Gerhardt, Lutheran pastor and hymnwriter is removed from his position as a pastor in Nikolaikirche in Berlin, when he refuses to accept "syncretistic" edict of the Elector Friedrich Wilhelm I of Brandenburg
- 1666 -John Eliot publishes his The Indian Grammar, a book written to assist in conversion work among the Indians. Described as "some bones and ribs preparation for such a work", Eliot intended his Grammar for missionaries wishing to learn the dialect spoken by the Massachusett Indians.
- 1667 – The first missionary to attempt to reach the Huaorani (or Aucas), Jesuit Pedro Suarez, is slain with spears
- 1668 – In a letter from his post in Canada, French missionary Jacques Bruyas laments his ignorance of the Oneida language: "What can a man do who does not understand their language, and who is not understood when he speaks. As yet, I do nothing but stammer; nevertheless, in four months I have baptized 60 persons, among whom there are only four adults, baptized in periculo mortis. All the rest are little children."
- 1669 – Eager to compete with the Jesuits for conversion of the Indian Nations on the western Great Lakes, Sulpilcian missionaries François Dollier de Casson and René Bréhant de Galinée set out from Montreal with twenty-seven men in seven canoes led by two canoes of Seneca Indians
- 1670 – Jesuits establish missions on the Orinoco River in Venezuela
- 1671 – Quaker missionaries arrive in the Carolinas
- 1672 – A chieftain on Guam kills Jesuit missionary Diego Luis de San Vitores and his Visayan assistant, Pedro Calungsod, for having baptized the chief's daughter without his permission (some accounts do say the girl's mother consented to the baptism)
- 1672 Greek Orthodox Synod of Jerusalem, decreed Biblical canon
- 1673 – French trader Louis Jolliet and missionary Jacques Marquette visit what is now the state of Illinois, where the latter establishes a mission for Native Americans
- 1674 – Vincentian mission to Madagascar collapses after 25 years of abortive effort
- 1675 – An uprising on the islands of Micronesia leads to the death of three Christian missionaries
- 1675 Philipp Jakob Spener publishes Pia Desideria, which becomes a manifesto for Pietism
- 1676 – Kateri Tekakwitha, who became known as the Lily of the Mohawks, is baptized by a Jesuit missionary. She, along with many other Native Americans, joins a missionary settlement in Canada where a syncretistic blend of ascetic indigenous and Catholic beliefs evolves.
- 1678 John Bunyan publishes Pilgrim's Progress
- 1678 -French missionaries Jean La Salle and Louis Hennepin discover Niagara Falls
- 1679 – Writing from Changzhou, newly arrived missionary Juan de Yrigoyen describes three Christian congregations flourishing in that Chinese city
- 1680 – The Pueblo Revolt begins in New Mexico with the killing of twenty-one Franciscan missionaries
- 1681 – After arriving in New Spain, Italian Jesuit Eusebio Kino soon becomes what one writer described as "the most picturesque missionary pioneer of all North America." A bundle of evangelistic zeal, Kino was also an explorer, astronomer, cartographer, mission builder, ranchman, cattle king, and defender of the frontier
- 1682 – 13 missionaries go to "remote cities" in East Siberia
- 1682 Avvakum, leader of the Old Believers, burned at the stake in the Far North of Russia
- 1683 – Missionary Louis Hennepin returns to France after exploring Minnesota and being held captive by the Dakota to write the first book about Minnesota, Description de la Louisiane
- 1684 – Louis XIV of France sends Jesuit missionaries to China bearing gifts from the collections of the Louvre and the Palace of Versailles
- 1684 Roger Williams, advocate of Separation of church and state, founder of Providence, Rhode Island
- 1685 – Consecration of first Catholic bishop of Chinese origin
- 1685 Edict of Fontainebleau outlaws Protestantism in France
- 1685 Orthodoxy introduced to Beijing by Russian Orthodox Church
- 1686 – Russian Orthodox monks arrive in China as missionaries
- 1687 – French activity begins in what is now Côte d'Ivoire when missionaries land at Assinie
- 1688 – New Testament translated into the Malay language (the first Bible translation into a language of southeast Asia)
- 1689 – Calusa Indian chief from what is the state of Florida visits Cuba to discuss idea of having missionaries come to his people
- 1690 – First Franciscan missionaries arrive in Texas
- 1691 – Christian Faith Society for the West Indies was organized with a focus on evangelizing African slaves
- 1692 – Chinese Kangxi Emperor permits the Jesuits to freely preach Christianity, converting whom they wish
- 1692 Salem witch trials in Colonial America
- 1692–1721 Chinese Rites controversy
- 1693 – Jesuit missionary John de Britto is publicly beheaded in India
- 1693 Jacob Amman founder of Amish
- 1694 – Missionary and explorer Eusebio Kino becomes the first European to enter the Tucson, Arizona basin and create a lasting settlement
- 1695 – China's first Russian Orthodox church building is consecrated
- 1696 – Jesuit missionary François Pinet founds the Mission of the Guardian Angel near what is today Chicago. The mission was abandoned in 1700 when missionary efforts seemed fruitless
- 1697 – To evangelize the English colonies, Thomas Bray, an Anglican preacher who made several missionary trips to North America, begins laying the groundwork for what will be the Society for the Propagation of the Gospel in Foreign Parts
- 1698 – Society for Promoting Christian Knowledge organized by Anglicans
- 1699 – Priests of the Quebec Seminary of Foreign Missions establish a mission among the Tamaroa Indians at Cahokia in what is now the state of Illinois
- 1700 – After a Swedish missionary's sermon in Pennsylvania, one Native American posed such searching questions that the episode was reported in a 1731 history of the Swedish church in America. The interchange is noted in Benjamin Franklin's Remarks Concerning the Savages of North America (1784).

== See also ==
- Algonquian Bible
- History of Christianity
- History of Protestantism
- Baroque, Enlightenment and revolutions
- Ottoman Empire
- Renaissance and Reformation
- History of Oriental Orthodoxy
- Timeline of the English Reformation
- Timeline of Christianity
- Timeline of Christian missions
- Timeline of the Roman Catholic Church
- Chronological list of saints and blesseds in the 17th century

History of Christianity: The Reformation
Preceded by: Christianity in the 16th century / 17th century / Followed by: Christianity in the 18th century
BC	C1	C2	C3	C4	C5	C6	C7	C8	C9	C10
C11	C12	C13	C14	C15	C16	C17	C18	C19	C20	C21
