= Edict of Ayutthaya on missionary activities =

The 1731 Edict on Missionary Activities was a significant decree issued by King Thai Sa in the Kingdom of Ayutthaya (modern-day Thailand). This edict was part of a broader context of limiting religious diversity in Southeast Asia during the 18th century, particularly in the capital of Siam, nowadays Thailand.

While the original inscription was destroyed later in the 18th century, Latin and French translations of it ("la pierre de scandale", i.e. the stumbling stone) are known through the work of French historian Adrien Launay and other French sources translated to Thai.

== Background ==
During the early 18th century, Ayutthaya was a prominent center for trade and diplomacy, attracting European missionaries, particularly from France and Portugal. These missionaries aimed to spread Christianity and establish communities among the local population. The presence of European powers and their religious representatives influenced local politics, culture, and religion. After a certain openness during the 17th century however, hostility to Christianity grew in the early to mid-eighteenth century.

This edict was part of a broader context of religious persecution occurring in Southeast Asia during the 18th century. Already, any missionary work was forbidden in China since the Yongzheng emperor's edict of 1724.

== Content of the Edict ==
In 1730, a persecution against Christians broke out in Siam, triggered by the apostasy of Laurent Teng, a seminarian of Chinese origin. The son of a former high-ranking official, Teng had been entrusted by his mother to Mgr Louis Champion de Cicé, with the king’s approval, to be educated at the Seminary. After ten years of study and his promotion to the clerical tonsure, his family, influenced by the king’s brother who was hostile to the missionaries, demanded his return. Subjected to an interrogation by a prince, Teng initially defended his Christian faith, stating that it seemed just to him and that his God was all-powerful. However, under pressure and after being beaten, he renounced his faith, abandoned his cassock, trampled on the cross, and donned the robe of a Buddhist talapoin.

Backed by the prime minister, the persecutor then targeted the Seminary, the church, and the Mahapram house, using writings by Mgr Louis Laneau against Buddhism as a pretext. In October 1730, Mgr Jean-Jacques Tessier de Quéralay, accompanied by M. Lemaire, two deacons, and a sub-deacon, was summoned before the Royal Tribunal. They underwent a lengthy interrogation and were pressed to sign four articles prohibiting the writing of Catholic works in Siamese, Khmer or Pali script, criticizing the Siamese religion, preaching to Siamese, Peguans, or Laotians, or converting them. Facing the threat of beheading, Mgr de Quéralay firmly stated that he would rather die or leave the country than comply. The other missionaries shared his stance, defying the authorities. The 1731 Edict specifically addressed the activities of Christian missionaries in Ayutthaya. It sought to regulate their operations by imposing restrictions on their ability to convert locals and establish places of worship. The edict aimed to balance the growing influence of foreign religious practices with the preservation of traditional Buddhist beliefs and the socio-political structure of the kingdom.

In retaliation, Christians were arrested and mistreated, searches were conducted at the Seminary, and books were confiscated. A stone inscribed with the four articles, dubbed the "stone of scandal," was placed in the Seminary church. The persecutions and harassments continued until the king’s death in January 1733.

== Legacy ==
The 1731 Edict is often viewed as a crucial moment in the history of Christianity in Thailand, highlighting the complex interplay between indigenous beliefs and external religious pressures. It set a precedent for future interactions between the Thai state and missionary organizations, influencing the trajectory of religious practices in the region for years to come, as related by French missionary bishop Jean-Baptiste Pallegoix. The French missionary Philippe Cirou took advantage of the unrest during the first Burmese invasion in 1865 to destroy the stone erected in 1731 in front of the Juthia church, known as the "stone of scandal" because it bore an inscription insulting to Catholicism.

On October 13, 1774, a new royal edict forbade the Peguans and the Siamese from becoming Christians or Muslims, in line with the edict of 1731.

From 1775, the missionaries lost the support of the king in the rebuilding of the mission. The problem this time came from the oath of loyalty to the king, considered to be part of the fundamental law of Siam. During the ceremony, the mandarins had to drink water that was supposed to eliminate traitors to the king, with Buddha as a witness. In 1775, Bishop Le Bon specified that Christians were forbidden to drink the water or even pretend to. He wrote a letter to the king to inform him of his decision. Instead, he proposed organizing a Christian ceremony of oath to the king. In response, King Taksin imprisoned the bishop and two priests from Bangkok. The latter received a hundred lashes with a rattan in the presence of the king, then were put in the cangue, chained and detained until 1776.

Despite not always being enforced, and being passed on through unspoken trauma alone as missionaries discretely went one with their work, the Edict was in someway overturned by the much more liberal 1878 by the Edict of Religious Toleration. First announced by King Chulalongkorn in 1878, the edict says that whoever wishes to embrace any religion could from there onwards.
