= Christianity in the modern era =

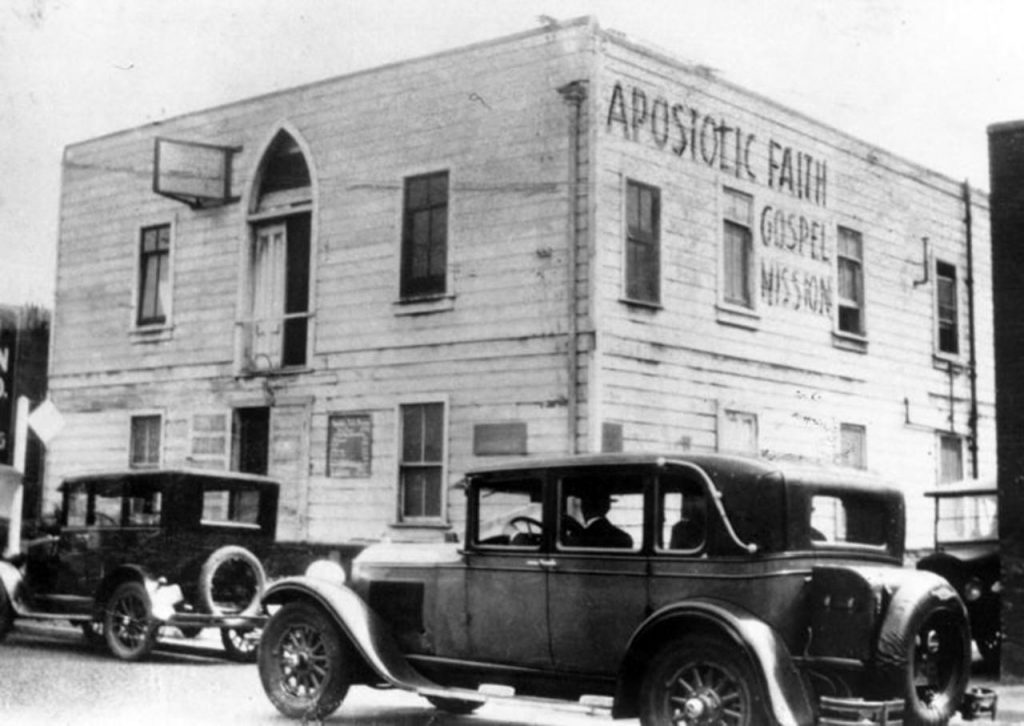
The mission at 312 Azusa Street in 1907, Los Angeles, California, the United States, considered to be the birthplace of Pentecostalism.

The history of modern Christianity concerns the Christian religion from the beginning of the 15th century to the end of World War II. It can be divided into the early modern period and the late modern period. The history of Christianity in the early modern period coincides with the Age of Exploration, and is usually taken to begin with the Protestant Reformation c. 1517–1525 (usually rounded down to 1500) and ending in the late 18th century with the onset of the Industrial Revolution and the events leading up to the French Revolution of 1789. It includes the Protestant Reformation, the Counter-Reformation and the Catholic Church and the Age of Discovery. Christianity expanded throughout the world during the Age of Exploration. Christianity has thus become the world's largest religion.

== Early modern period (c. 1500 – c. 1750) ==
=== Orthodoxy under Ottoman rule ===
In 1453, Constantinople fell to the Ottoman Empire. Under Ottoman rule, the Greek Orthodox Church acquired substantial power as an autonomous millet. The ecumenical patriarch was the religious and administrative ruler of the entire "Greek Orthodox nation" (Ottoman administrative unit), which encompassed all the Eastern Orthodox subjects of the Empire. As a result of the Ottoman conquest and the fall of Constantinople, the entire Orthodox communion of the Balkans and the Near East became suddenly isolated from the West.

For the next four hundred years, it would be confined within a hostile Islamic world, with which it had little in common religiously or culturally. This geographical and intellectual confinement partially explains why the voice of Eastern Orthodoxy was not heard during the Reformation in sixteenth-century Europe. As a result, the theological debates surrounding the reformation are largely alien to the Orthodox church. Neither Reformation nor Counter-Reformation, in the Western sense, are present in the Orthodox Church's historical theology.

The new Ottoman government that arose from the ashes of Byzantine civilisation was neither primitive nor barbaric. Islam not only recognised Jesus as a great prophet, but tolerated Christians as another People of the Book. As such, the Church was not extinguished nor was its canonical and hierarchical organisation significantly disrupted. Its administration continued to function. One of the first things that Mehmet the Conqueror did was to allow the Church to elect a new patriarch, Gennadius Scholarius. The Hagia Sophia and the Parthenon, which had been Christian churches for nearly a millennium were, admittedly, converted into mosques, yet countless other churches, both in Constantinople and elsewhere, remained in Christian hands. Moreover, it is striking that the patriarch's and the hierarchy's position was considerably strengthened and their power increased. They were endowed with civil as well as ecclesiastical power over all Christians in Ottoman territories. Because Islamic law makes no distinction between nationality and religion, all Christians, regardless of their language or nationality, were considered a single millet, or nation. The patriarch, as the highest ranking hierarch, was thus invested with civil and religious authority and made ethnarch, head of the entire Christian Orthodox population. Practically, this meant that all Orthodox Churches within Ottoman territory were under the control of Constantinople. Thus, the authority and jurisdictional frontiers of the patriarch were enormously enlarged.

However, these rights and privileges (see Dhimmitude), including freedom of worship and religious organisation, were often established in principle but seldom corresponded to reality. The legal privileges of the patriarch and the Church depended, in fact, on the whim and mercy of the Sultan and the Sublime Porte, while all Christians were viewed as little more than second-class citizens. Moreover, Turkish corruption and brutality were not a myth. That it was the "infidel" Christian who experienced this more than anyone else is not in doubt. Nor were pogroms of Christians in these centuries unknown (see Greco-Turkish relations). Devastating, too, for the Church was that it could not bear witness to Christ. Missionary work among Moslems was dangerous and indeed impossible, whereas conversion to Islam was entirely legal and permissible. Converts to Islam who returned to Orthodoxy were put to death as apostates. No new churches could be built and even the ringing of church bells was prohibited. Education of the clergy and the Christian population either ceased altogether or was reduced to the most rudimentary elements.

==== Corruption ====
The Orthodox Church found itself subject to the Turkish system of corruption. The patriarchal throne was frequently sold to the highest bidder, while new patriarchal investiture was accompanied by heavy payment to the government. In order to recoup their losses, patriarchs and bishops taxed the local parishes and their clergy. Nor was the patriarchal throne ever secure. Few patriarchs between the fifteenth and the nineteenth centuries died a natural death while in office. The forced abdications, exiles, hangings, drownings, and poisonings of patriarchs are well documented. But if the patriarch's position was precarious so was the hierarchy's. The hanging of patriarch Gregory V from the gate of the patriarchate on Easter Sunday 1821 was accompanied by the execution of two metropolitans and twelve bishops.

==== Devshirmeh ====
Devshirmeh was the system of the collection of young boys from conquered Christian lands by the Ottoman sultans as a form of regular taxation in order to build a loyal army (formerly largely composed of war captives) and the class of (military) administrators called the "Janissaries", or other servants such as tellak in hamams. The word devşirme means "collecting, gathering" in Ottoman Turkish. Boys delivered to the Ottomans in this way were called ghilmán or acemi oglanlar ("novice boys").

=== Age of Enlightenment (1640–1740) ===
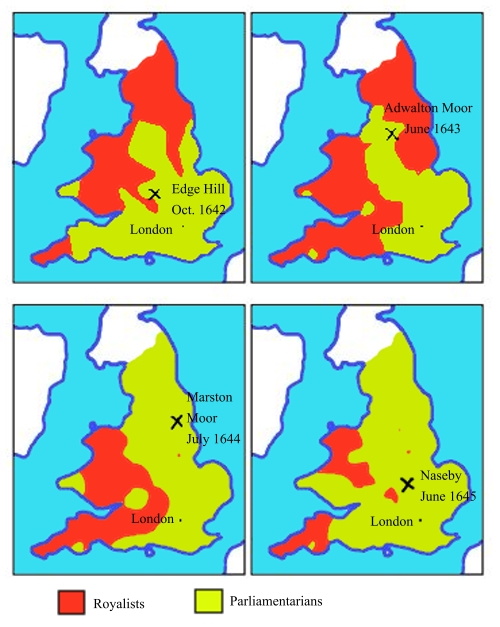
Maps of territory held by Royalists (red) and Parliamentarians (green), 1642–1645

The Enlightenment constituted a new challenge of the Church. Unlike the Protestant Reformation, which questioned certain Christian doctrines, the Enlightenment questioned Christianity as a whole. Generally, it elevated human reason above divine revelation and down-graded religious authorities such as the papacy based on it

==== Puritan movement ====
The Counter-Reformation on the Continent and the growth of a Puritan party dedicated to further Protestant reform polarized the Elizabethan Age, although it was not until the 1640s that England underwent religious strife comparable to that which its neighbours had suffered some generations before.

The early Puritan movement (late 16th century-17th century) was Reformed or Calvinist and was a movement for reform in the Church of England. Its origins lay in the discontent with the Elizabethan Religious Settlement. The desire was for the Church of England to resemble more closely the Protestant churches of Europe, especially Geneva. The Puritans objected to ornaments and ritual in the churches as idolatrous (vestments, surplices, organs, genuflection), which they castigated as "popish pomp and rags". (See Vestments controversy.) They also objected to ecclesiastical courts. They refused to endorse completely all of the ritual directions and formulas of the Book of Common Prayer; the imposition of its liturgical order by legal force and inspection sharpened Puritanism into a definite opposition movement.

The later Puritan movement were often referred to as Dissenters and Nonconformists and eventually led to the formation of various Reformed denominations.

The most famous and well-known emigration to America was the migration of the Puritans, or pilgrims, left England so that they could live in an area with Puritanism established as the exclusive civic religion. Though they had left England because of the suppression of their religious practice, most Puritans had thereafter originally settled in the Low Countries but found the licentiousness there, where the state hesitated from enforcing religious practice, as unacceptable, so with hopes of a Puritan utopia, they set out to establish the English colonies of New England, which later became the United States.

These Puritan separatists were also known as "the pilgrims". After establishing a colony at Plymouth (in what would become later Massachusetts) in 1620, the Puritan pilgrims received a charter from the King of England which legitimized their colony, allowing them to do trade and commerce with merchants in England, in accordance with the principles of mercantilism. This successful, though initially quite difficult, colony marked the beginning of the Protestant presence in America (the earlier French, Spanish and Portuguese settlements had been Catholic), and became a kind of oasis of spiritual and economic freedom, to which persecuted Protestants and other minorities from the British Isles and Europe (and later, from all over the world) fled to for peace, freedom and opportunity.

The original intent of the colonists was to establish spiritual Puritanism, which had been denied to them in England and the rest of Europe to engage in peaceful commerce with England and the Native American Indians and to Christianize the peoples of the Americas.

The most famous colonisation by Protestants in the New World was that of English Puritans in North America. Unlike the Spanish or French, the English colonists made surprisingly little effort to evangelise the native peoples.

==== Roman Catholic missions ====
The Roman Catholic Church established a number of Missions to convert the indigenous peoples. At the same time, missionaries such those from Jesuits, Augustinians, Franciscans and Dominicans were moving into Asia and the Far East. The Portuguese sent missions into Africa. Matteo Ricci's Jesuit mission to China was relatively peaceful and focused on adopted the Catholic faith to Chinese thinking, permitting among others the veneration of the dead. The Vatican disagreed and forbade any adaptation in the so-called Chinese Rites controversy in 1692 and 1742. The expansion of the Catholic Portuguese Empire and Spanish Empire with a significant roled played by the Roman Catholic Church led to the Christianization of the indigenous populations of the Americas such as the Aztecs and Incas, but, until the 19th century, missions had to work under the Spanish and Portuguese governments and military.

== Late modern period (c. 1750 – c. 1945) ==
=== Revivalism (1720–1906) ===
Revivalism refers to the Calvinist and Wesleyan revival, called the Great Awakening, in North America which saw the development of evangelical Congregationalist, Presbyterian, Baptist, and new Methodist churches. When the movement eventually waned, it gave rise to new Restorationist movements.

==== Great Awakenings (18th–20th century) ====
The First Great Awakening was a wave of religious enthusiasm among Protestants in the American colonies c. 1730–1740, emphasising the traditional Reformed virtues of Godly preaching, rudimentary liturgy, and a deep sense of personal guilt and redemption by Christ Jesus. Historian Sydney E. Ahlstrom saw it as part of a "great international Protestant upheaval" that also created Pietism in Germany, the Evangelical Revival, and Methodism in England. It centred on reviving the spirituality of established congregations, and mostly affected Congregational, Presbyterian, Dutch Reformed, German Reformed, Baptist, and Methodist churches, while also spreading within the slave population. The Second Great Awakening (1800–1830s), unlike the first, focused on the unchurched and sought to instil in them a deep sense of personal salvation as experienced in revival meetings. It also sparked the beginnings of the Restoration Movement, the Latter Day Saint movement, Adventism and the Holiness movement. The Third Great Awakening began from 1857 and was most notable for taking the movement throughout the world, especially in English speaking countries. The final group to emerge from the "great awakenings" in North America was Pentecostalism, which had its roots in the Methodist, Wesleyan, and Holiness movements, and began in 1906 on Azusa Street, in Los Angeles. Pentecostalism would later lead to the Charismatic movement, which is considered by some to be part of a Fourth Great Awakening.

==== French Revolution and worship of Reason ====
Matters grew still worse with the violent anti-clericalism of the French Revolution. Direct attacks on the wealth of the Catholic Church and associated grievances led to the wholesale nationalisation of church property and attempts to establish a state-run church. Large numbers of priests refused to take an oath of compliance to the National Assembly, leading to the Catholic Church being outlawed and replaced by a new religion of the worship of "Reason" along with a new French Republican Calendar. In this period, all monasteries were destroyed, 30,000 priests were exiled and hundreds more were killed.

When Pope Pius VI sided against the revolution in the First Coalition, Napoleon Bonaparte invaded Italy. The 82-year-old pope was taken as a prisoner to France in February 1799 and died in Valence August 29, 1799 after six months of captivity. To win popular support for his rule, Napoleon re-established the Catholic Church in France through the Concordat of 1801. All over Europe, the end of the Napoleonic wars signaled by the Congress of Vienna, brought Catholic revival, renewed enthusiasm, and new respect for the papacy following the depredations of the previous era.

==== Restorationism ====
Restorationism refers to various unaffiliated movements that considered contemporary Christianity, in all its forms, to be a deviation from the true, original Christianity, which these groups then attempted to "Reconstruct", often using the Book of Acts as a "guidebook" of sorts. Restorationism developed out of the Second Great Awakening and is historically connected to the Protestant Reformation, but differs in that Restorationists do not usually describe themselves as "reforming" a Christian church continuously existing from the time of Jesus, but as restoring the Church that they believe was lost at some point. The name Restoration is also used to describe the Latter-day Saints (Mormons) and the Jehovah's Witness Movement.

===== Latter Day Saints =====
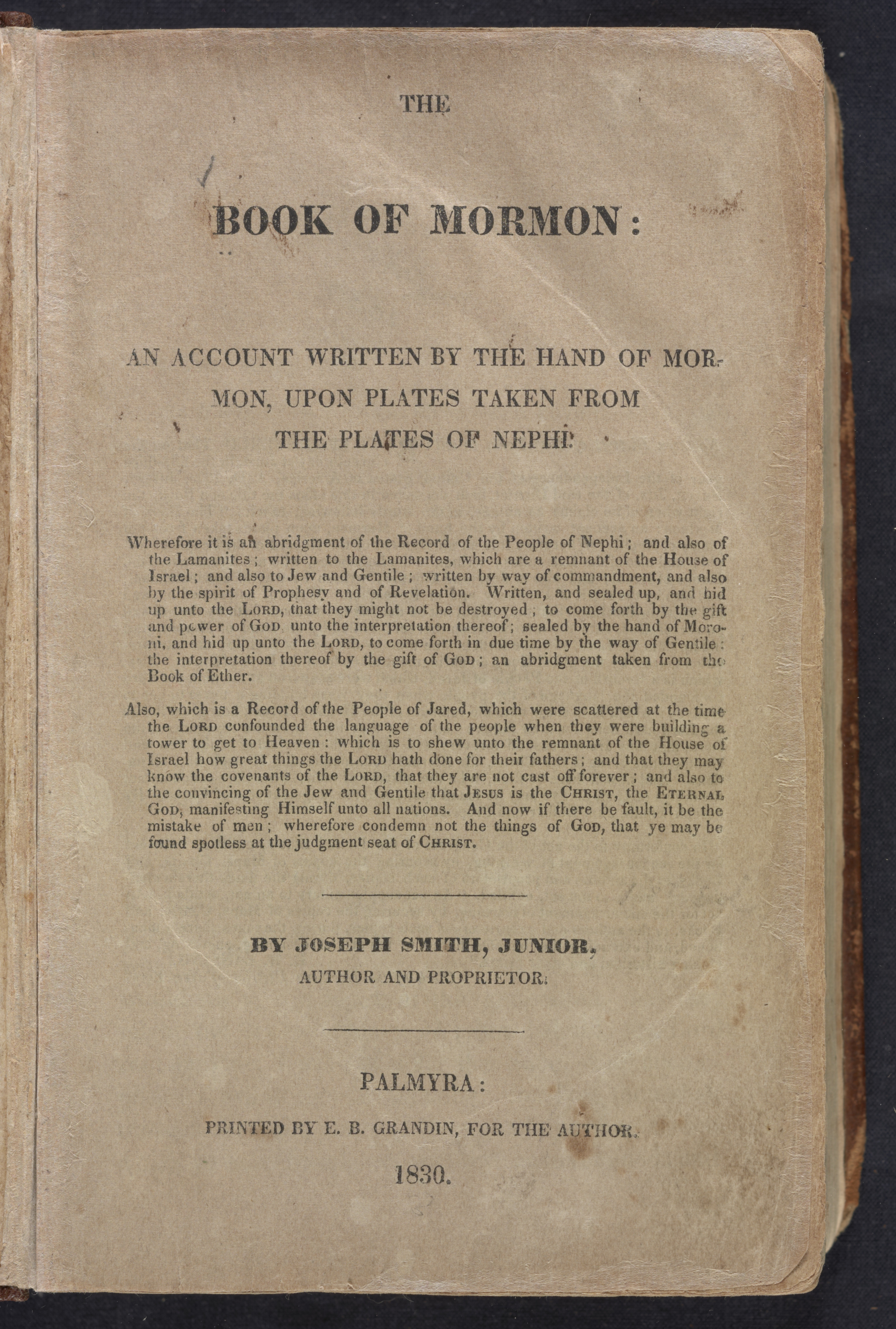
Cover page of The Book of Mormon from an original 1830 edition, by Joseph Smith Jr.

The driving force behind and founder of the Latter Day Saint movement was Joseph Smith Jr., and to a lesser extent, during the movement's first two years, Oliver Cowdery. Throughout his life, Smith told of an experience he had as a boy having seen God the Father and Jesus Christ as two separate beings, who told him that the true church had been lost and would be restored through him, and that he would be given the authority to organize and lead the true Church of Christ. Smith and Cowdery also explained that the angels John the Baptist, Peter, James and John visited them in 1829 and gave them authority to reestablish the Church of Christ and in 1838 Joseph Smith announced that he had received a revelation from God officially expanding the common name to the Church of Jesus Christ of Latter Day Saints.

Smith first published the Book of Mormon in March 1830, which LDS members believe was translated from Golden Plates buried in the ground, and contains a record of Americas between about 600 BC and 400 AD and an original church of Jesus therein.

In 1844, William Law and several other Latter Day Saints in church leadership positions publicly denounced Smith's secret practice of polygamy in the controversial Nauvoo Expositor, and formed their own church. The city council of Nauvoo, Illinois subsequently had the printing press of the Expositor destroyed. In spite of Smith's later offer to pay damages for destroyed property, critics of Smith and the church considered the destruction heavy-handed. Some called for the Latter Day Saints to be either expelled or destroyed. Following Smith's assassination by a mob in Carthage, Illinois, some prominent members of the church claimed to be Smith's legitimate successor.

These various claims resulted in a succession crisis, in which the majority of church members followed Brigham Young, he being the senior Apostle of the church; others followed Sidney Rigdon or James Strang. The crisis resulted in several permanent schisms as well as the formation of occasional splinter groups, some of which no longer exist. These various groups are occasionally referred to under two geographical headings: "Prairie Saints" (those that remained in the Midwest United States) and "Rocky Mountain Saints" (those who followed Brigham Young to what would later become the state of Utah). Today, there are many schism organizations who regard themselves as a part of the Latter Day Saint movement, though in most cases they do not acknowledge the other branches as valid and regard their own tradition as the only correct and authorized version of the church Smith founded. The vast majority of Latter Day Saints belong to the largest denomination, The Church of Jesus Christ of Latter-day Saints (LDS Church) which claims 16 million members worldwide. The second-largest denomination is the Community of Christ, which reports over 250,000 members.

=== Russian Orthodoxy ===
Orthodoxy was very strong in Russia, which had recently acquired an autocephalous status, and as the only part of the Orthodox communion which remained outside the control of the Ottoman Empire; Moscow called itself the Third Rome, as the heir of Constantinople. In 1721 Tsar Peter I abolished completely the patriarchate and so the Russian Orthodox Church effectively became a department of the government, ruled by a Most Holy Synod composed of senior bishops and lay bureaucrats appointed by the Tsar himself. This continued until the 20th century.

==== Russian Orthodox Church in the Russian Empire ====
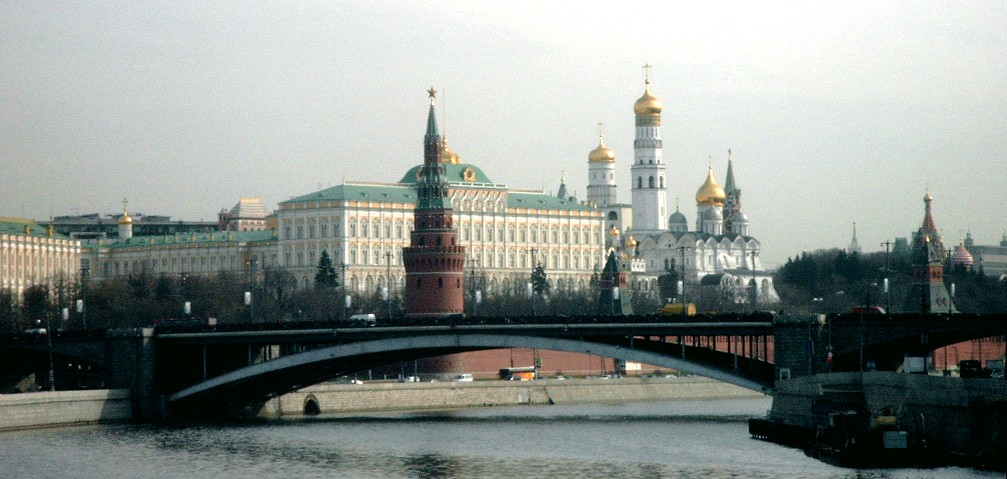
Churches of the Moscow Kremlin, as seen from the Balchug

The Russian Orthodox Church held a privileged position in the Russian Empire, expressed in the motto, Orthodoxy, Autocracy, and Populism, of the late Russian Empire. At the same time, it was placed under the control of the Tsar by the Church reform of Peter I in the 18th century. Its governing body was Most Holy Synod, which was run by an official (titled Ober-Procurator) appointed by the Tsar himself.

The church was involved in the various campaigns of russification, and accused of the involvement in anti-Jewish pogroms. In the case of anti-Semitism and the anti-Jewish pogroms, no evidence is given of the direct participation of the church, and many Russian Orthodox clerics, including senior hierarchs, openly defended persecuted Jews, at least from the second half of the nineteenth century. Also, the Church has no official position on Judaism as such.

The Church was allowed to impose taxes on the peasants.

The Church, like the Tsarist state was seen as an enemy of the people by the Bolsheviks and other Russian revolutionaries.

==== Russian Orthodox Church in the Soviet Union ====
The Russian Orthodox Church collaborated with the White Army in the Russian Civil War (see White movement) after the October Revolution. This may have further strengthened the Bolshevik animus against the church.

After the October Revolution of 7 November 1917 (October 25 Old Calendar) there was a movement within the Soviet Union to unite all of the people of the world under Communist rule (see Communist International). This included the Eastern European bloc countries as well as the Balkan States. Since some of these Slavic states tied their ethnic heritage to their ethnic churches, both the peoples and their church where targeted by the Soviet. The Soviets' official religious stance was one of "religious freedom or tolerance", though the state established atheism as the only scientific truth. Criticism of atheism was strictly forbidden and sometimes lead to imprisonment.

The Soviet Union was the first state to have as an ideological objective the elimination of religion. Toward that end, the Communist regime confiscated church property, ridiculed religion, harassed believers, and propagated atheism in the schools. Actions toward particular religions, however, were determined by State interests, and most organised religions were never outlawed. Some actions against Orthodox priests and believers along with execution included torture being sent to prison camps, labour camps or mental hospitals. The result of this state atheism was to transform the Church into a persecuted and martyred Church. In the first five years after the Bolshevik revolution, 28 bishops and 1,200 priests were executed. This included people like the Grand Duchess Elizabeth Fyodorovna who was at this point a monastic. Along with her murder was Grand Duke Sergei Mikhailovich Romanov; the Princes Ioann Konstantinovich, Konstantin Konstantinovich, Igor Konstantinovich and Vladimir Pavlovich Paley; Grand Duke Sergei's secretary, Fyodor Remez; and Varvara Yakovleva, a sister from the Grand Duchess Elizabeth's convent. They were herded into the forest, pushed into an abandoned mineshaft and grenades were then hurled into the mineshaft. Her remains were buried in Jerusalem, in the Church of Maria Magdalene.

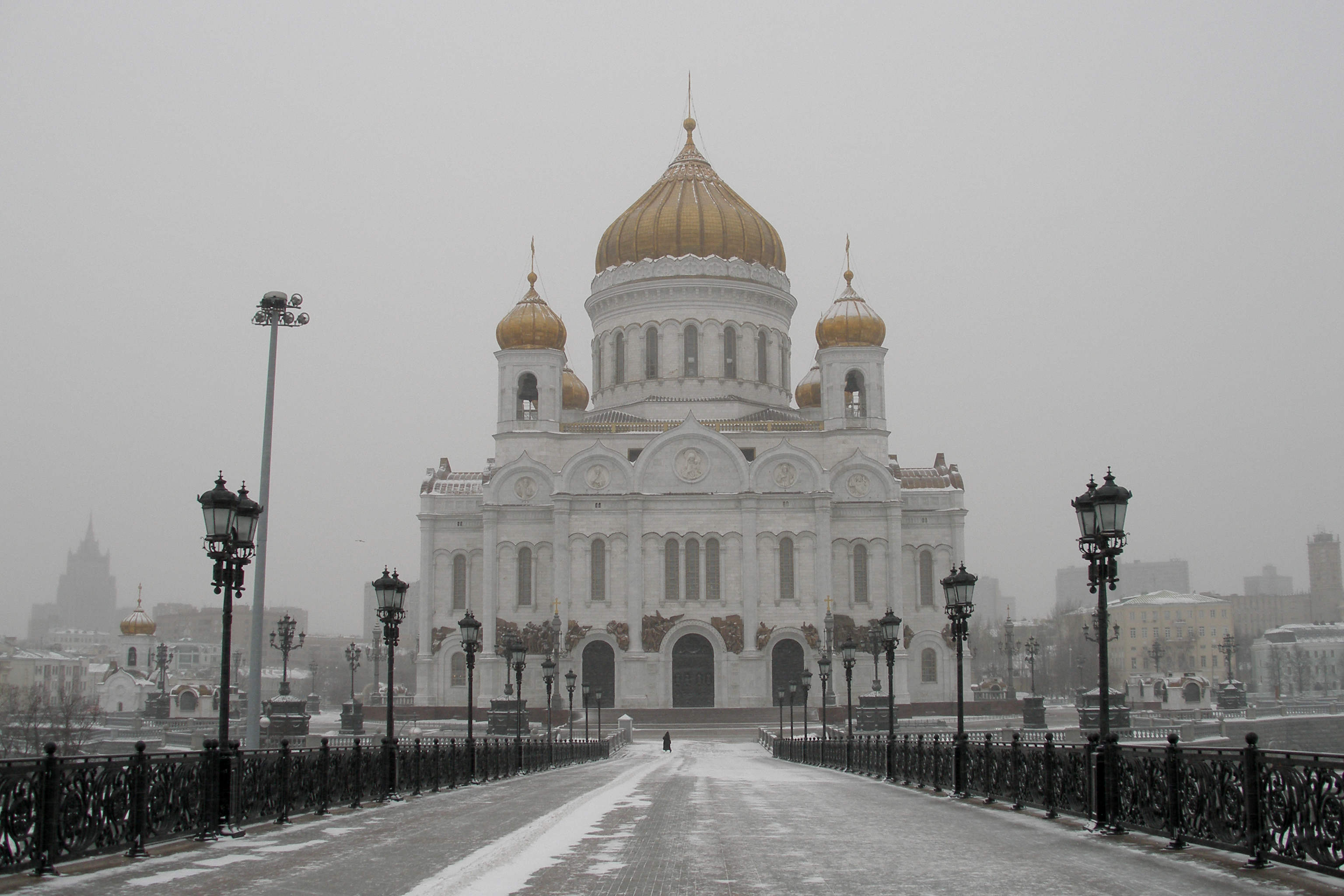
Christ the Saviour Cathedral Moscow after reconstruction

The main target of the anti-religious campaign in the 1920s and 1930s was the Russian Orthodox Church, which had the largest number of faithful. Nearly its entire clergy, and many of its believers, were shot or sent to labor camps. Theological schools were closed, and church publications were prohibited. In the period between 1927 and 1940, the number of Orthodox Churches in the Russian Republic fell from 29,584 to less than 500. Between 1917 and 1940, 130,000 Orthodox priests were arrested. Of these, 95,000 were put to death, executed by firing squad. Father Pavel Florensky was one of the New-martyrs of this particular period.

After Nazi Germany's attack on the Soviet Union in 1941, Joseph Stalin revived the Russian Orthodox Church to intensify patriotic support for the war effort. By 1957 about 22,000 Russian Orthodox churches had become active. But in 1959 Nikita Khrushchev initiated his own campaign against the Russian Orthodox Church and forced the closure of about 12,000 churches. By 1985 fewer than 7,000 churches remained active. Members of the church hierarchy were jailed or forced out, their places taken by docile clergy, many of whom had ties with the KGB.

In the Soviet Union, in addition to the methodical closing and destruction of churches, the charitable and social work formerly done by ecclesiastical authorities was taken over by the state. As with all private property, Church owned property was confiscated into public use. The few places of worship left to the Church were legally viewed as state property which the government permitted the church to use. After the advent of state funded universal education, the Church was not permitted to carry on educational, instructional activity for children. For adults, only training for church-related occupations was allowed. Outside of sermons during the celebration of the divine liturgy it could not instruct or evangelise to the faithful or its youth. Catechism classes, religious schools, study groups, Sunday schools and religious publications were all illegal and or banned. This persecution continued, even after the death of Stalin until the dissolution of the Soviet Union in 1991. This caused many religious tracts to be circulated as illegal literature or samizdat. Since the fall of the Soviet Union there have been many New-martyrs added as Saints from the yoke of atheism.

==== Diaspora emigration to the West ====
One of the most striking developments in modern historical Orthodoxy is the dispersion of Orthodox Christians to the West. Emigration from Greece and the Near East in the last hundred years has created a sizable Orthodox diaspora in Western Europe, North and South America, and Australia. In addition, the Bolshevik Revolution forced thousands of Russian exiles westward. As a result, Orthodoxy's traditional frontiers have been profoundly modified. Millions of Orthodox are no longer geographically "eastern" since they live permanently in their newly adopted countries in the West. Nonetheless, they remain Eastern Orthodox in their faith and practice.

=== Western Christianity in the 20th century ===
==== Fascism ====
Fascism describes certain related political regimes in 20th-century Europe, especially the Nazi Germany of Hitler, the Fascist Italy of Mussolini and the falangist Spain of Franco. About Italian Fascism Pope Pius XI is said to have been moderately sceptic and G. K. Chesterton friendly but critical. In the Spanish Civil War Roman Catholics internationally were mainly in support of either neutral or on Franco's side, due to Azaña's de facto toleration of anti-clerical violence in and just before this conflict. Dollfuss in Austria was the ideal politician realising Pope Pius XI's Quadragesimo anno.

==== Nazism ====
The position of Christians in Nazi Fascism is highly complex.

Regarding the matter, historian Derek Holmes wrote, "There is no doubt that the Catholic districts, resisted the lure of National Socialism [Nazism] far better than the Protestant ones." Pope Pius XI declared – Mit brennender Sorge – that Fascist governments had hidden "pagan intentions" and expressed the irreconcilability of the Catholic position and Totalitarian Fascist State Worship, which placed the nation above God and fundamental human rights and dignity. His declaration that "Spiritually, [Christians] are all Semites" prompted the Nazis to give him the title "Chief Rabbi of the Christian World".

Catholic priests were executed in concentration camps alongside Jews; for example, 2,600 Catholic priests were imprisoned in Dachau, and 2,000 of them were executed. A further 2,700 Polish priests were executed (a quarter of all Polish priests), and 5,350 Polish nuns were either displaced, imprisoned, or executed. Many Catholic laypeople and clergy played notable roles in sheltering Jews during the Holocaust, including Pope Pius XII (1876–1958). The head rabbi of Rome became a Catholic in 1945 and, in honour of the actions the pope undertook to save Jewish lives, he took the name Eugenio (the pope's first name). A former Israeli consul in Italy claimed: "The Catholic Church saved more Jewish lives during the war than all the other churches, religious institutions, and rescue organisations put together."

In Austria there was strong Catholic resistance to National Socialism. The outstanding resistance group is that around the priest Heinrich Maier. This Catholic resistance group very successfully passed on plans and production sites for V-2 rockets, Tiger tanks and aircraft to the Allies. From the fall of 1943 at least, these transmissions informed the Allies about the exact site plans of German production plants. With the location sketches of the manufacturing facilities, the Allied bombers were given precise air strikes. In contrast to many other German resistance groups, the Maier Group informed very early about the mass murder of Jews through their contacts with the Semperit factory near Auschwitz. In total, as Austrian resistance fighters, 706 priests were imprisoned in the Nazi regime, 128 in concentration camps and 20 to 90 executed or murdered in the concentration camp. In 1940 the SS designated Dachau concentration camp with its own priest block as a central internment place for Christian clergymen who were often severely tortured. In addition, there were always special riots against the priests.

The relationship between Nazism and Protestantism, especially the German Lutheran Church, was complex. Though the majority of Protestant church leaders in Germany supported the Nazis' growing anti-Jewish activities, some, such as Dietrich Bonhoeffer (a Lutheran pastor) were strongly opposed to the Nazis. Bonhoeffer was later found guilty in the conspiracy to assassinate Hitler and executed.

==== Ecumenism ====
Ecumenism broadly refers to movements between Christian groups to establish a degree of unity through dialogue. "Ecumenism" is derived from Greek οἰκουμένη (oikoumene), which means "the inhabited world", but more figuratively something like "universal oneness". The movement can be distinguished into Catholic and Protestant movements, with the latter characterised by a redefined ecclesiology of "denominationalism" (which the Catholic Church, among others, rejects).

===== Catholic ecumenism =====
Over the last century, a number of moves have been made to reconcile the schism between the Catholic Church and the Eastern Orthodox churches. Although progress has been made, concerns over papal primacy and the independence of the smaller Orthodox churches has blocked a final resolution of the schism.

On 30 November 1895, Pope Leo XIII published the Apostolic Letter Orientalium Dignitas (On the Churches of the East) safeguarding the importance and continuance of the Eastern traditions for the whole Church. On 7 December 1965, a Joint Catholic-Orthodox Declaration of Pope Paul VI and the Ecumenical Patriarch Athenagoras I was issued lifting the mutual excommunications of 1054.

Some of the most difficult questions in relations with the ancient Eastern Churches concern some doctrine (i.e. Filioque, Scholasticism, functional purposes of asceticism, the essence of God, Hesychasm, Fourth Crusade, establishment of the Latin Empire, Uniatism to note but a few) as well as practical matters such as the concrete exercise of the claim to papal primacy and how to ensure that ecclesiastical union would not mean mere absorption of the smaller Churches by the Latin component of the much larger Catholic Church (the most numerous single religious denomination in the world), and the stifling or abandonment of their own rich theological, liturgical and cultural heritage.

With respect to Catholic relations with Protestant communities, certain commissions were established to foster dialogue and documents have been produced aimed at identifying points of doctrinal unity, such as the Joint Declaration on the Doctrine of Justification produced with the Lutheran World Federation in 1999.

===== Ecumenism within Protestantism =====
Ecumenical movements within Protestantism have focused on determining a list of doctrines and practices essential to being Christian and thus extending to all groups which fulfil these basic criteria a (more or less) co-equal status, with perhaps one's own group still retaining a "first among equal" standing. This process involved a redefinition of the idea of "the Church" from traditional theology. This ecclesiology, known as denominationalism, contends that each group (which fulfils the essential criteria of "being Christian") is a sub-group of a greater "Christian Church", itself a purely abstract concept with no direct representation, i.e., no group, or "denomination", claims to be "the Church". Obviously, this ecclesiology is at variance with other groups that indeed consider themselves to be "the Church". The "essential criteria" generally consist of belief in the Trinity, belief that Jesus Christ is the only way to have forgiveness and eternal life, and that He died and rose again bodily.

=== Trends in western theology ===
==== Modernism and liberal Christianity ====
Liberal Christianity, sometimes called liberal theology, is an umbrella term covering diverse, philosophically-informed religious movements and moods within late 18th-, 19th- and 20th-century Christianity. The word "liberal" in liberal Christianity does not refer to a leftist political agenda or set of beliefs, but rather to the freedom of dialectic process associated with continental philosophy and other philosophical and religious paradigms developed during the Age of Enlightenment.

==== Fundamentalism ====
Fundamentalist Christianity, is a movement that arose mainly within British and American Protestantism in the late 19th and early 20th centuries in reaction to modernism and certain liberal Protestant groups that denied doctrines considered fundamental to Christianity yet still called themselves "Christian". Thus, fundamentalism sought to re-establish tenets that could not be denied without relinquishing a Christian identity, the "fundamentals": inerrancy of the Bible, Sola Scriptura, the Virgin Birth of Jesus, the doctrine of substitutionary atonement, the bodily Resurrection of Jesus, and the imminent return of Jesus Christ.

== Contemporary Christianity (1946 – present) ==
=== Second Vatican Council ===
On 11 October 1962 Pope John XXIII opened the Second Vatican Council, the 21st ecumenical council of the Catholic Church. The council was "pastoral" in nature, emphasising and clarifying already defined dogma, revising liturgical practices, and providing guidance for articulating traditional Church teachings in contemporary times. The council is perhaps best known for its instructions that the Mass may be celebrated in the vernacular as well as in Latin.

== See also ==
- History of Christian theology
- History of the Roman Catholic Church
- History of the Eastern Orthodox Church
- History of Protestantism
- Christianization
- Timeline of Christianity
- Roman Catholic Church
- Eastern Orthodox Church
- Protestantism
- Timeline of Christian missions

History of Christianity: Modern Christianity
Preceded by: The; Reformation / Modern; Christianity / Contemporary Christianity
BC	C1	C2	C3	C4	C5	C6	C7	C8	C9	C10
C11	C12	C13	C14	C15	C16	C17	C18	C19	C20	C21

== Resources ==
- González, Justo L. (1985). The Story of Christianity, Vol. 2: The Reformation to the Present Day. San Francisco: Harper. ISBN 0-06-063316-6.
- Hastings, Adrian (1999). A World History of Christianity. Grand Rapids: Wm. B. Eerdmans Publishing. ISBN 0-8028-4875-3.
- Latourette, Kenneth Scott (1975). A History of Christianity, Volume 2: 1500 to 1975 (paperback). San Francisco: Harper. ISBN 0-06-064953-4.
- Shelley, Bruce L. (1996). Church History in Plain Language (2nd ed.). Word Pub. ISBN 0-8499-3861-9.
