= Julien Garnier =

French Jesuit missionary

Julien Garnier (born at Connerré, France, 6 January 1643; d. in Quebec, 1730) was a French Jesuit missionary to Canada, who wrote the first known dictionaries of the Seneca language.

== Life ==
Garnier entered the Society of Jesus in 1660; after two years as a novice, he sailed for Canada in October 1662. There he taught grammar at the Jesuit college, while studying theology under Jérôme Lalemant and learning Indian languages in preparation for missionary work. In 1668, Garnier became the first Jesuit to be ordained in Canada.

He went first to the Oneida, but in a few months changed the field of his labours to the Onondaga mission. Garaconthié, the Onondaga chief, received him with every evidence of friendship, and, at his request, rebuilt the chapel of St. Mary.

On the arrival of other missionaries in 1671, Garnier set out with Father Jacques Frémin for the Seneca Nation country. There he found a bare handful of Christian Indians at the Gandachioragou mission. He immediately began to preach and baptize; and he persevered after his chapel was destroyed by a fire which wiped out the entire village. His missionary work saw significant success among the Senecas, for whom conversion offered valuable military and trading alliances, as well as access to medicine.

When trouble arose in 1683 between the French and the Senecas, Garnier went with de Lamberville to Governor de la Barre to urge compromise and moderation. He was unable, however, to dissuade the latter from his policy of repression. When de la Barre led troops against the Senecas, they summarily defeated him, leading de la Barre to return to France in disgrace. His replacement, de Denonville, betrayed the Seneca leaders under a flag of truce, before marching through their territory and burning their villages.

The missionaries were recalled at the outbreak of these hostilities, and were unable to return during the following twenty years of conflict. During that time, Garnier lived at the settlements of Sault-Saint-Louis, Lorette and Caughnawaga. In 1701, the treaty of Montreal allowed Garnier to return to his mission among the Senecas. There he remained until 1709, when Schuyler's expedition once more made it necessary for him to return to Canada. His departure marked the end of missionary work among the Senecas; his notes and letters remain one of the principal and most accurate sources of information on this division of the Iroquois.

In 1716, Garnier became superior of the missions in New France. He passed his remaining years among the various settlements along the St. Lawrence River, retiring from active life in 1728.
