= Christianity in the 18th century =

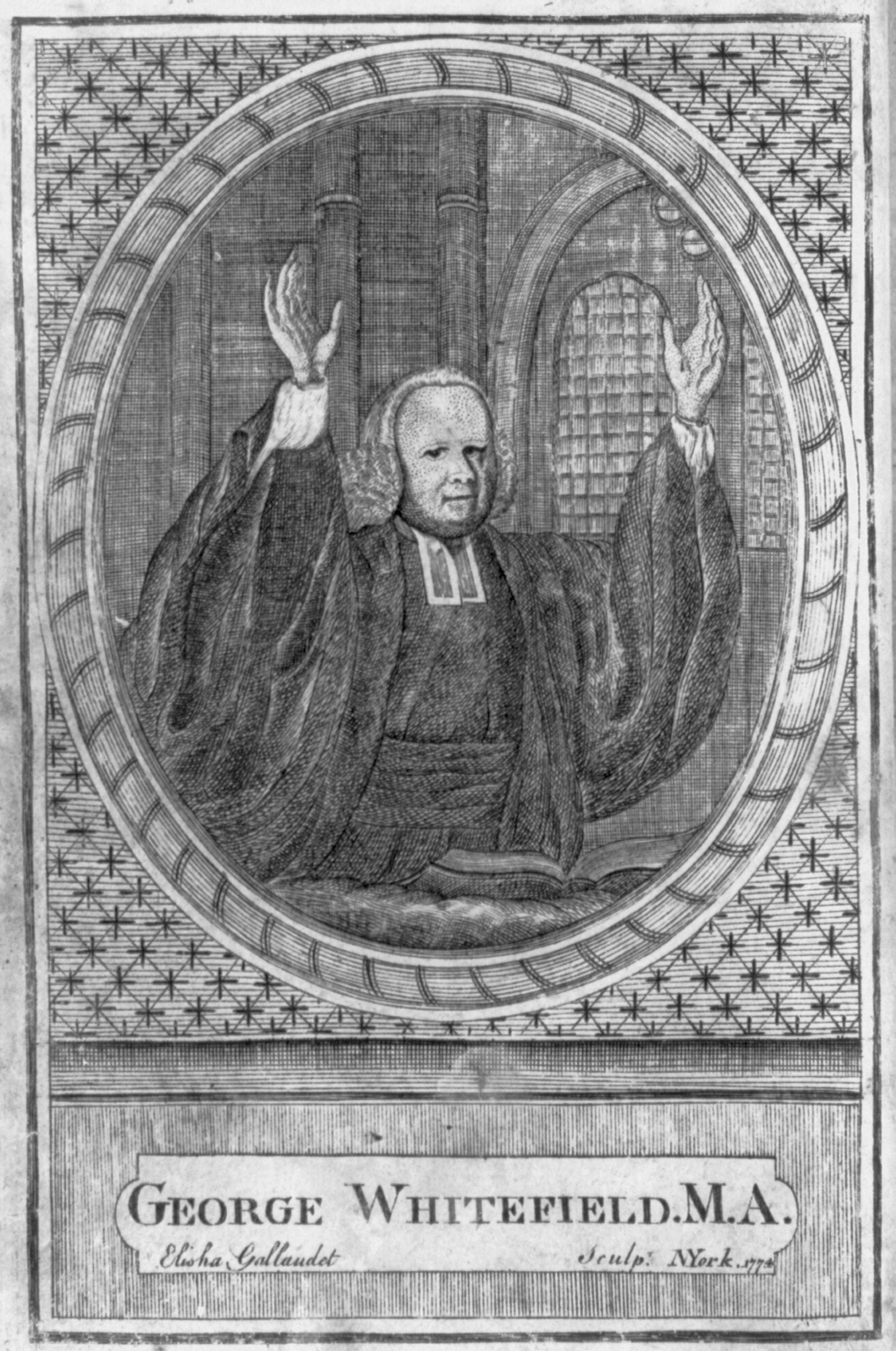
George Whitefield, leader in the First Great Awakening

Christianity in the 18th century is marked by the First Great Awakening in the Americas, along with the expansion of the Spanish and Portuguese empires around the world, which helped to spread Catholicism.

== Protestant Pietism, evangelicalism ==
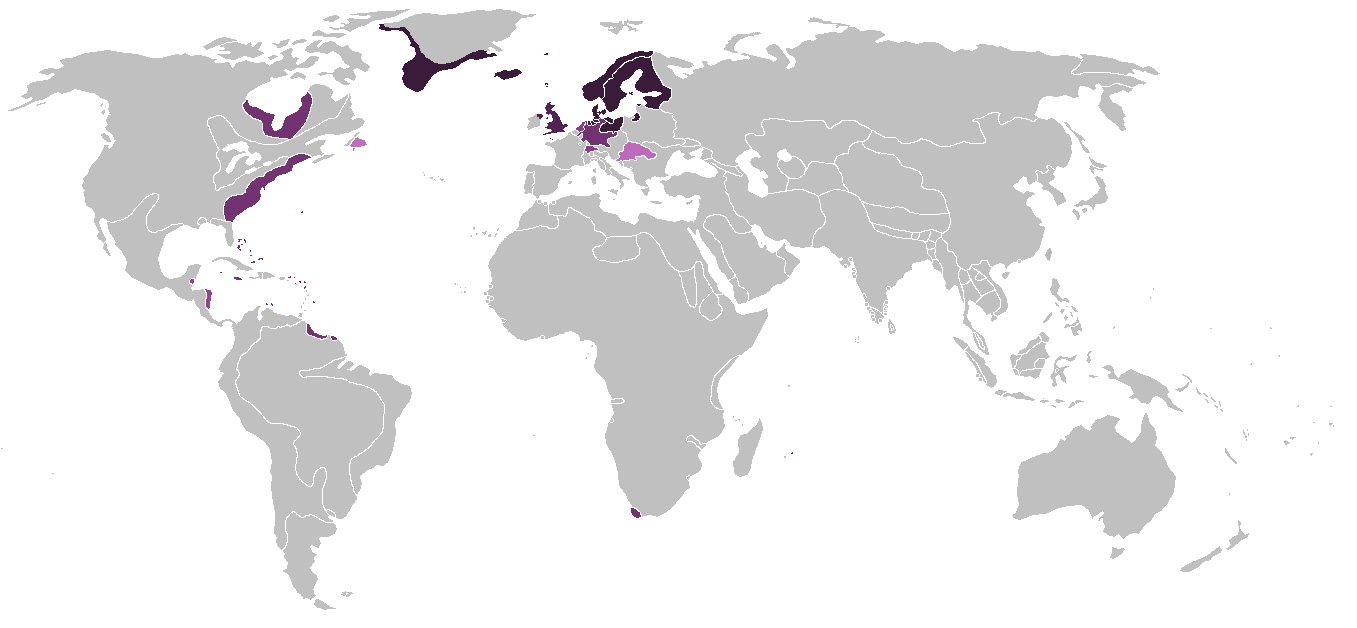
Global Protestantism, 1710

Historian Sydney E. Ahlstrom identified a "great international Protestant upheaval" that created Pietism in Germany and Scandinavia, the Evangelical Revival, and Methodism in England, and the First Great Awakening in the American colonies. This powerful grass-roots evangelical movement shifted the emphasis from formality to inner piety. In Germany it was partly a continuation of mysticism that had emerged in the Reformation era. The leader was Philipp Spener (1635–1705), They downplayed theological discourse and believed that all ministers should have a conversion experience; they wanted the laity to participate more actively in church affairs. Pietists emphasized the importance of Bible reading. August Hermann Francke (1663–1727) was another important leader who made the University of Halle the intellectual center. Pietism was strongest in the Lutheran churches, and also had a presence in the Dutch Reformed church. In Germany, however, reformed Reformed Church's work closely under the control of the government, which distrusted Pietism. Likewise in Sweden, the Lutheran Church of Sweden was so legalistic and intellectually oriented, that it brushed aside pietistic demands for change. Pietism continues to have its influence on European Protestantism, and extended its reach through missionary work across the world.

The same movement toward individual piety was called evangelicalism in Britain and its colonies. The most important leaders included Methodists John Wesley, George Whitefield and hymn writer Charles Wesley. Movements occurred inside the established state churches, but there was also a centripetal force that led to partial independence, as in the case of the Methodist and Wesleyan revivals.

=== The American Great Awakening ===
The First Great Awakening was a wave of religious enthusiasm among Protestants that swept the American colonies in the 1730s and 1740s, leaving a permanent impact on American religion. Jonathan Edwards, perhaps most powerful intellectual in colonial America, was a key leader. George Whitefield came over from England and made many converts. The Great Awakening emphasized the traditional Reformed virtues of Godly preaching, rudimentary liturgy, and a deep sense of personal guilt and redemption by Christ Jesus. It resulted from powerful preaching that deeply affected listeners with a deep sense of personal guilt and salvation by Christ. Pulling away from ritual and ceremony, the Great Awakening made religion personal to the average person.

It had a major impact in reshaping the Congregational, Presbyterian, Dutch Reformed, and German Reformed denominations, and it strengthened the small Baptist and Methodist denominations. It brought Christianity to the slaves and was an apocalyptic event in New England that challenged established authority. It incited rancor and division between the new revivalists and the old traditionalists who insisted on ritual and doctrine. It had little impact on Anglicans and Quakers.

Unlike the Second Great Awakening that began about 1800 and which reached out to the unchurched, the First Great Awakening focused on people who were already church members. It changed their rituals, their piety, and their self-awareness. The new style of sermons and the way people practiced their faith breathed new life into religion in America. People became passionately and emotionally involved in their religion, rather than passively listening to intellectual discourse in a detached manner. Ministers who used this new style of preaching were generally called "new lights", while the preachers of old were called "old lights". People began to study the Bible at home, which effectively decentralized the means of informing the public on religious manners and was akin to the individualistic trends present in Europe during the Protestant Reformation.

== Catholicism ==
=== Europe ===
Across Europe the Catholic Church was in a weak position. In the major countries, it was largely controlled by the government. The Jesuits were dissolved in Europe. Intellectually, the Enlightenment attacked and ridiculed the Catholic Church, and the aristocracy was given very little support. In the Austrian Empire, the population was a heavily Catholic one, but the government seized control of all the Church lands. The peasant classes continue to be devout, but they had no voice. The French Revolution of the 1790s had a devastating impact in France, essentially shutting down the Catholic Church, seizing and selling its properties, closing its monasteries and schools and exiling most of its leaders.

==== Jesuits ====
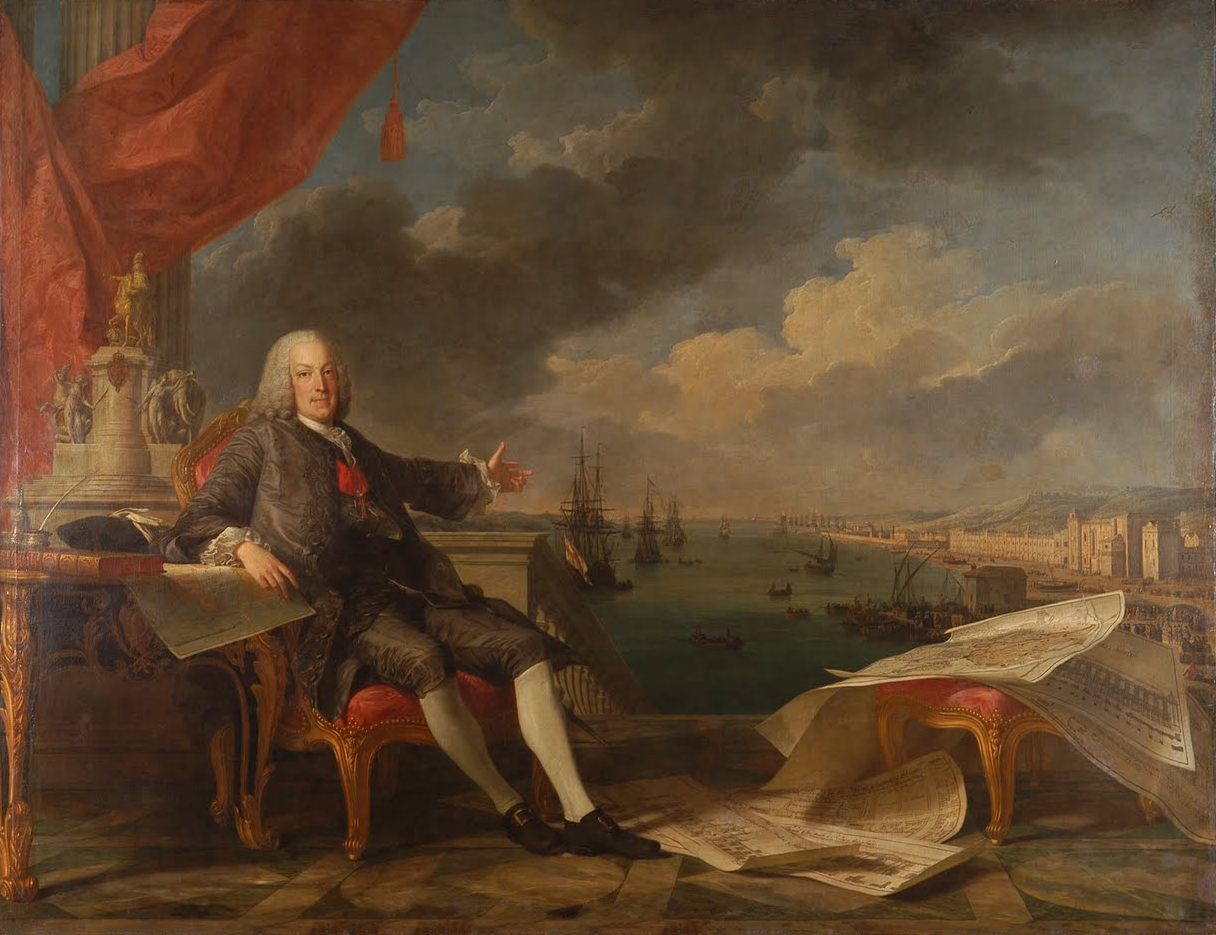
Sebastião José de Carvalho e Melo, Marquis of Pombal, "The Expulsion of the Jesuits" by Louis-Michel van Loo, 1766.

Throughout the inculturation controversy, the very existence of Jesuits were under attack in Portugal, Spain, France, and the Kingdom of Sicily. The inculturation controversy and the Jesuit support for the native Indians in South America added fuel to growing criticism of the order, which seemed to symbolize the strength and independence of the Church. Defending the rights of native peoples in South America, hindered the efforts of European powers, especially Spain and Portugal to maintain absolute rule over their domains. Portugal's Sebastião José de Carvalho e Melo, Marquis of Pombal was the main enemy of the Jesuits. Pope Clement XIII attempted to keep the Jesuits in existence without any changes: Sint ut sunt aut not sint ("Leave them as they are or not at all.") In 1773, European rulers united to force Pope Clement XIV to dissolve the order officially, although some chapters continued to operate. Pius VII restored the Jesuits in the 1814 papal bull Sollicitudo omnium ecclesiarum.

=== French Revolution ===
Matters grew still worse with the violent anti-clericalism of the French Revolution. Direct attacks on the wealth of the Catholic Church and associated grievances led to the wholesale nationalisation of church property and attempts to establish a state-run church. Large numbers of priests refused to take an oath of compliance to the National Assembly, leading to the Catholic Church being outlawed and replaced by a new religion of the worship of "Reason" along with a new French Republican Calendar. In this period, all monasteries were destroyed, 30,000 priests were exiled and hundreds more were killed.

When Pope Pius VI sided against the revolution in the First Coalition, Napoleon Bonaparte invaded Italy. The 82-year-old pope was taken prisoner to France in February 1799 and died in Valence August 29, 1799 after six months of captivity. To win popular support for his rule, Napoleon re-established the Catholic Church in France through the Concordat of 1801. All over Europe, the end of the Napoleonic Wars signaled by the Congress of Vienna, brought Catholic revival, and renewed enthusiasm and respect for the papacy following the depredations of the previous era.

=== Spanish colonies ===
The expansion of the Roman Catholic Portuguese Empire and Spanish Empire with a significant role played by the Roman Catholic Church led to the Christianization of the indigenous peoples of the Americas such as the Aztecs and Incas.

In the Americas, the Roman Catholic Church expanded its missions but, until the 19th century, had to work under the Spain and Portuguese governments and military. Junípero Serra, the Franciscan priest in charge of this effort, founded a series of missions which became important economic, political, and religious institutions.

=== China ===
The bull of Pope Benedict XIV Ex Quo Singulari from July 11, 1742, repeated verbatim the bull of Clement XI and stressed the purity of Christian teachings and traditions, which must be upheld against all heresies. Chinese missionaries were forbidden to take part in honors paid to ancestors, to Confucius, or to the emperors. This bull virtually destroyed the Jesuit goal to Christianize the influential upper classes in China. The Vatican policy was the death of the missions in China. Afterwards the Roman Catholic Church experienced missionary setbacks, and in 1721 the Chinese Rites controversy led the Kangxi Emperor to outlaw Christian missions. The Chinese emperor felt duped and refused to permit any alteration of the existing Christian practices. He told the visiting papal delegate: "You destroyed your religion. You put in misery all Europeans living here in China."

A similar policy of persecution against Christians broke in the Siamese Kingdom after the 1731 Edict of Ayutthaya on Missionary Activities.

=== Korea ===
In contrast to most other nation, Catholicism was introduced into Korea in 1784 by Koreans themselves without assistance of foreign missionaries. Some Silhak scholars devoted themselves to an intensive study of various philosophical and scientific texts written by Chinese and European scholars. Among those texts were Catholic theological books published in China by Jesuits. They believed Catholicism complements what was lacking in Confucianism. These noble intellectuals became the first Christians in Korea. Yi Seung-hun, the first Korean who was christened Peter in Beijing, on his return from China in September 1784, and formed a Christian community. The Christian community developed rapidly thanks to their ardent dedication to the mission. They translated books on Catholicism from Chinese into Korean for Koreans and constantly appealed to the Holy See to send priests for Korean people. As a result, Pope Leo XII established the Korea Apostolic Vicariate and to delegate the missionary work to the Paris Foreign Missions Society in 1828. Since then French missionaries came to Korea secretly. In 1846, Andrew Kim Taegon was ordained and became the first Korean priest.

== Eastern Orthodoxy ==
=== Serbian Church ===
During the Austro-Turkish war (1683–1699) years, relations between Muslims and Christians in European provinces of the Turkish Empire were greatly radicalized. As a result of Turkish oppression, destruction of monasteries and violence against the non-Muslim civilian population, Serbian Christians and their Church leaders headed by Serbian Patriarch Arsenije III sided with Austrians in 1689 and again in 1737 under Serbian Patriarch Arsenije IV. In the following punitive campaigns, Turkish armies conducted many atrocities against local Christian populations in Serbian regions, resulting in Great Migrations of the Serbs.

Consequent Serbian uprisings against the Turks and involvement of Serbian Patriarchs in anti-Ottoman activities, led to the political compromise of the Patriarchate in the eyes of the Turkish political elite. Instead of Serbian bishops, Turkish authorities favored politically more reliable Greek bishops who were promoted to Serbian eparchies and even to the Patriarchal throne in Peć. In the same time, after 1752 a series of internal conflicts arose among leading figures in the Serbian Patriarchate, resulting in constant fights between Serbian and Greek pretenders to the Patriarchal throne. Finally, the Serbian Patriarchate of Peć collapsed in 1766, when it was abolished by the Turkish Sultan Mustafa III (1757–1774). The entire territory of the Serbian Patriarchate under Ottoman rule was placed under the jurisdiction of the Ecumenical Patriarchate of Constantinople. The throne of Peć was suppressed and eleven remaining Serbian eparchies were transferred to the throne of Constantinople.

=== Russian Church ===
In 1721, Tsar Peter I abolished completely the patriarchate and so the Russian Orthodox Church effectively became a department of the government, ruled by a Most Holy Synod composed of senior bishops and lay bureaucrats appointed by the Tsar.

== Timeline ==
18th century Timeline

- 1701 - Society for the Propagation of the Gospel in Foreign Parts officially organized
- 1701 - Old Catholic Church of the Netherlands splits with Roman Catholicism
- 1702 - George Keith, returns to America as a missionary of the newly organized Society for the Propagation of the Gospel in Foreign Parts
- 1703 - The Society for the Propagation of the Gospel in Foreign Parts expands to the West Indies
- 1704 - French missionary priests arrive to evangelize the Chitimacha living along the Mississippi River in what is now the state of Louisiana
- 1705 - Danish-Halle Mission to India begins with Bartholomew Ziegenbalg and Henry Plutschau
- 1706 - Irish-born Francis Makemie, who has been an itinerant Presbyterian missionary among the colonists of America since 1683, is finally able to organize the first American presbytery
- 1707 - Italian Capuchin missionaries reach Kathmandu in Nepal. Maillard de Tournon makes public, in Nanjing, the Vatican decisions on rites, including the stipulations against the veneration of ancestors and of Confucius.
- 1707 - Examen theologicum acroamaticum by David Hollatz: the last great work of the Lutheran doctrine before the Age of Enlightenment
- 1708 - Jesuit missionary Giovanni Battista Sidotti is arrested in Japan. He is taken to Edo (now called Tokyo) to be interrogated by Arai Hakuseki
- 1709 - Experience Mayhew, missionary to the Martha's Vineyard Indians, translates the Psalms and the Gospel of John into the Massachusett language. It will be a work considered second only to John Eliot's Indian Bible in terms of significant Indian-language translations in colonial New England
- 1710 - First modern Bible Society founded in Germany by Count Canstein
- 1711 - Jesuit Eusebio Kino, missionary explorer in southern Arizona and northern Sonora, dies suddenly in northern Mexico. Kino, who has been called "the cowboy missionary", had fought against the exploitation of Indians in Mexican silver mines.
- 1712 - Using a press sent by The Society for Promoting Christian Knowledge, the Tranquebar Mission in India begins printing books in the Portuguese language
- 1713 - Jesuit Ippolito Desideri goes to Tibet as a missionary
- 1714 - New Testament translated into Tamil (India); a missionary training college is established in Copenhagen
- 1715 - Eastern Orthodox Church missionary outreach is renewed in Manchuria and Northern China
- 1716 - The establishment of the Alamo Mission in San Antonio is authorized by the viceroy of Mexico. The mission was to be an educational center for Native Americans who converted to Christianity.
- 1717 - Chen Mao writes to the Chinese Emperor about his concerns over Catholic missionaries and Western traders. He urgently requested an all-out prohibition of Catholic missionaries in the Qing provinces.
- 1718 - Bartholomäus Ziegenbalg constructs a church building in India that is still in use today
- 1718-22 - orthodox Lutheran Valentin Ernst Löscher publishes The Complete Timotheus Verinus against Pietism
- 1719 - Isaac Watts writes missionary hymn "Jesus Shall Reign Where'er the Sun"
- 1720 - Missionary Johann Ernst Gruendler dies in India. He had arrived there in 1709 with the sponsorship of the Danish Mission Society
- 1721 - Mission San Juan Bautista Malibat in Baja California is abandoned due to the hostility of the Cochimi Indians, as well as to the decimation of the local population by epidemics and a water shortage. Chinese Kangxi Emperor bans Christian missionaries as a result of the Chinese Rites controversy.
- 1721 - Peter the Great substituted Moscow Patriarchate with the Holy Synod
- 1722 - Hans Egede goes to Greenland
- 1723 - Robert Millar publishes A History of the Propagation of Christianity and the Overthrow of Paganism advocating prayer as the primary means of converting non-Christians
- 1724 - Yongzheng Emperor bans missionary activities outside the Beijing area
- 1725 - Knud Leem arrives as a missionary to the Sami people of Finnmark (Norwegian Arctic)
- 1726 - John Wright, a Quaker missionary to the Native Americans, settles in southeastern Pennsylvania
- 1728 - Institutum Judaicum founded in Halle as first Protestant mission center for Jewish evangelism
- 1728 - The Vicar of Bray (song)
- 1729 - Roman Catholic missionary Du Poisson becomes the first victim in the Natchez massacre. On his way to New Orleans, he had been asked to stop and say Mass at the Natchez post. He was killed in front of the altar
- 1730 - Lombard, French missionary, founds a Christian village with over 600 Indians at the mouth of Kuru river in French Guiana. A Jesuit, Lombard has been called the most successful of all missionaries in converting the Indians of French Guiana
- 1730-1749 - First Great Awakening in U.S.
- 1731 - A missionary movement is born when Count Nicolaus Ludwig Zinzendorf attends the coronation of King Christian VI of Denmark. By the following year, the movement with which Zinzendorf was associated, the Moravian Church, would launch missionary outreach in the Caribbean.
- 1732 - Alphonsus Liguori founds the Roman Catholic religious order known as the Redemptorist Fathers with the purpose of doing missionary work among rural people
- 1733 - Moravians go to Greenland
- 1734 - A missionary convinces a Groton, Connecticut church to lend its building to the Mashantucket Pequot Tribe for Christian worship services.
- 1735 - John Wesley goes to Indians in Georgia as missionary with the Society for the Propagation of the Gospel in Foreign Parts
- 1735 - Welsh Methodist revival
- 1736 - Anti-Christian edicts in China; Moravian missionaries at work among Nenets people of Arkhangelsk
- 1737 - Rev. Pugh, a missionary in Pennsylvania with The Society for the Propagation of the Gospel in Foreign Parts, writes home to London to say that he had begun ministering to blacks. He noted that the masters of the slaves were prejudiced against them becoming Christian.
- 1738 - Moravian missionary George Schmidt settles in Baviaan Kloof (Kloof of the Baboons) in the Riviersonderend valley of South Africa. He begins working with the Khoikhoi people, who were practically on the threshold of extinction.
- 1738 - Methodist movement, led by John Wesley and his hymn-writing brother Charles, begins
- 1739 - The first missionary to the Mahican (Mohegan) Indians, John Sergeant, builds a home in Stockbridge, Massachusetts that is today a museum.
- 1740 - Moravian David Zeisberger starts work among Creek people of Georgia
- 1741 - Dutch missionaries start building Christ Church building in Malacca Town, Malaysia. It will take 12 years to complete.
- 1741 - Sinners in the Hands of an Angry God, famous Fire and brimstone sermon
- 1742 - Moravian Leader Count Zinzendorf visits Shekomeko, New York and baptizes six Indians
- 1743 - David Brainerd starts ministry to North American Indians
- 1744 - Thomas Thompson resigns his position as dean at the University of Cambridge to become a missionary. He was sent by the Society for the Propagation of the Gospel in Foreign Parts to New Jersey. Taking a special interest in the slave population there, he would later request to begin mission work in Africa. In 1751, Thompson would become the first S.P.G. missionary to the Gold Coast (modern-day Ghana)
- 1745 - David Brainerd, after preaching to Native Americans in December, wrote about the response: "They soon came in, one after another; with tears in their eyes, to know, what they should do to be saved. . . . It was an amazing season of power among them, and seemed as if God had bowed the heavens and come down ... and that God was about to convert the whole world."
- 1746 - From Boston, Massachusetts a call is issued to the Christians of the New World to enter into a seven-year "Concert of Prayer" for missionary work
- 1747 - Jonathan Edwards appeals for prayer for world missions; birth of Thomas Coke, the "Father of Methodist Missions"
- 1748 - Roman Catholic Pedro Sanz and the four other missionaries are executed, together with 14 Chinese Christians. Prior to his death, Sanz reportedly converted some of his prison guards to Christianity.
- 1749 - Spanish Franciscan priest Junipero Serra (1713–1784) arrives in Mexico as a missionary. In 1767 he would go north to what is now California, zealously converting Native Americans.
- 1750 - Jonathan Edwards, preacher of the First Great Awakening, having been banished from his church at Northampton, Massachusetts goes as a missionary to the nearby Housatonic Indians. Christian Frederic Schwartz goes to India with Danish-Halle Mission
- 1751 - Samuel Cooke arrives in New Jersey as a missionary for the Society for the Propagation of the Gospel in Foreign Parts
- 1752 - Thomas Thompson, first Anglican missionary to Africa, arrives in the Gold Coast (now Ghana)
- 1753 - Searchers in Labrador looking for Moravian Johann Christian Erhardt finds the body of one of his traveling companions. The disappearance of Erhardt and six companions had led to temporary abandonment of Moravian missionary initiatives in Labrador.
- 1754 - Moravian John Ettwein arrives in America from Germany as a missionary. Preaching to Native Americans and establishing missions, Ettwein will travel as far south as Georgia. Eventually, he will become head of the Moravian Church in what is now the United States.
- 1755 - The Mahican Indian settlement at Gnadenhutten, Pa. is attacked and destroyed. Moravian missionary Johann Jacob Schmick who pastors a group of Indian converts, will remain with the Mahicans through exile and captivity despite almost constant threats from white neighbors. Schmick will join his Indian congregation as they seek refuge in Bethlehem, follow them as captives to Philadelphia, and remain with them after they settle in Wyalusing, Pennsylvania.
- 1756 - Civil unrest forces Gideon Halley away from his missionary work among the Six Nations on the Susquehanna River where he has been working for four years under the supervision of Jonathan Edwards with an appointment from the Society for Propagating the Gospel among the Indians.
- 1757 - Lutherans begin ministering to Blacks in the Caribbean
- 1758 - John Wesley baptizes two African-American slaves, thus breaking the skin color barrier for Methodist societies
- 1759 - Native American Samson Occom, direct descendant of the great Mahican chief Uncas, is ordained by the Presbyterians. Despite poor eyesight, Occom became the first American Indian to publish works in English. These included sermons, hymns and a short autobiography.
- 1760 - Adam Voelker and Christian Butler arrive in Tranquebar as the first Moravian missionaries to India
- 1761 - The first Moravian missionary in Ohio, Frederick Post, settles on the north side of the Muskingum in what is now Bethlehem township
- 1762 - Moravian Missionary John Heckewelder confers with Koquethagacton ("White Eyes") at the mouth of the Beaver River (Pennsylvania)
- 1763 - The Presbyterian Synod of New York orders that a collection for missions be taken. In 1767 the Synod will ask that this collection be done annually.
- 1764 - The Moravians make a decision to expand and begin publicizing their missionary activity, particularly in the British colonies; Moravian Jens Haven makes the first of three exploratory missionary journeys to Greenland
- 1765 - Suriname Governor General Crommelin convinces three Moravian missionaries to work near the head waters of the Gran Rio. They settle among the Saramaka near the Senthea Creek in Granman Abini's village where they are received with mixed feelings.
- 1766 - Philip Quaque, a Fetu youth from the Cape Coast area of Ghana who spent twelve years studying in England, returns to Africa. Supported as a missionary by the Society for the Propagation of the Gospel in Foreign Parts, Quaque is first non-European ordained priest in the Church of England
- 1767 - Spain expels the Jesuits from Spanish colonies in the New World
- 1767-1815 - Suppression of the Jesuits
- 1768 - Five United Brethren missionaries from Germany, invited by the Danish Guinea Company, arrive in the Gold Coast (now Ghana), to teach in the Cape Coast Castle schools
- 1768 - Reimarus dies without publishing his radical critic work distinguishing Historical Jesus versus Christ of Faith
- 1768 New Smyrna, Florida, Greek Orthodox colony founded
- 1769 - Junípero Serra founds Mission San Diego de Alcalá, first of the 21 Alta California missions
- 1769 - Mission San Diego de Alcala, first California mission
- 1770 - John Marrant, a free black from New York City, begins ministering cross-culturally, preaching to the American Indians. By 1775 he had carried the gospel to the Cherokee and Creek Indians as well as to groups he called the Catawar and Housaw peoples.
- 1771 - Francis Asbury arrives in America; David Avery is ordained as missionary to the Oneida tribe
- 1771 - Emanuel Swedenborg, published his "Universal Theology of the True Christian Religion" which would later be used by others to found Swedenborgianism
- 1772 - After visiting Scilly Cove in Newfoundland, Canada, missionary James Balfour describes it as a "most Barbarous Lawless Place"
- 1773 - Pope Clement XIV dissolves the Jesuit Order; two Dominican order missionaries beheaded in Vietnam
- 1774 - Moravian missionaries Christoph Brasen and Gottfried Lehmann drown when their sloop sinks in a storm off Greenland
- 1774 - Ann Lee leader of American Shakers
- 1774 - Gotthold Ephraim Lessing starts publishing Reimarus works on historical Jesus as Anonymous Fragments, starting Liberal Theology Era (in Christology)
- 1775 - John Crook is sent by Liverpool Methodists to the Isle of Man
- 1776 - Cyril Vasilyevich Suchanov builds first church among Evenks of Transbaikal (or Dauria) in (Siberia); The first baptism of an Eskimo by a Lutheran pastor takes place in Labrador.
- 1776 - Mission Dolores, San Francisco
- 1776-1788 Gibbon's The History of the Decline and Fall of the Roman Empire, critical of Christianity
- 1777 - Portuguese missionaries build a church at Hashnabad, Bangladesh
- 1778 - Theodore Sladich is martyred while doing missionary work to counter Islamic influence in the western Balkans
- 1779 - Charles Simeon is converted while a student at King's College, Cambridge. Twenty years later he helped found what became the Church Missionary Society.
- 1779 - Virginia Statute for Religious Freedom, "Jesus never coerced anyone to follow him, and the imposition of a religion by government officials is impious"
- 1780 - August Gottlieb Spangenberg writes An Account of the Manner in Which the Protestant Church of the Unitas Fratrum, or United Brethren, Preach the Gospel, and Carry On Their Missions Among the Heathen. Originally written in the German language, the book will be translated into English in 1788.
- 1780 - Robert Raikes begins Sunday schools to reach poor and uneducated children in England
- 1781 - In the midst of the American Revolutionary War, the British so feared Moravian missionary David Zeisberger and his influence among the Lenape (also called Delaware) and other Native Americans that they arrested him and his assistant, John Heckewelder, charging them with treason,
- 1782 - Freed slave George Lisle goes to Jamaica as missionary
- 1783 - Moses Baker and George Gibbions, both former slaves, leave the U.S. to become missionaries in the West Indies
- 1784 - Thomas Coke (Methodist) submits his Plan for the Society for the Establishment of Missions Among the Heathen. Methodist missions among the "heathen" will begin in 1786 when Coke, destined for Nova Scotia, is driven off course by a storm and lands at Antigua in the British West Indies.
- 1784 - American Methodists form Methodist Episcopal Church at so-called "Christmas Conference", led by bishops Thomas Coke and Francis Asbury
- 1784 - Roman Catholicism is re-introduced in Korea and disseminates after almost 200 years since its first introduction in 1593.
- 1785 - Joseph White's sermon titled "On the Duty of Attempting the Propagation of the Gospel among our Mahometan and Gentoo Subjects in India" is published in the second edition of his book Sermons Containing a View of Christianity and Mahometanism, in their History, their Evidence, and their Effects. The sermon was first preached at the University of Oxford.
- 1786 - John Marrant, a free black from New York City, writes in his journal that he preached to "a great number of Indians and white people" at Green's Harbor, Newfoundland. Marrant's cross-cultural ministry led him to take the Gospel to the Cherokee, Creek, Catawba (he called them the Catawar, and Housaw Indians.
- 1787 - William Carey is ordained in England by the Particular Baptists and soon begins to urge that worldwide missions be undertaken.
- 1788 - Dutch missionaries begin preaching the Gospel among fishermen in Bangladesh
- 1788 - Richard Johnson accompanies First Fleet as first Christian minister in Australia.
- 1789 - The Jesuits establish Georgetown University as the first US Catholic college
- 1789-1801 - Dechristianisation of France during the French Revolution
- 1789-1815 - John Carroll, Roman Catholic Archdiocese of Baltimore, first Roman Catholic US bishop
- 1790 - Prince Williams, a freed slave from South Carolina, goes to Nassau, Bahamas, where he will start Bethel Meeting House
- 1791 - One hundred and twenty Korean Christians are tortured and killed for their faith. It began when Paul Yun Ji-Chung, a noble who had become a Christian, decided not to bury his mother according to traditional Confucian custom.
- 1791 - First Amendment to the United States Constitution
- 1792 - William Carey writes An Enquiry into the Obligations of Christians to use means for the conversion of the heathen and forms the Baptist Missionary Society to support him in establishing missionary work in India
- 1792 - William Carey writes An Enquiry into the Obligations of Christians to use means for the conversion of the heathen and forms the Baptist Missionary Society to support him in establishing missionary work in India
- 1793 - Stephen Badin ordained in U.S. Although much of Badin's ministry was pastoral work among his own countrymen, he did some outreach among the Potawatomi Indians
- 1793 Herman of Alaska brings Orthodoxy to Alaska
- 1794 - Eight Russian Orthodox missionaries arrive on Kodiak Island in Alaska. Within a few months several thousand people have been baptized
- 1795 - The London Missionary Society is formed to send missionaries to Tahiti
- 1795 - The Age of Reason written by Thomas Paine, advocated Deism
- 1796 - Scottish and Glasgow Missionary Societies established; In India, Johann Philipp Fabricius' translation of the Bible into Tamil is revised and published
- 1796 - Treaty with Tripoli (1796), article 11: "the Government of the United States of America is not, in any sense, founded on the Christian religion"
- 1797 - Netherlands Missionary Society formed; The Duff, carrying 36 lay and pastoral missionaries, sails to three islands of the South Pacific; The first Christian missionary (from the London Missionary Society) visits Hiva on the Pacific island of Tahuata; he is not well received.
- 1798 - The Missionary Society of Connecticut is organized by the Congregationalists to take the gospel to the "heathen lands" of Vermont and Ohio. Its missionaries evangelized both European settlers and Native Americans.
- 1799 - The Church Missionary Society (Church of England) is formed; John Vanderkemp, Dutch physician goes to Cape Colony, Africa
- 1800 - New York Missionary Society formed; Johann Janicke founds a school in Berlin to train young people for missionary service
- 1800 - Friedrich Schleiermacher publishes his first book, beginning Liberal Christianity movement
- 1800 - James Dixon and two other Irish convicts the first Catholic priests in Australia.

== See also ==
- History of Christianity
- History of Protestantism
- History of the Roman Catholic Church#Baroque, Enlightenment and revolutions
- History of Christianity of the Late Modern era
- History of the Eastern Orthodox Church
- History of Christian theology#Revivalism (1720–1906)
- History of Oriental Orthodoxy
- Restoration Movement
- Timeline of the English Reformation
- Timeline of Christianity#18th century
- Timeline of Christian missions#1700 to 1799
- Timeline of the Roman Catholic Church#1600–1800
- Chronological list of saints and blesseds in the 18th century

History of Christianity: Modern Christianity
Preceded by: Christianity in the 17th century / 18th century / Followed by: Christianity in the 19th century
BC	C1	C2	C3	C4	C5	C6	C7	C8	C9	C10
C11	C12	C13	C14	C15	C16	C17	C18	C19	C20	C21
