= Thai Sa =

King of Ayutthaya from 1708 to 1733

Thai Sa ท้ายสระ
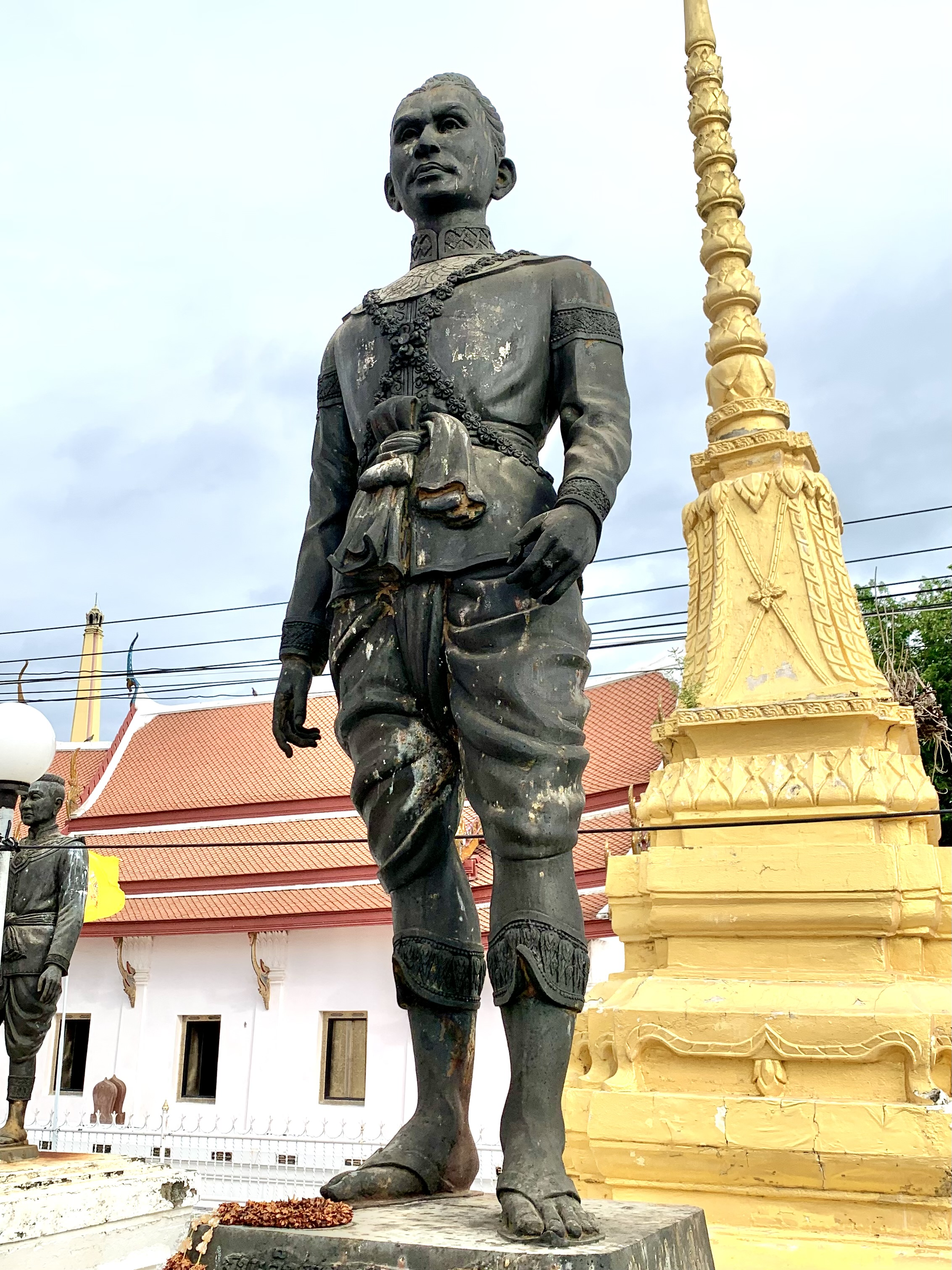
- Statue of King Thai Sa at Wat Pa Mok, Pa Mok district, Ang Thong province

King of Ayutthaya
- Reign: 1708 – 13 January 1733
- Predecessor: Sanphet VIII
- Successor: Borommakot
- Born: 1678
- Died: 13 January 1733 (aged 54–55); Ayutthaya, Ayutthaya Kingdom
- Spouse: Rachanurak, the Royal Consort
- Issue: 9 sons and daughters
- Dynasty: Ban Phlu Luang
- Father: Sanphet VIII
- Mother: Phanwasa

Prince Phet (Thai: เจ้าฟ้าเพชร, Thai pronunciation: [pʰet̚˦˥]), later known as King Thai Sa (Thai: พระเจ้าท้ายสระ, Thai pronunciation: [pʰra˦˥ t͡ɕaːw˥˩ tʰaːj˦˥ saʔ˨˩]) and formally styled as the King of Banyongrattanat Palace (Thai: สมเด็จพระที่นั่งบรรยงค์รัตนาสน์), was the King of the Ayutthaya Kingdom from 1709 to 1733 and the third ruler of the Ban Phlu Luang dynasty. The name "Thai Sa" (lit. "behind the pool") refers to the Banyongrattanat Palace, which was located by a pool where he often resided.

== History ==
King of Banyongrattanat Palace was born Prince Phet to King Sanphet VIII and his principal queen. After the death of his father in 1709 Prince Phet was crowned as King of Siam and took the reigning name Phumintharacha (Thai: ภูมินทราชา). He appointed his brother Prince Phon as the Prince Viceroy in First Class. The king was said to be so fond of silver barb that he forbade anyone but himself from fishing them or else they would be fined, and he liked to fish often in the pool beside Banyongrattanat Palace, where he came to live regularly. This earned him the epithet "Angler King" (Thai: ขุนหลวงทรงปลา). His reign was marked by the building of many canals, and "large sea-going vessels". Relations with Qing China also prospered during his reign, with Ayutthaya regularly dispatching tribute missions and exporting rice to southern China during periods of food shortage. Trade with Chinese merchants expanded significantly, contributing to the growing Chinese community in Ayutthaya. Siam also exported many live elephants.

=== Invasion of Cambodia ===
In the early reign of King Thai Sa, there was a royal succession conflict in Cambodia. Prince Ang Tong and his younger brother, Prince Kaev Hua III, were fighting for the throne of Cambodia. In 1715, Nguyễn Phúc Chu the Nguyen lord (Vietnam) who supported King Kaev Hua III invaded Oudong and King Thommo Reachea III and Prince Ang Tong along with their families fled to Ayutthaya for protection. King Tai Sa ordered Chao Phraya Chakri to invade Cambodia to restore King Thommarcha in 1717. The Siamese fleets suffered defeat by the Vietnamese at Banteay Mas yet on the land the Siamese were able to reach Oudong in 1718 and eliminated Vietnamese troops in the city. King Keao Fa, however, took negotiating measures. He agreed to pay tribute to the Siamese court as Ayutthaya's vassal state in exchange for the Siamese's acknowledgment of him as the legitimate king of Cambodia.

=== Succession crisis ===
King Thai Sa had three sons – Prince Narenthon, Prince Aphai and Prince Poramet. In 1732, while King Thai Sa was on his deathbed he gave the throne to Prince Aphai since Prince Narenthon, his elder brother had entered the priesthood. Prince Phon, the younger son of Sanphet VIII managed to defeat his nephews and took the throne as King Borommakot.

=== Death ===
As it appears in the archives of the French bishopric coming in Ayutthaya time by Adrien Louney that he has an abscess in his mouth or throat, while in the Autthaya Chronicle by Chat, Phra Chakkraphatphong it was recorded that he had a tongue disease. It therefore often assumed that he may have had the oral cancer, which may have been squamous cell carcinoma. He was suffering from this disease for a long time until his death on 13 January 1733. After that prince Aphai, the hereditary prince who claimed the throne, and prince Poremet fought a battle with Prince Phon, the prince Viceroy, the King's brother.

== Personality ==
The Royal Chronicles of Siam from the British Museum Manuscript states:

At that time, the King behaved in an immoral manner and went on excursions to fish with hooks, as his royal father had done. He especially enjoyed eating carp. Therefore, a royal decree was issued forbidding anyone from accepting carp as a royal gift. If any person consumed carp, that person was to be fined five taels.

King Thai Sa had a personality similar to that of King Suriyenthrathibodi. The chronicle describes him as follows:

The King delighted in killing living creatures. He killed many kinds of fish, both small and large, by angling, casting nets, and spearing them. He constructed fish traps and barriers, set traps and baskets, and engaged in various methods of slaughtering animals. He also traveled into the forests to hunt deer and birds for amusement, using snares and nooses, and organized elephant hunts and roundups, capturing many wild elephants over the course of several days before returning to the capital.

== Issue ==
#	Consort and Concubines	Children
1.	Thongsuk, Princess Rachanurak	Princess Thep; Princess Prathum; Narenthon, Prince Surenthra Phithak; Prince Aphai; Prince Poramet; Prince Thap
2.	Others	Prince Settha; Prince Prik; Princess Sombunkhong

== See also ==
- Edict of Ayutthaya on Missionary Activities

Thai Sa House of Ban Phlu Luang Born: 1678 Died: 13 January 1733
Regnal titles
Preceded by Suriyenthrathibodi	King of Ayutthaya; 1709–1733	Succeeded by Borommakot
Preceded by Suriyenthrathibodi	Viceroy of Ayutthaya; 1703–1709	Succeeded by Borommakot
