= Abraham Rogerius =

Dutch clergyman/translator

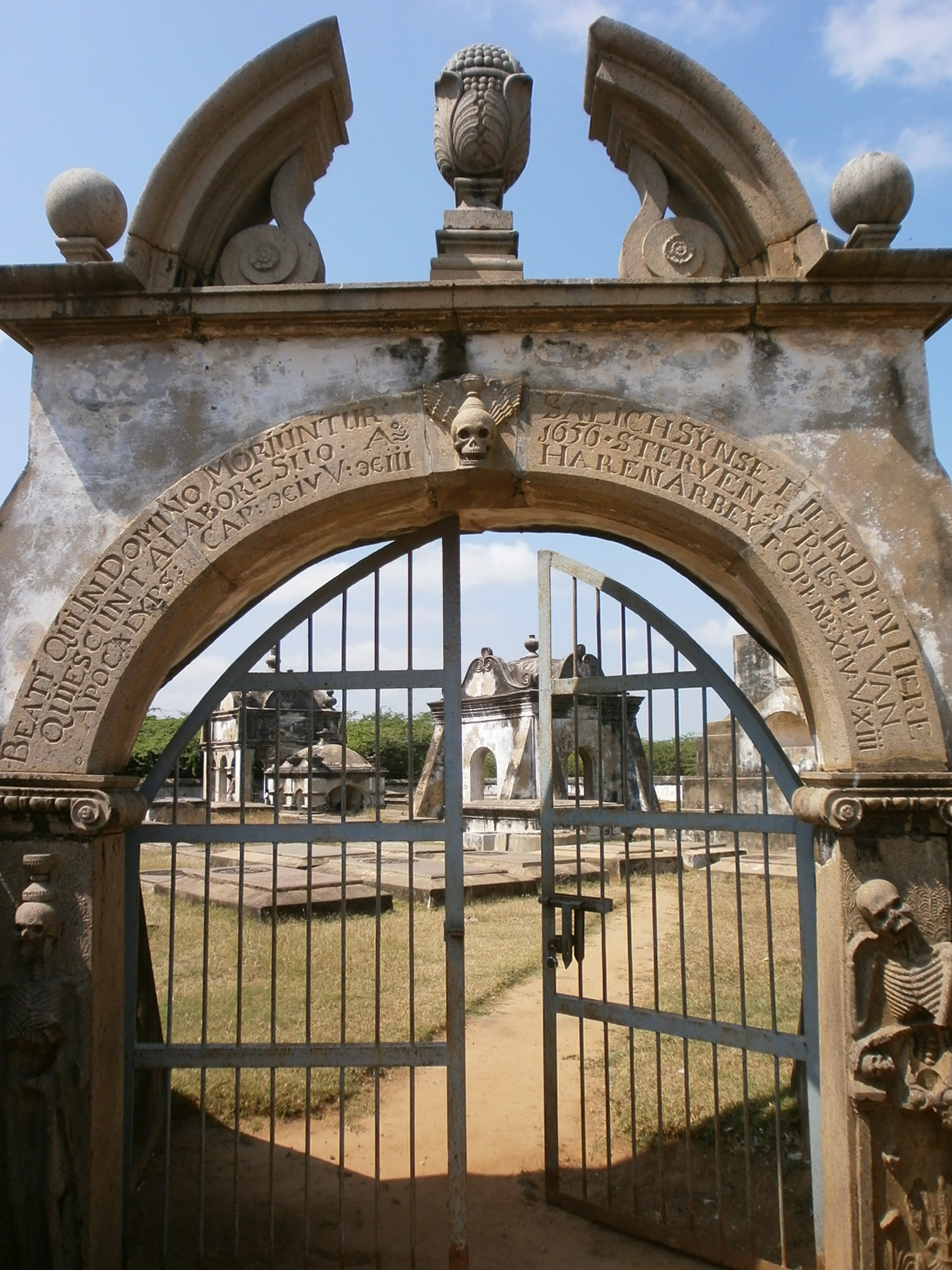
Entrance to the old (1656) Dutch Cemetery at Pulicat

Abraham Rogerius or Abraham Roger (1609 – 1649, in Gouda) was a Dutch clergyman/translator working for the Dutch East India Company, and one of the first Europeans who wrote about Indian culture.

== Life ==
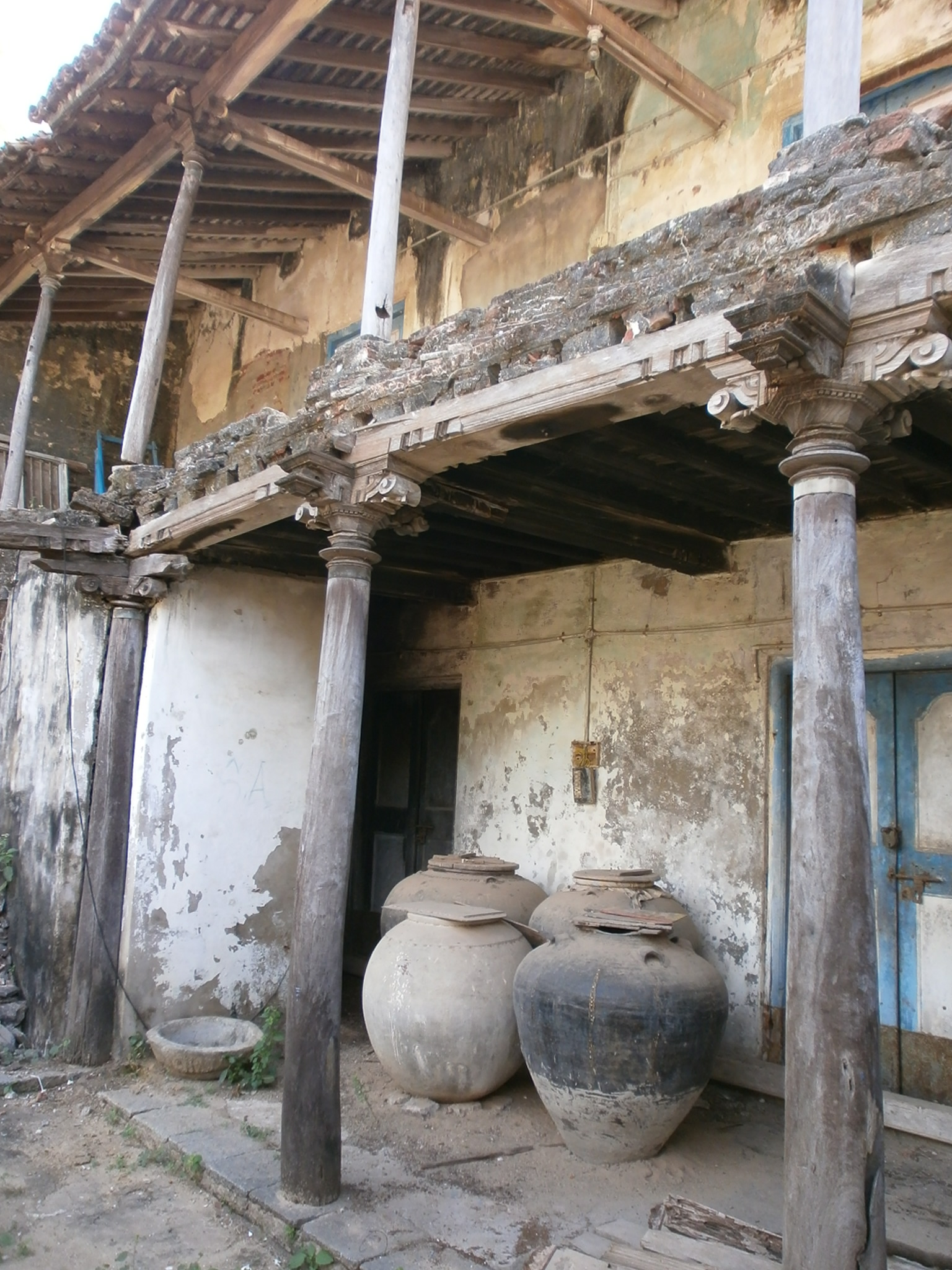
An old abandoned Dutch house in Pulicat

It is possible Abraham was born in Haarlem, like his brother Jacobus, also a chaplain, who went to the Indies. The Calvinist Rogerius (anglicized as Roger), studied in Leiden under Antonius Walaeus. His first trip was to Batavia (1631) and then Surat (1632). From 1633 he worked as a chaplain in Pulicat, the capital of Dutch Coromandel. He studied Hinduism in southern India and learned Portuguese. Rogerius authored Open Door to the Secrets of Heathendom, which begins with ten years of ministry among the Tamil people in the Dutch colony of Pulicat near Madras, India. His knowledge came from three Brahmins whom he met regularly. In 1642 he went back to Batavia and became the manager of an orphanage/school and promoted the use of Portuguese during church services. In 1647 he returned to the Dutch Republic.

"De Open-Deure tot het verborgen Heydendom ofte Waerachtigh vertoogh van het leven ende zeden, mitsgaders de Religie ende Gotsdienst der Bramines op de Cust Chormandel ende der landen daar ontrent ("The open door to the hidden paganism or truthful account of life and customs, as well as religion and worship of the Brahmins at Coromandel Coast and surrounding countries "), was published in Leiden in 1651 and since translated into German (1663), French (1670). This book was one of the first European books describing hinduism. The book has two parts. The first deals with the Brahmins life and customs, while the other describes their faith and worship. Rogerius seems to have been the first to publish a translation of aphorisms in Sanskrit by Bhartṛhari, (Hundred aphorisms on the path to heaven by the heathen Bhartṛhari, famous amongst the Brahmins on the Coromandel coast) which forms the third part of the book.

== Works ==
- Breviario de religiāo christāo, em maneira de dialogo (1689)
- De open-deure tot het verborgen heydendom

== Literature ==
- Biographies in Dutch
- Windisch, Ernst: Geschichte der Sanskrit Philologie und Indische Altertumskunde. Bd. 1. Strassburg, 1917.
