= Daniel Garacontié =

Onondaga chief

Daniel Garacontié (also Garacontie, Garakontie, Garakonthie, Garaconthie, Sagochiendagehté; died 1676) was a chief of the Onondaga nation. He was converted to Catholicism by Jesuit priests and was considered by the French to be a diplomat and peace-keeper for the Haudenosaunee (Iroquois). He was credited with obtaining the release of a number French prisoners from various Haudenosaunee nations.

After the flight of the French missionaries from Onondaga in 1658, Garakonthie, who, although not yet a Christian, had examined with care the customs of the French colonists, and the doctrines of the missionaries, became openly the protector of the Christians and an earnest advocate for peace. In 1661 he persuaded the Onondagas to send an embassy to Quebec, and to restore some of their captives as a preliminary to peace. Father Le Moyne accompanied the embassy on its return, and was received with great honor by Garakonthie, who converted his cabin into a chapel for the missionary. The chief then set out on an embassy to Montreal with nine of the French prisoners. He was well received, restored his captives, and obtained the liberation of several of his countrymen.

On his return he baffled the efforts of the chiefs who wished to make war on the French, frustrated a plot against Le Moyne's life, and prepared to conduct the missionary and the remaining captives to the St. Lawrence in 1662. During the war that followed the departure of Le Moyne, Garakonthie endeavored to procure the release of French captives, and protected the little body of Christians at Onondaga as far as his authority extended. In the spring of 1664 he succeeded in obtaining a decree of the council for another embassy, the object of which was to restore the French' prisoners and solicit peace; but the French, while expressing their gratitude for the efforts of Garakonthie, avoided making terms. In August, however, an agreement was made for an exchange of prisoners, and he set out with the French captives, but his party was attacked by the Algonquins, and, after severe loss, compelled to return.

Although always friendly to the French, and feeling the truth of Christianity, he did not show any desire to become a Christian until 1669. Then, at a conference with the French governor in Quebec, he declared his love for Christianity, and that he renounced “polygamy, the vanity of dreams, and every kind of sin.” He was baptized with great pomp in the cathedral of Quebec by Bishop Laval, the governor being his godfather, and Mlle. Bouteroue, the daughter of the intendant, his godmother. He received the name of Daniel at the font, and was then entertained with honor in the castle.

His conversion produced a great effect, not only at Onondaga, but in the other settlements. Some of the sachems endeavored to diminish his influence, declaring that he was no longer a man, and that the black robes had disordered his intellect; but when any embassy was to be sent, or an eloquent speaker was desired for any occasion, Garakonthie quickly recovered all his power. His influence was recognized even by the English governors of New York, who asked his mediation to effect a peace between the Mohawks and Mohegans. He was frequently engaged on embassies to New York State and Albany, as well as to Quebec and Montreal. He opposed the traditional beliefs and dances of the tribes, and did much to check them.

Garacontié died at Onondaga, in 1676. When he found his end approaching he gave his last counsels to his family, and ordering the funeral banquet to be prepared, he invited to it the chiefs of Onondaga, and sang his death song. Then he exhorted the sachems to become Christians and to banish liquor from the cantons. In order to induce his countrymen to follow his precepts, Garakonthie had adopted many European customs, and had learned to read and write, although advanced in years.
