= List of beatified people =

This is a list of beatified individuals or blesseds according to the Catholic Church. The list is in alphabetical order by Christian name but, if necessary, by surname, the place or attribute part of name as well.

Blessed	Date of death	Date of beatification
108 Martyrs of World War II	1939–1945	1999
Adílio Daronch	1924	2007
Adolph Kolping	1865	1991
Adrian Fortescue	1539	1895
Agatha Phutta	1940	1989
Agathange de Vendome	1638	
Agnellus of Pisa, OFM	1236	1882
Agnes Phila, LHC	1940	1989
Alain de Solminihac	1659	1981
Albertina Berkenbrock	1931	2007
Alberto da Bergamo, TOSD	1279	1748
Alberto Marvelli	1946	2004
Alexandrina Maria da Costa	1955	2004
Alfredo Ildefonso Schuster	1954	1996
Alix Le Clerc, CND	1622	1847
Alojs Andritzki	1943	2011
Aloysius Stepinac	1960	1998
Álvaro del Portillo	1994	2014
Álvaro of Córdoba, OP	1430	1741
Amadeus IX, Duke of Savoy	1472	1677
Ambrose of Siena (Sansedonius), OP	1286	1577
Ana de los Angeles Monteagudo	1686	1985
Anacleto González Flores	1927	2005
Ana Petra Pérez Florido	1906	1994
André Abellon, OP	1450	1902
André Grasset	1792	1926
Andrea Carlo Ferrari	1929	1987
Andrea Dotti	1315	1806
Andrew of Phú Yên	1644	2000
Angelina di Marsciano	1435	1825
Angelo Paoli	1720	2010
Anna Eugenia Picco	1921	2001
Anna Maria Taigi	1837	1920
Anne Catherine Emmerich	1824	2004
Anne of Saint Bartholomew	1626	1917
Anne-Marie Javouhey	1851	1950
Annunciata Astoria Cocchetti	1882	1991
Anton Maria Schwartz	1929	1998
Anton Martin Slomšek	1862	1999
Antoine Chevrier, TOR	1879	1986
Antoni Julian Nowowiejski	1941	1999
Antoni Ulma	1944	2023
Antonio Franco	1626	2013
Antonio Rosmini-Serbati	1855	2007
Anthony Baldinucci	1665	1893
Anthony Neyrot	1460	1767
Archangela Girlani	1494	1864
Ascensión Nicol Goñi	1940	2005
Assunta Marchetti	1948	2014
August Czartoryski	1893	2004
Augustine Fangi	1493	1878
Augustine Thevarparampil 'Kunjachan'	1973	2006
Baldassare Ravaschieri	1492	1930
Baptista Varani	1527	1843
Barbara Maix	1873	2010
Barbara Ulma	1944	2023
Bartolo Longo	1926	1980
Bartolomeo Cerveri, OP	1466	1853
Basil Moreau	1873	2007
Basil (Vasiľ) Hopko	1976	2003
Beatrice d'Este	1226	1763
Beatrix d'Ornacieux	1306	1869
Benigna Cardoso da Silva	1941	2022
Benôite (Benedicta) Rencurel	1647	1984
Bernard Mary of Jesus (Cesare Silvestrelli)	1911	1988
Bernardino of Fossa, OFM	1503	1828
Bernardo Francisco de Hoyos de Seña, SJ	1735	2010
Bernhard Lichtenberg	1943	1996
Bibiana Khampai	1940	1989
Bogumilus (Bogumił Piotr), OCamald	1204	1925
Boniface of Savoy	1270	1839
Bonifacia Rodríguez y Castro	1905	2003
Brocard	1231	
Bronislava of Poland	1259	1835
Bronisław Markiewicz SDB	1912	2005
Brother James Miller	1982	2019
Buzád Hahót	1241	
Caius of Korea	1624	1867
Candelaria of San José	1940	2008
Carlos Manuel Rodriguez	1963	2001
Cassien de Nantes	1638	1905
Caterina Dominici	1894	1978
Catherine of St. Augustine	1668	1989
Catherine Jarrige	1836	1996
Cecilia Butsi	1940	1989
Ceferino Namuncurá	1905	2007
Ceferino Giménez Malla	1936	1997
Celine Borzecka	1913	2007
Ceslaus	1242	1713
Charles I, Count of Flanders	1127	1884
Charles I of Austria and Hungary	1922	2004
Charles de Blois Châtillon	1319	1904
Chiara Badano	1990	2010
Christina von Stommeln	1312	1908
Christopher Robinson	1598	1987
Christopher Wharton	1600	1987
Ciriaco María Sancha y Hervás	1909	2009
Clara Fey	1894	2018
Clare of Rimini	1346	1782
Clemens August Graf von Galen	1946	2005
Clemente Marchisio	1903	1984
Colomba Gabriel	1926	1993
Columba of Rieti	1501	1625
Concepción Cabrera de Armida	1937	2019
Conrad of Offida	1306	1817
Contardo Ferrini	1902	1947
Crescencia Valls Espí	1936	2001
Cristobal of Saint Catherine	1690	2013
Cyprian Michael Iwene Tansi	1964	1998
Darío Acosta Zurita	1931	2005
Darwin Ramos	2012	TBA
Daudi Okelo	1918	2002
Diana degli Andalò, OP	1236	1888
Didacus Joseph of Cadiz	1801	1894
Diego Luis de San Vitores	1627	1985
Diego (Giuseppe) Oddi	1919	1999
Dina Belanger	1929	1993
Dom Justo Takayama	1615	2017
Domingo Iturrate Zubero (Domingo of the Blessed Sacrament), OSsT	1927	1983
Dominic Barberi	1849	1963
Dominic Collins, SJ	1602	1992
Donizetti Tavares de Lima	1961	2019
Edigna	1109	1600
Edmund Bojanowski	1871	1999
Edmund Catherick	1642	1929
Edmund Ignatius Rice	1844	1996
Eduardo Farre	1936	2007
Eduardo Francisco Pironio	1998	2023
Eduard Profittlich	1942	2025
Edvige Carboni	1952	2017
Edward Oldcorne, SJ	1606	1929
Edward Osbaldeston	1594	1987
Edward Poppe	1924	1999
Elena Aiello	1961	2011
Elena Duglioli	1472	1828
Elena Guerra	1914	1959
Elena Valentinis	1458	1848
Elias Peter Hoayek	1931	2019
Elisabetta Canori Mora, OSsT	1825	1994
Elisabetta Martinez	1991	2023
Elisabetta Sanna	1857	2016
Elisabetta Vendramini	1860	1990
Elisa Angela Meneguzzi	1941	2002
Émilie d'Oultremont	1878	1997
Émilie Tavernier Gamelin, SP	1851	2001
Enrichetta Alfieri	1951	2011
Enrico Rebuschini	1938	1997
Eugene Bossilkov	1952	1998
Eustáquio van Lieshout	1943	2006
Eutychius of Como	539	pre-congregation
Federico Albert	1876	1984
Félicité Pricet	1745	1794
Fernando Olmedo Reguera	1936	2013
Flavianus (Ya'Qūb) Michael Malke	1915	2015
Fra Angelico (Guido di Pietro), OP	1455	1982
Francesco Bonifacio	1946	2008
Francesco Faà di Bruno	1888	1988
Francesco Spoto	1964	2007
Francinaina Cirer Carbonell	1855	1989
Francis of Fabriano	1322	1775
Francis Xavier Seelos	1867	2000
Francisca de Paula de Jesus (Nhá Chica)	1895	2013
Francisco de Paula Victor	1905	2015
Francisco Garate SJ	1929	1985
Francisco Palau	1872	1980
Fulton Sheen	1979	2026
Franciszek Ulma	1944	2023
Franciszka Siedliska (Maria of Jesus)	1902	1989
Françoise d'Amboise	1485	1863
Franz Jägerstätter	1943	2007
Frédéric Janssoone OFM	1916	1988
Frézal Tardieu	1871	2023
Gennaro Maria Sarnelli, CSsR	1744	1996
Georg Häfner, OCDS	1942	2011
George Napper	1610	1929
Gertrude of Aldenberg, OPraem	1297	1728
Ghébrē-Michael	1855	1926
Giacomo Benefatti	1332	1859
Giacomo Bianconi	1301	1672
Giles of Santarém (or of Portugal), OP	1265	1748
Giovanna Francesca Michelotti	1888	1975
Giovanni Antonio Farina	1888	2001
Giovanni Battista Mazzucconi	1855	1984
Giovanni Dominici	1420	1832
Giovanni Maria Boccardo	1913	1998
Giovanni da Penna	1271	1806
Giovanni Schiavo	1967	2017
Giuseppe Baldo	1915	1989
Giuseppe Beotti	1944	2023
Giuseppe Puglisi	1993	2013
Giuseppe Toniolo	1918	2012
Giselle of Bavaria Queen consort of Hungary	1065	1975
Giuseppina Gabriela Bonino	1906	1995
Gundisalvus of Amarante, OP	1259	1561
Gregor Lakota	1950	2001
Grimoaldo of the Purification	1902	1995
Guadalupe Ortiz de Landázuri	1975	2019
Gundekar	1075	pre-congregation
Gunther of Bohemia	1045	
Hanna Helena Chrzanowska	1973	2018
Helen Enselmini	1242	1695
Helena Stollenwerk	1900	1995
Heinrich of Treviso (Henry, Arrigo)	1315	1750
Henri Planchat	1871	2023
Henry Suso, OP	1366	1831
Hildegard Burjan	1933	2012
Hryhorij Chomyszyn (Grzegorz)	1947	2001
Hugh Cook Faringdon	1539	1895
Humphrey Middlemore	1535	1886
Ignatius Maloyan	1915	2001
Imelda Lambertini	1333	1826
Inácio de Azevedo and 39 Companions, SJ	1570	1854
Ingrid of Skänninge	1282	1499
Ippolito (Hippolytus) Galantini	1619	1825
Isabel Cristina Mrad Campos	1982	2022
Isidore of Saint Joseph	1916	1984
Isidore Bakanja	1909	1994
István Sándor, SDB	1953	2013
Itala Mela	1957	2015
Ivan Merz	1928	2003
Ivan Slezyuk	1973	2001
Jacinto Vera Durán	1881	2023
Jacobus de Voragine	1298	1816
Jacques-Désiré Laval	1864	1979
Jakob Gapp	1943	1996
Jakob (Franz Alexander) Kern, OPraem	1924	1998
James Salomoni	1314	1568
Jan Beyzym, SJ	1912	2002
Jan Bula	1920	1952
Jan Świerc and 8 Companions		1941–1942
Jerome de Angelis, SJ	1623	1867
Jerzy Popiełuszko	1984	2010
Jildo Irwa	1918	2002
Joan Roig i Diggle	1936	2020
Joana, Princess of Portugal	1490	1693
John Baptist Scalabrini	1901	1997
John Pibush	1601	1929
Jolenta of Poland	1298	1927
Jordan Forzatè, OSB	1248	1767
Jordan of Pisa, OP	1311	1838
Jordan of Saxony, OP	1237	1825
Josaphata Hordashevska	1919	2001
José Gregorio Hernández	1919	2020
José Olallo	1889	2008
Joseph Gérard	1914	1988
Joseph (Eustachius) Kugler, OH	1946	2009
Josephine Leroux	1794	1920
Józef Ulma	1944	2023
Józef Cebula, OMI	1941	1999
Juan de Palafox y Mendoza	1659	2011
Juan Nepomuceno Zegrí Moreno	1905	2003
Juana María Condesa Lluch	1916	2003
Jurgis Matulaitis-Matulevičius	1927	1987
Karl Leisner	1945	1996
Kamen Vitchev, AA	1952	2002
Karolina Gerhardinger (Maria Theresia of Jesus), SSND		
Klara (Ludwika) Szczęsna	1916	2015
Ladislas Radigue	1871	2023
László Batthyány-Strattmann	1931	2003
Laura Vicuña	1904	1988
Leonardo Kimura	1619	1867
Leonid Feodorov	1935	2001
Leonella Sgorbati	2006	2018
Leopoldina Naudet	1834	2017
Lindalva Justo de Oliveira	1993	2007
Lorenza Diaz Bolanos	1936	2013
Louis-Zéphirin Moreau	1901	1987
Louise of Savoy, OSC	1503	1839
Lucas Tristanyi	1936	2007
Lucia Khambang, LHC	1940	1989
Luca Passi	1866	2013
Lucy Brocadelli, TOSD	1544	1710
Ludovica Albertoni	1533	1671
Ludovico of Casoria	1885	1993
Ludovicus Baba	1624	1867
Ludovicus (or Louis) Sasada, OFM	1624	1867
Luigi Boccardo	1936	2007
Luigi Caburlotto	1897	2015
Luigi Novarese	1984	2013
Luigi Rabatà	1443	1490
Luigi Variara	1923	2002
Luis Sotelo, OFM	1624	1867
Luis Magaña Servin	1928	2004
Mafalda of Portugal	1256	1793
Maddalena Caterina Morano	1908	1994
Maddalena Panattieri	1503	1897
Malgorzata Szewczyk	1905	2013
Manuel Gómez González	1924	2007
Manuela de Jesús Arias Espinosa	1981	2012
Marcel Callo	1945	1987
Marcelina Darowska	1911	1996
Marcelino Rouchouze	1871	2023
Margaret Ball	1584	1992
Margaret of Lorraine	1463	1921
Margaret Pole, 8th Countess of Salisbury	1541	1886
Margaret of Savoy	1464	1669
Margareta Ebner	1351	1979
Maria Adeodata Pisani	1855	2001
Maria Alfonsina Danil Ghattas (Maria Soultaneh)	1843	1927
Maria Ana (Peregrina) Mogas	1886	1996
María Antonia Bandrés, F.I.	1919	1996
Maria Bartolomea Bagnesi, TOSD	1577	1804
Maria Bolognesi	1980	2013
Maria Concepción Barrecheguren García	1927	2023
Maria Theresia Bonzel	1905	2013
María Dolores Rodríguez Sopeña	1918	2003
Maria Gabriella Sagheddu	1939	1981
Maria Josefa Karolina Brader	1943	2003
Maria Laura Mainetti	2000	2021
Maria Margherita of the Sacred Heart (Maria Anna Rosa Caiani)	1921	1989
Maria Phon	1940	1989
Maria Raffaella Cimatti, HSM	1945	1996
Maria Restituta	1943	1998
Maria Romero Meneses	1977	2002
Maria Schininà	1910	1990
Maria Teresia Ledóchowska	1922	1975
Maria Ulma	1944	2023
Maria Vittoria De Fornari Strata, OSsA	1617	1828
Mariam Vattalil	1954	1995
Marianna Biernacka	1943	1999
Mariano Arciero	1788	2012
Mariano de la Mata	1983	2006
Marie Anne Blondin	1890	2001
Marie-Clémentine Anuarite Nengapeta	1964	1985
Marie-Geneviève Meunier	1794	1906
Marie-Joseph Cassant	1903	2004
Marie of the Sacred Heart	1889	1946
Marie-Rose Durocher	1912	1984
Marija Petković	1966	2003
Mark Barkworth	1601	1929
Marta Anna Wiecka	1904	2008
Martín de San Nicolás (Lumbreras y Peralta), OAR	1632	1989
Mary of the Divine Heart, RGS	1899	1975
Mary of the Passion	1904	2002
Mary Frances Schervier, TOSF	1876	1974
Mateo Elías Nieves Castillo	1928	1997
Matilde of the Sacred Heart	1841	1902
Matthew Carrieri	1470	1482
Maurice Csák	1336	1494
Maurus Scott	1612	1929
Meinwerk	1036	
Mercedes de Jesús Molina	1828	1883
Metod Dominik Trčka	1959	2001
Michael Iwene Tansi	1903	1964
Michael J. McGivney	1890	2020
Michał Sopoćko	1975	2008
Michele Fasoli	1716	1988
Michelina of Pesaro, TOSF	1356	1737
Miguel Agustín Pro, SJ	1927	1988
Miguel de Carvalho, SJ	1624	1867
Miles Gerard	1590	1929
Miroslav Bulešić	1947	2013
Nazju Falzon	1865	2001
Nemesia (Giulia) Valle	1916	2004
Nicholas Bunkerd Kitbamrung	1944	2000
Nicolas Steno	1686	1988
Nicolò Rusca	1618	2013
Notker the Stammerer	912	1512
Nykyta Budka	1949	2001
Odo of Novara	1200	1859
Odoardo Focherini	1944	2013
Odoric of Pordenone	1331	1775
Omelyan Kovch	1944	2001
Osanna of Cattaro, TOSD	1565	1934
Osanna of Mantua	1505	1694
Otto Neururer	1940	1996
Ozana of Kotor	1565	1934
Pacifico de Valencia OFCap	1936	2001
Patrick O'Hely	1579	1992
Pavol Peter Gojdič	1960	2001
Teofilius Matulionis	1962	2017
Pedro of St Catherine Vásquez, OP	1624	1867
Peter To Rot	1945	1995
Philip Siphong Onphitak	1940	1989
Piedad of the Cross	1916	2004
Pierina Morosini	1957	1987
Pierre-Adrien Toulorge (OPraem)	1793	2012
Pierre de Luxembourg	1387	1527
Pietro Geremia, OP	1452	1784
Polycarpe Tuffier	1871	2023
Tommaso da Olera, OFMCap	1631	2013
Placidio Riccardi	1915	1954
Pope Benedict XI	1304	1736
Pope Eugene III	1151	1872
Pope Gregory X	1276	1713
Pope Innocent V	1276	1898
Pope Innocent XI	1689	1956
Pope John Paul I	1978	2022
Pope Pius IX	1878	2000
Pope Urban II	1099	1881
Pope Urban V	1370	1870
Pope Victor III	1087	1887
Quattrocchi, Luigi Beltrame and Maria Corsini	1951 and 1965	2001
Ralph Ashley, SJ	1606	1929
Ralph Corbie, SJ	1644	1929
Redemptus of the Cross	1638	1900
Richard Whiting	1539	1895
Robert of Arbrissel	1116	
Robert Dibdale	1586	1987
Robert Nutter	1600	1987
Rolando Rivi	1945	2013
Rose-Chrétien de la Neuville	1794	1906
Sadok and 48 Dominican martyrs from Sandomierz	1260	1807
Samuele Marzorati	1716	1988
Sancha of Portugal	1229	1705
Sandra Sabattini	1984	2021
Sára Salkaházi	1944	2006
Sebastian de Aparicio	1600	1789
Sebastian Newdigate	1535	1886
Seraphina Sforza	1478	1754
Solanus Casey	1957	2017
Stanisława Ulma	1944	2023
Stanley Rother	1981	2017
Stefan Wincenty Frelichowski	1945	1999
Stephana de Quinzanis	1530	1740
Stephen Nehmé	1938	2010
Szilárd Bogdánffy	1953	2010
Terence Albert O'Brien	1651	1992
Teresa of Portugal	1250	1705
Teresa Bracco	1944	1988
Teresa Demjanovich, SC	1927	2014
Teresio Olivelli, SC	1945	2018
Thaddeus McCarthy	1492	1896
Theodore Romzha	1947	2001
Thomas of Zumárraga (Tomás del Espíritu Santo), OP	1622	1867
Thomas Cottam	1582	1886
Thomas Percy, 7th Earl of Northumberland	1572	1895
Thomas Thwing	1680	1929
Thurston Hunt	1601	1987
Titus Zeman	1969	2017
Tommaso Reggio	1901	2000
Trương Bửu Diệp	1946	2026
Ulrika	1913	1987
Umberto III, Count of Savoy	1189	1838
Unborn child Ulma	1944	2023
Valentinus Paquay	1905	2003
Vasyl Velychkovsky	1973	2001
Vicenta Chávez Orozco	1949	1997
Victoire Rasoamanarivo	1894	1989
Villana de' Botti, TOSD	1361	1824
Vilmos Apor of Hungary	1945	1997
Vitus of Hungary	1297	c. 1310
Vladimir Ghika	1954	2013
Wiktoria Niemczak Ulma	1944	2023
William Andleby	1597	1929
William Exmew	1535	1886
William Harrington	1594	1929
William Howard, 1st Viscount Stafford	1680	1929
William Joseph Chaminade	1850	2000
Wincenty Kadłubek	1223	1764
Władysław Ulma	1944	2023
Zdenka Cecília Schelingová	1955	2003
Zofia Czeska-Maciejowska	1650	2013

== See also ==
- Chronological list of saints and blesseds
- Beatification
- List of people beatified by Pope John Paul II
- List of saints
- List of venerable people (Catholic)
- List of Servants of God
- List of saints of India
