= Chronological list of saints and blesseds in the 18th century =

A list of people, who died during the 18th century, who have received recognition as Blessed (through beatification) or Saint (through canonization) from the Catholic Church:

Name	Birth	Birthplace	Death	Place of death	Notes
Joseph Oriol	1650		1702		
Blessed Gomidas Keumurgian	1656		1707		
Blessed François de Laval, MEP	1623		1708		First Bishop of Quebec
Blessed Sebastian Valfrè, CO	1629		1710		
Blessed Bonaventure of Potenza	1651		1711		
Joseph Vaz	1651		1711		
Joseph Mary Tomasi, CR	1649		1713		Cardinal
Blessed Francis de Posadas	1644		1713		
Francis de Geronimo, SJ	1642		1716		
Louis Marie de Montfort, SMM	1673		1716		Founder
Blessed Liberatus Weiss, Samuel Marzorati, and Michael Fasoli			1716		
Blessed Anthony Baldinucci, SJ	1665		1717		
Blessed Mary of Turin (Mary of the Angels)	1661		1717		Carmelite nun
John Baptist de La Salle, FSC	1651		1719		
Pacifico of San Severino, OFM	1653		1721		
Veronica Giuliani, OSCCap	1660		1727		
Rose Venerini, PMV	1656		1728		
Thomas of Cori, OFM	1655		1729		
Lucy Filippini, PMF	1672		1732		
John Joseph of the Cross, OFM	1654		1734		
Jeanne Delanoue, CSAP	1666		1736		
Bartholomew Alvarez			1737		
Blessed Emmanuel d'Abreu			1737		
Blessed John Gaspard Cratz (Joanes Kaspar Kratz)			1737		
Blessed Mary Magdalene Martinengo da Barco	1687		1737		
Blessed Vincent da Cunha			1737		
Blessed Angelus of Acri	1669		1739		
Saint Theophilus of Corte	1676		1740		
Blessed Peter Vigne	1670		1740		
Blessed Rafal Chylinski	1694		1741		
Francis Anthony Fasani, OFMConv	1681		1742		
Maria Crescentia Höss, TOR	1682		1744		
Blessed Gennaro Maria Sarnelli, CSsR	1702		1744		
Francis Gil de Frederich			1745		Martyr of Vietnam
Matthew Alonso Leziniana			1745		Martyr of Vietnam
Peter Sanz, OP			1747		Bishop of Maurocastrum, Martyr of China
Francis Diaz			1748		
Joachim Royo			1748		
Blessed Francis Serrano			1748		Bishop of Tipasa, Martyr of China
Blessed John Alcober			1748		
Crispin of Viterbo, OFMCap	1668		1750		
Leonard of Port Maurice, OFM	1676		1751		
Devasahayam Pillai	1712		1752		First Indian Martyr; First lay man to be elevated to the rank of the Blessed and Saint in India
Gerard Majella, CSsR	1726		1755		
John Baptist de Rossi	1698		1764		
Pompilius-Mary of Saint Nicholas (Pompilio Pirotti)	1710		1766		
Teresa Margaret Redi, OCD	1747		1770		
Marie-Marguerite d'Youville, SCG	1701		1771		
Hyacinth Castaneda			1773		
Vincent Liem			1773		
Paul of the Cross, CP	1694		1775		Founder of the Passionists
Ignatius of Laconi, OFM	1701		1781		
Benedict Joseph Labre, TOSF	1748		1783		
Junípero Serra, OFM	1713		1784		
Alphonsus Liguori, CSsR	1696		1787		Founder of the Redemptorists, Bishop of St. Agatha
Felix of Nicosia, OFM	1715		1787		
Mary Frances of the Five Wounds, FMM	1715		1791		
Blessed John du Lau and Companions			1792		
John-Michael Langevin			1793		
Frances de Croissy			1794		
John Baptist Souzy and 63 companions			1794		
Madeleine Brideau			1794		
Madeleine Lidoine			1794		
Marie Claude Brard			1794		
Marie Croissy			1794		
Marie Dufour			1794		
Marie Hanisset			1794		
Marie-Geneviève Meunier			1794		Martyr of Compiègne
Marie Trezelle			1794		
Blessed Antoinette Roussel			1794		
Blessed Frances Brideau			1794		
Blessed Francis Meziere	1745		1794		
Blessed Georges Edmund Rene	1748		1794		
Blessed Jean Bourdon	1747		1794		
Blessed Jean-Nicolas Cordier	1710		1794		
Blessed Josephine Leroux, OSC			1794		Martyr of the French Revolution
Blessed Juliette Verolot			1794		
Blessed Marie Magdalen Fontaine			1794		
Blessed Marie Rose Deloye and Companions			1794		
Blessed Martyrs of Compiègne, OCD			1794		Martyrs of the French Revolution
Blessed Noel Pinot			1794		
Blessed Rose Chretien			1794		
Blessed Teresa Fantou			1794		
Blessed Ursulines of Valenciennes			1794		Martyrs of the French Revolution
Blessed William Repin and 98 companions	1793		1794		Martyr of Angers
Blesseds Carola Lucas, Félicité Pricet, Victoria Gusteau, and Monica Pichery			1794		Martyrs of Angers
Blesseds Françoise Trehet and Jeanne Veron			1794		
Blesseds Gabrielle Fontaine, Mary Frances Lanel, Therese Fantou, and Jeanne Gerard			1794		
Blesseds Pierre-Michel Noel and Claude Richard			1794		
Blessed Peter Rene Rogue	1758		1796		
Emmanuel Trieu			1798		Martyr of Vietnam
John Dat	1764		1798		Martyr of Vietnam

== See also ==
- Christianity in the 18th century
