= Meneguzzi =

Meneguzzi is a surname and may refer to:

- Elisa Angela Meneguzzi (1901-1941), Italian Roman Catholic
- Paolo Meneguzzi (born 1976), Swiss Italian singer
