= Giacomo Benefatti =

Italian Catholic priest (died 1332)

Blessed Bishop Giacomo Benefatti O.P.
- Bishop of Mantua
- Church: Roman Catholic Church
- Diocese: Mantua
- See: Mantua
- Appointed: 10 January 1304
- Installed: 1304
- Term ended: 19 November 1332

Orders
- Consecration: c. 1320 by Pope John XXII
- Rank: Bishop

Personal details
- Born: Giacomo Benefatti; Unknown Mantua, Captaincy-General of Mantua
- Died: 19 November 1332 Mantua, Captaincy-General of Mantua
- Buried: Mantua Cathedral, Italy

Sainthood
- Feast day: 19 November
- Venerated in: Roman Catholic Church
- Beatified: 22 September 1859; Saint Peter's Basilica, Papal States by Pope Pius IX
- Attributes: Episcopal attire; Dominican habit

Giacomo Benefatti (died 19 November 1332) was an Italian Catholic priest and professed member of the Order of Preachers who ascended to the position of Bishop of Mantua. Benefatti became noted for his tender care of the ill during epidemics of plague and both Pope Benedict XI — a close personal friend — and Pope John XXII held him in high esteem.

Benefatti's reputation for personal holiness endured in the centuries after his death and the confirmation of his local 'cultus' - or popular devotion - allowed for Pope Pius IX to confirm the late bishop's beatification on 22 September 1859.

== Life ==
Giacomo Benefatti was born in Mantua at some point in the mid 1200s to nobles.

He enrolled in the Order of Preachers in 1290 and was later ordained to the priesthood. He acquired his master's degree in his theological studies from the University of Paris and later earned his doctorate in theological studies. Benefatti became a close and personal friend of the fellow Dominican friar Cardinal Niccolò Boccasini who later ascended as Pope Benedict XI. The new pontiff appointed him as a papal legate and then appointed him as the Bishop of Mantua at the beginning of 1304. Benefatti decided to raise funds for refurbishing churches in the diocese as well as rebuilding the Mantua Cathedral. As a bishop he attended the coronation of King Henry VII in Milan and participated in the Council of Vienne. He also knew Ludovico I Gonzaga when the latter aided in providing donations for the cathedral renovation.

Bishop Benefatti became noted among the faithful of the diocese for his careful attention to poor people as well as for his ardent dedication to the ill during a period of plague epidemic. He also served as a papal legate for Pope John XXII. The pontiff held him in high esteem and in 1320 conferred episcopal consecration on Benefatti who had not received it at that point - but sources differ on whether it was in 1320 or back in 1304 after being appointed as bishop. He earned the moniker of the "Father of the Poor".

Benefatti died on 19 November 1332. His remains were found to be incorrupt in 1480 after the Dominican church he was interred in was undergoing reconstruction and his remains were found to be still incorrupt in 1604. His remains were moved to the diocese's main cathedral in 1823.

== Beatification ==
Benefatti's beatification received ratification on 22 September 1859 once Pope Pius IX confirmed the local 'cultus' - or popular veneration - to the late bishop existed after his death and endured through the centuries.

== See also ==
- Catholic Church in Italy
- Chronological list of saints and blesseds
- List of beatified people
