= Federico Albert =

Italian Roman Catholic priest

Blessed Federico Albert
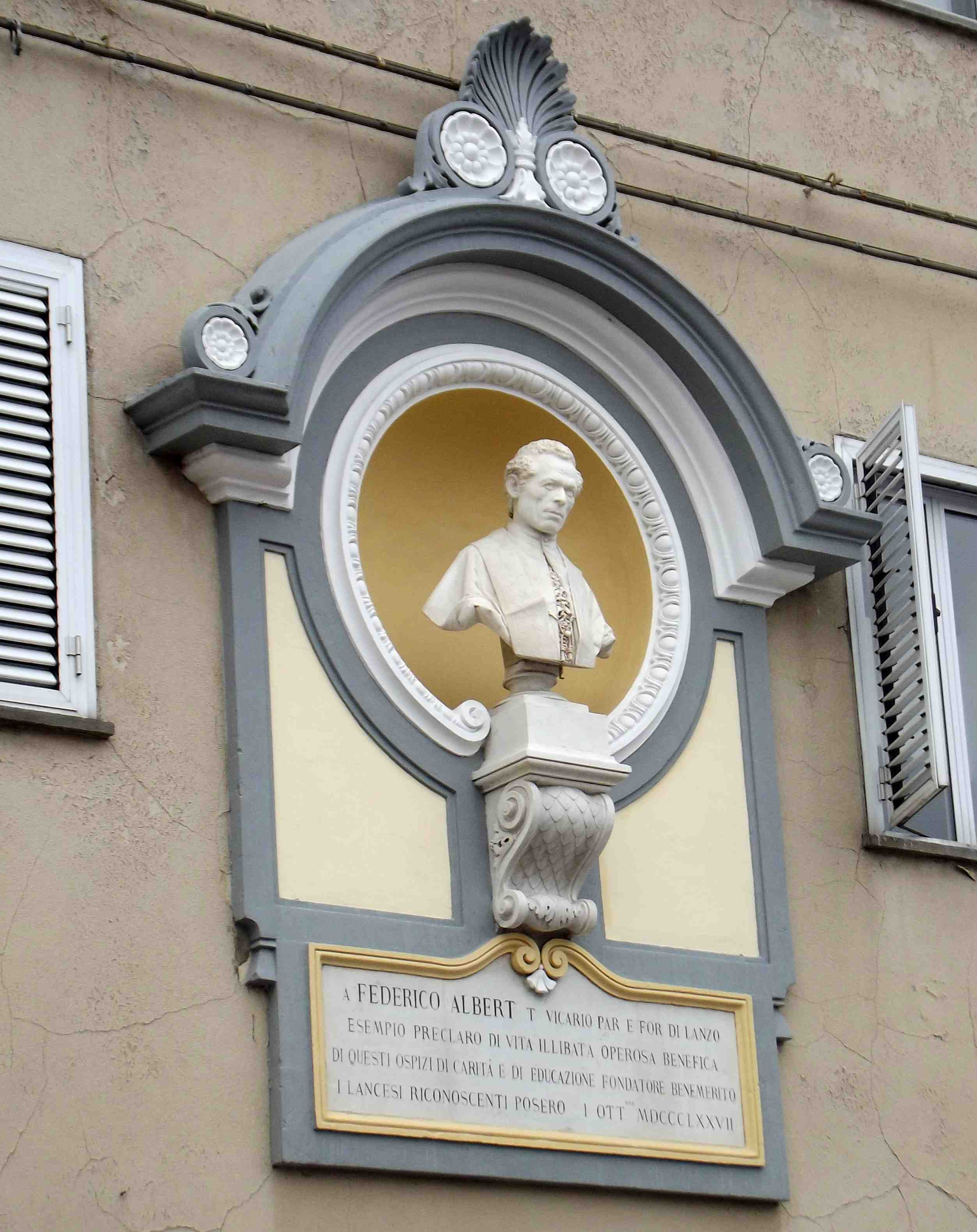
- Bust.
- Born: 16 October 1820; Turin, Kingdom of Sardinia
- Died: 30 September 1876 (aged 55); Lanzo Torinese, Turin, Kingdom of Italy
- Venerated in: Roman Catholic Church
- Beatified: 30 September 1984, Saint Peter's Square, Vatican City by Pope John Paul II
- Feast: 30 September
- Attributes: Priest's cassock
- Patronage: Vincentian Sisters of Mary Immaculate; Lanzo Torinese

Federico Albert (16 October 1820 – 30 September 1876) was an Italian Roman Catholic priest. He established the Vincentian Sisters of Mary Immaculate, also known as the Albertines - and he established this order in order to work with the poor of Turin.

He was beatified on 30 September 1984.

== Life ==
Federico Albert was born in Turin on 16 October 1820 as the first of six children to Luigi Albert and Lucia Riccio. He spent most of his childhood in the care of his maternal grandparents while he studied in school.

At the age of fifteen his parents wanted him to pursue a career as a soldier and his father admitted him to the barracks of Turin. But it was then that he realized in the Church of Saint Philip that he was called to religious life and was called to serve as a priest. His father was both surprised and disappointed when he was told about this but relented to the wishes of his son. Albert - in 1836 - donned the cassock and started his studies for the priesthood under the Oratorians. He graduated in his theological studies in mid 1843 and was ordained as a priest on 10 June 1843.

Albert was appointed in 1847 as the chaplain to the court of King Charles Albert and he catered to the apostolic needs of those in the court. At the same time he was inclined to help the poor and the destitute in Turin and decided to do whatever possible to raise their spirits. With church and state tension he remained true to the Gospel teachings and offered suggestions to the court wherever possible. He had also earned the esteem of King Vittorio Emmanuele II. He soon became a collaborator of John Bosco in 1848 to preach in Valdocco. From 1850 until 1852 he served in the parish of Saint Charles and was later appointed as a vicar and pastor in Lanzo Torinese in 1852.

He founded a home for children in 1858 and another in 1859 for abandoned girls. He also provided them with a school in 1866 with courses in French and music amongst others. To continue his work he established the Vincentian Sisters of Mary Immaculate in 1869 which soon became known as the Albertines. It was an order devoted to assisting the poor and promoting the concept of apostolate among the faithful. At this time he rejected proposals to become a bishop of a vacant diocese since he wanted to remain in his parish to continue his work.

He soon became ill and it was John Bosco who administered the last rites to him. Albert died in the morning of 30 September 1876. He was buried in Lanzo but was moved in 1877 to the parish church of Saint Peter in Chains.

== Beatification ==
Albert's spiritual writings were approved by theologians on 3 March 1934, and his cause was formally opened on 13 June 1934, granting him the title Servant of God. Two processes were held and were both ratified on 17 April 1940 to proceed to a process of further evaluation in Rome. Pope Pius XII approved that Albert had lived a life of heroic virtue and declared him to be Venerable on 16 January 1953.

The process for a miracle commenced in 1962 and gathered all documentation on it until 1971 when the process concluded and documents were submitted to the Congregation for the Causes of Saints. It was ratified in 1983 and allowed for Pope John Paul II to approve it on 7 April 1984. He beatified Albert on 30 September 1984.

== See also ==
- Catholic Church in Italy
- Chronological list of saints and blesseds
- List of beatified people
