= Aimone Taparelli =

Italian Roman Catholic priest (c. 1395–1495)

Blessed Aimone Taparelli O.P.
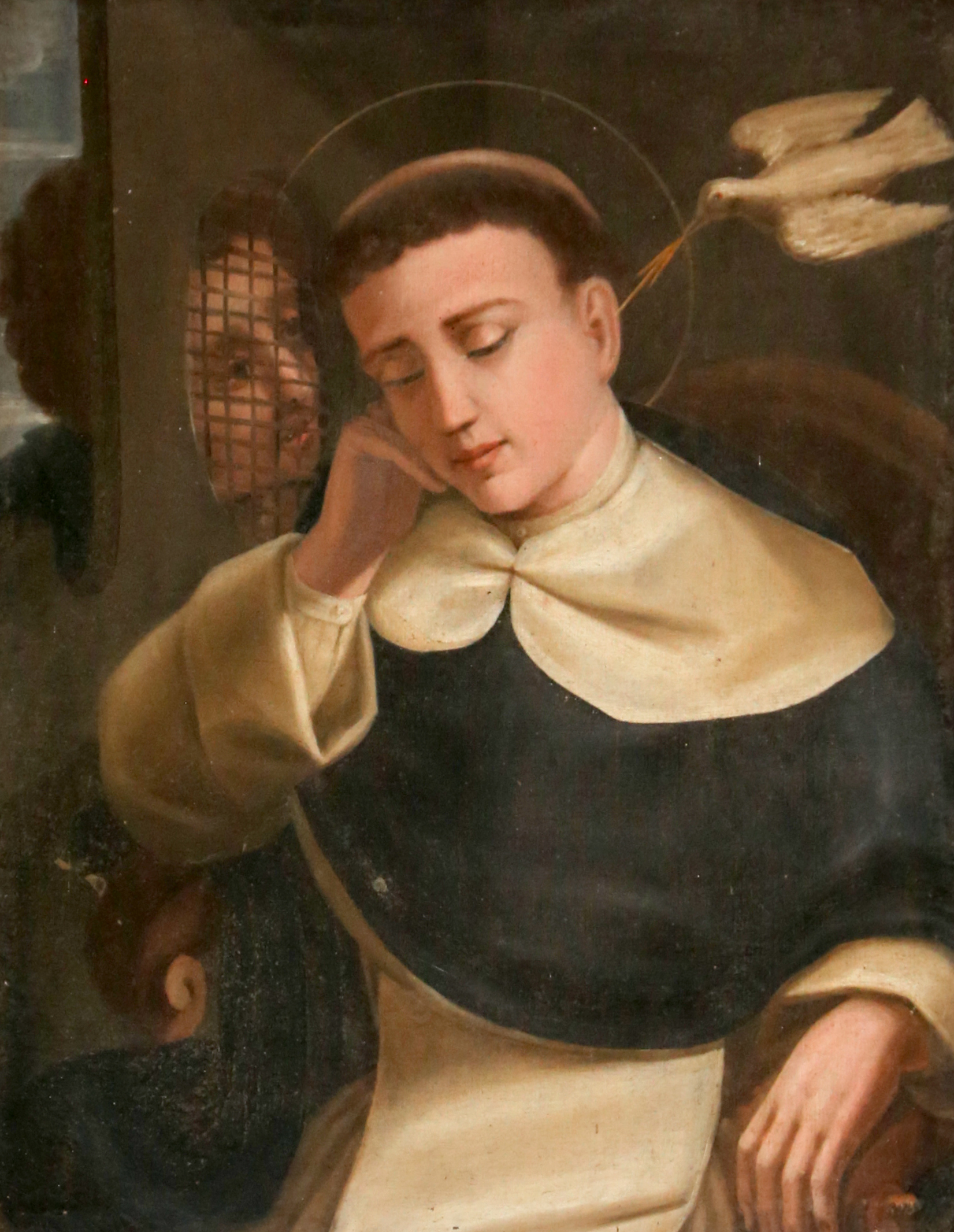

Priest
- Born: c. 1395; Savigliano, Kingdom of Piedmont-Sardinia
- Died: 15 August 1495 (aged 100); Savigliano, Kingdom of Piedmont-Sardinia
- Venerated in: Roman Catholic Church
- Beatified: 29 May 1856, Saint Peter's Basilica, Papal States by Pope Pius IX
- Feast: 14 August; 18 August (Dominicans)
- Attributes: Dominican habit Dove

Aimone Taparelli (c. 1395 – 15 August 1495) was an Italian Roman Catholic priest and a professed member from the Order of Preachers. He served as an Inquisitor-General for his order in the Lombard and Liguria regions and became a travelling preacher in northern Italian cities.

Pope Pius IX confirmed his beatification in mid-1856.

== Life ==
Aimone Taparelli was born around 1395 in Savigliano to nobles who were the counts of Lagnasco. He first pursued a career in law and even married but soon became widowed and felt the call to the religious life instead. In the 1500s - after him - there was the Bishop Gianmaria Taparelli and in the 1600s there was the Jesuit priest Cesare Michele Taparelli who moved to the United States of America.

Taparelli studied - and later taught - at a college in Turin and entered the Order of Preachers at Savigliano in 1441 at the San Domenico convent; he also served as the chaplain to Amadeus IX, Duke of Savoy but left his court because he was not satisfied with being there. Taparelli served as the Inquisitor-General for his order in the Lombard and Ligurian regions. He was appointed as such to replace the murdered Bartolomeo Cerveri. He organized for the relics of Antonio Pavoni to be moved to Savigliano and interred at the Dominican church there. In 1468 he became abbot of his convent and then prior of it in 1483; he was confirmed twice as the Inquisitor-General in 1483 and in 1489.

He died - he predicted his death date - on 15 August 1495 and his remains were later moved to the Saint Dominic church in Turin sometime in the 1900s.

=== Beatification ===
Pope Pius IX beatified the late Dominican priest on 29 May 1856 in Saint Peter's Basilica.
