= Elena Valentinis =

15th-century Italian nun

Blessed Elena Valentinis O.S.A.

Laywoman
- Born: 1396; Udine, Patriarchal State of Aquileia
- Died: 23 April 1458 (aged 62); Udine, Republic of Venice
- Venerated in: Roman Catholic Church
- Beatified: 27 September 1848, Saint Peter's Basilica, Papal States by Pope Pius IX
- Major shrine: Udine Cathedral, Italy
- Feast: 23 April
- Attributes: Augustinian habit
- Patronage: Widows; Against temptations

Elena Valentinis (1396 - 23 April 1458) was an Italian Roman Catholic professed religious from the tertiaries of the Order of Saint Augustine. Valentinis was born to nobles and married a knight during her adolescence while mothering six children before she was widowed in 1441. She soon became a professed religious and dedicated herself to austerities and a life of complete penance.

Her beatification was ratified on 27 September 1848 after Pope Pius IX approved her local "cultus" - or popular veneration.

== Life ==
Elena Valentinis was born in Udine in 1396 to the nobleman Count Valentinis - a lord of Maniago. She had at least one sister: Perfetta.

In her adolescence in 1411 she married the Florentine knight Antonio del Cavalcanti and the pair had six children - three males and three females. He died in 1441 and as a result she cut off her hair and placed it with her jewels in his coffin and said: "These I wore for love of you; take them to the grave with you". Valentinis later attended a sermon that Fra Angelo da San Severino gave at the Augustinian church of Santa Lucia and decided then and there to join the order. She became a professed third order member of the Order of Saint Augustine (the first for the third order in Udine) sometime in 1441 where she soon became known for her several austerities and her life of dedication to her fellow man and woman. One of her austerities was to take a vow of silence though she spoke on Christmas night alone.

She continued to live at home though later moved in with her sister in 1446 who also was a third order Augustinian and resided there until her death. Valentinis was known for her ecstatic trances as well as the noted gift of healing others. She became known for her ardent devotion to the Eucharist and to the Passion of Jesus Christ. Valentinis also placed 33 pebbles in her shoes as an act of penance.

Valentinis became bedridden in 1455 after fracturing both her femurs in a fall and she preferred a pallet of stones and straw to an actual bed. Her declining health led to her death on the Saturday evening of 23 April 1458. On her deathbed Mass was celebrated and friars from a convent not too far from her came to sing psalms. Her remains were interred in Santa Lucia but later moved to the Udine Cathedral in 1845.

== Beatification ==
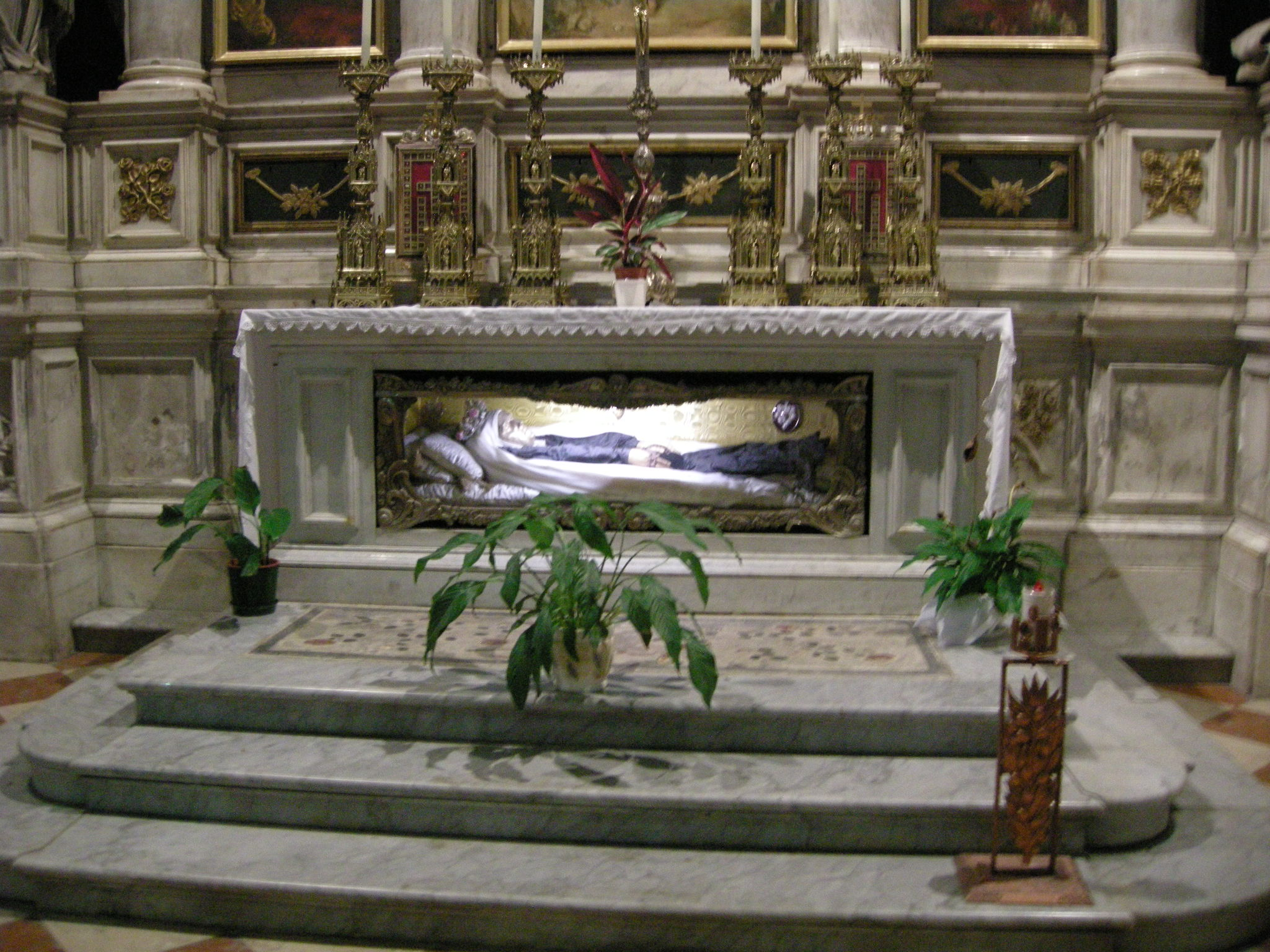
Tomb in the Udine Cathedral.

Her local "cultus" - otherwise known as popular veneration to her - received official ratification from Pope Pius IX on 27 September 1848 which allowed for him to issue his approval for her beatification.

== See also ==
- Catholic Church in Italy
- Chronological list of saints and blesseds
- List of beatified people
