= Enrichetta Alfieri =

Italian Roman Catholic religious sister

Blessed Enrichetta Alfieri SDC
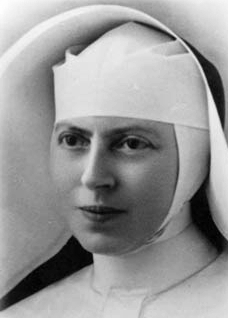

Virgin
- Born: 23 February 1891; Borgo Vercelli, Vercelli, Kingdom of Italy
- Died: 23 November 1951 (aged 60); Milan, Italy
- Venerated in: Roman Catholic Church
- Beatified: 26 June 2011, Milan Cathedral, Italy by Cardinal Angelo Amato
- Feast: 23 November; 26 November (Archdiocese of Milan)

Enrichetta Alfieri (23 February 1891 – 23 November 1951), born Maria Angela Domenica Alfieri, was an Italian Roman Catholic religious sister and a member of the Sisters of Divine Charity.

Alfieri was called also "the mother of San Vittore" and "the angel of San Vittore" due to her extensive work in the San Vittore prison in Milan. She worked there during World War II when the Nazis arrested her on the charge of espionage. The intervention of the Cardinal Archbishop of Milan Alfredo Ildefonso Schuster secured her release.

Pope Benedict XVI approved her beatification and delegated Cardinal Angelo Amato to preside over the beatification celebration at Milan Cathedral on 26 June 2011.

== Life ==
Maria Angela Domenica Alfieri was born in 1891 in Borgo Vercelli to Giovanni Alfieri and Rosa Compagnone. She was the eldest and her two sisters were Angela and Adele while her brother and final sibling was Carlo.

Her parents educated her as a child before she attended school. She excelled in art and in needlework. She also tended to the fields at home and aided her mother with housework.

From her childhood it was clear to her that she was to enter the religious life and tried to do so in her adolescence much to the chagrin of her parents who asked her to remain at home until she turned 20. She became a postulant of Saint Jeanne-Antide Thouret's congregation on 20 December 1911. She received a diploma in education on 12 July 1917. Alfieri worked as a kindergarten teacher in Vercelli but was forced to relinquish her position in 1917 after it was found that she had diagnosed Pott's disease.

Alfieri was cured – in what was deemed a miracle – on 25 February 1923 after having gone on a pilgrimage to Lourdes in France. In April 1920 she had gone to Milan for tests and treatment – without results – and was later found to have degenerating spondylitis. Her condition deteriorated in Vercelli and she was often immobilized with great pain. In May 1922 her superiors had sent her to Lourdes for a pilgrimage in the hopes that a miracle would be performed; nothing happened and she instead took a bottle of water from Lourdes with her. She would sip from it when feeling great pain. In January 1923 doctors diagnosed her as being incurable and she received the Anointing of the Sick on 5 February 1923. On 25 February 1923 at 8 p.m. she sipped the water and briefly fainted and heard a voice: "Get up". She rose from bed after feeling no pain and later wrote of this moment: "the doors of Heaven are closed; those of life are opened up again."

She recovered so well that on 24 May 1923 she was assigned to administer to prisoners in Milan at the prison of San Vittore. She became well known amongst prisoners for her tender care and affection and was as such given the two monikers of the "Mother of San Vittore" and the "Angel of San Vittore"; she was appointed as its superior in 1939.

The prison later became an S.S. headquarters for the Nazis during World War II and the prison later housed priests and nuns in addition to Jewish people and resistance fighters. Alfieri and her fellow religious helped to smuggle supplies and messages out to Jews and others fleeing persecution and she also worked with church authorities to intervene for those that needed desperate aid; she also worked with the Cardinal Archbishop of Milan Alfredo Ildefonso Schuster. On 23 September 1944 the Nazis intercepted a message directed to her and so she was arrested on the charge of espionage and was sentenced either to death or imprisonment in the Third Reich at a concentration camp; she spent eleven days in detention. Ecclesiastical figures – like Cardinal Schuster – intervened and so she was released and moved to Brescia where she wrote a memoir of her imprisonment; Schuster had also written to Benito Mussolini asking him for a pardon of Alfieri. On 7 May 1945 she was reassigned to San Vittore prison and administered to prisoners of war and their former jailors.

Alfieri fractured her femur after a fall outside the Milan Cathedral in the piazza in September 1950 and she also fell ill due to bad liver functioning and a tired heart; she once said of her impending death: "I didn't believe it was so nice to die". She died at 3:00 p.m. on 23 November 1951. Inmates at San Vittore went to visit her remains prior to her funeral as a mark of respect to the "Angel of San Vittore". She was exhumed on 1 March 2011.

== Beatification ==
The beatification process was opened under Pope John Paul II after she became titled as a Servant of God on 22 November 1994 when the Congregation for the Causes of Saints issued the official "nihil obstat" ('nothing against') to the cause being opened. Cardinal Carlo Maria Martini inaugurated the diocesan process on 30 January 1995 and closed it on 20 April 1996; the C.C.S. validated the process on 6 December 1996.

The C.C.S. received the Positio in 2001 and passed it to a congress of theologians on 6 March 2009 for their official approval. The latter's positive verdict allowed for the C.C.S. themselves to also vote in favor of the dossier on 17 November 2009. Pope Benedict XVI proclaimed Alfieri to be Venerable on 19 December 2009 after he confirmed that the late religious had lived a model life of heroic virtue.

The process for investigating a miracle opened on 28 May 2002 in a diocesan process that Cardinal Martini inaugurated in the Archdiocese of Milan and closed on 29 June 2002. The process received C.C.S. validation on 12 March 2004 and received the approval of the medical board on 28 October 2010. Theologians also approved the miracle on 14 January 2011 and the C.C.S. also voted to approve the miracle on 1 March 2011. Pope Benedict XVI approved the healing to be a credible miracle on 2 April 2011. The miracle involved the 1990s cure of Stefania Copelli.

Benedict XVI delegated Cardinal Angelo Amato to preside over the beatification outside of the Milan Cathedral on 26 June 2011.

The current postulator assigned to the cause is Sr. Anna Antida Casolino.

== See also ==
- Catholic Church in Italy
- Chronological list of saints and blesseds
- List of beatified people
