= Giuseppe Baldo (priest) =

Italian Roman Catholic priest

Blessed Giuseppe Baldo
- Born: 19 February 1843; Puegnano, Brescia, Kingdom of Lombardy–Venetia
- Died: 24 October 1915 (aged 72); Ronco all'Adige, Verona, Kingdom of Italy
- Venerated in: Roman Catholic Church
- Beatified: 31 October 1989, Saint Peter's Square, Vatican City by Pope John Paul II
- Feast: 24 October
- Attributes: Cassock
- Patronage: Little Daughters of Saint Joseph; Sisters of Charity of Saint Mary

Giuseppe Baldo (19 February 1843 – 24 October 1915) was an Italian Roman Catholic priest and the founder of both the Sisters of Charity of Saint Mary (1882) and the Little Daughters of Saint Joseph (1894). Baldo served as a parish priest in the Diocese of Verona and tended to the old and the poor.

Baldo was beatified on 31 October 1989.

== Life ==
Giuseppe Baldo was born in Brescia on 19 February 1843 as the sixth of nine children to the farmer Angelo Baldo and the midwife Ippolita Casa; six of the Baldo's nine children died as infants. He received his baptism on 20 February in the parish church of Saint Michael the Archangel from Domenico Ottini.

He commenced his studies for the priesthood in Verona on 7 December 1858 and had excellent results in all of his studies. The Bishop of Verona, Luigi di Canossa, ordained him to the priesthood on 15 August 1865, the Feast of the Assumption of Mary, after the seminarian received a papal dispensation from Pope Pius IX having not yet reached the correct age for ordination. Until 1866 he was an assistant vicar in the parish of Montorio and served as an educator at a diocesan-run college at the behest of the bishop until 1877. It was then that he received permission to go to Ronco all'Adige to administer and remained there until his death. He took possession of his parish on 17 November 1877 almost hidden to avoid clashes with the Freemasons who threatened to kill him if he did it with the usual religious pomp.

In 1882, Baldo established a new religious congregation in the name of the Sisters of Charity of Saint Mary. But in 1888 he decided to found another order after having established a kindergarten and the canteen for malnourished children that he had set up around this time. He opened a small hospital dubbed "Casa Ippolita" in 1888 while in 1893 establishing a shelter for older people. He attracted the first potential postulants for his new order on 13 October 1894. On 21 November 1894 he founded the Little Daughters of Saint Joseph while the first ten postulants received their habits on 24 June 1896 from the Bishop of Verona Cardinal Luigi di Canossa. The first seven female religious made their profession into the order on 25 June 1897.

The first superior appointed was not Baldo but rather Clementina Forante who managed the congregation from 1864 until 1928. The order received diocesan approval on 3 May 1895 while receiving the decree of praise from Pope Pius X on 10 February 1913 and full papal approval, after Baldo's death, from Pope Pius XII on 3 April 1940.

Baldo died on 24 October 1915 after 22 months of a long and painful illness. His remains were transferred to the motherhouse of the congregation on 7 September 1950. His order now operates in Georgia, Kenya, Uganda, Italy and Rwanda amongst other places; as of 2005 there were 405 religious in 68 houses.

== Beatification ==
The beatification process commenced in the Diocese of Verona in an informative process opened on 24 October 1955 until its conclusion later in 1957 after it was determined all available documentation and interrogatories had been collated. This also contained Baldo's approved writings which received approval of theologians in 1962 and allowed for the Congregation of Rites to validate the informative process. An apostolic process was later held. Baldo became known as a Servant of God with the formal commencement of the cause under Pope Paul VI on 11 June 1977.

In 1985 the positio was submitted to the Congregation for the Causes of Saints in Rome. Baldo was proclaimed to be venerable on 26 January 1987 after Pope John Paul II confirmed that Baldo had practised heroic virtue. The pope approved a miracle attibuted to Baldo's intercession in 1989 and presided over Baldo's beatification in Saint Peter's Square on 31 October 1989.

== See also ==
- Chronological list of saints and blesseds
- List of beatified people
