= Elena Duglioli =

Italian Roman Catholic aristocrat

Blessed Elena Duglioli
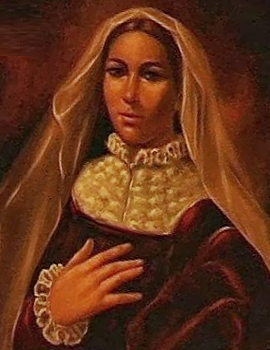
- Born: 1472; Bologna, Republic of Florence
- Died: 23 September 1520 (aged 48); Bologna, Republic of Florence
- Venerated in: Roman Catholic Church
- Beatified: 26 March 1828, Saint Peter's Basilica, Papal States by Pope Leo XII
- Feast: 23 September

Elena Duglioli (1472 – 23 September 1520) was an Italian Roman Catholic aristocrat from Bologna noted for her devotion to Christian life and social teachings. Duglioli wanted to become a nun for the Poor Clares but instead married in order to please her parents. She is best known for her devotion to Saint Cecilia and for commissioning the painting The Ecstasy of Saint Cecilia for a chapel at San Giovanni in Monte in Bologna.

Her beatification received confirmation from Pope Leo XII on 26 March 1828 after the approval of her local 'cultus' (or popular devotion). Cardinal Prospero Lorenzo Lambertini - the future Pope Benedict XIV - spoke for her beatification cause while it was in its initial stages and included the example of her cultus as part of his work "De Servorum Dei Beatificatione et Beatorum Canonizatione".

== Life ==
Elena Duglioli was born in Bologna in 1472 to the aristocrats Silverio Duglioli and Pentisilea Boccaferri.

In her childhood and adolescence she desired to become a professed religious and decided to enroll at the Poor Clare convent of Corpus Domini, Bologna but decided instead to please her parents and enter into marriage to the much older Benedetto dall'Olio in 1487. Duglioli remained married to her husband for a total of three decades before he died and left her widowed. She was a close friend of Antonio Pucci who was the nephew of Cardinal Lorenzo Pucci. Personalities such as Pope Julius II and Pope Leo X learned of Duglioli and drew from her wisdom and insight despite never having met her.

Duglioli harbored a particular devotion to Saint Cecilia and the papal legate to Bologna - Cardinal Francesco Alidosi - gave her a knucklebone relic of Cecilia to keep. In her marriage she had struggled to live the chaste life in emulation of the saint but managed to persuade her husband not to consummate their marriage in order to achieve this. Her devotion to the saint led to her commissioning a chapel that would see Raphael paint an image of the saint in that chapel.

Duglioli died on 23 September 1520. Her incorrupt remains are housed in the church of San Giovanni in Monte.

== Beatification ==
The beatification for Duglioli received official confirmation on 26 March 1828 once Pope Leo XII approved her local 'cultus' - or popular devotion. Prospero Lorenzo Lambertini - the future Pope Benedict XIV - spoke in favor of Duglioli's beatification was in its initial stages and as pontiff mentioned her in his "De Servorum Dei Beatificatione et Beatorum Canonizatione" as an example of a spontaneous and popular cultus.

== See also ==
- Catholic Church in Italy
- Chronological list of saints and blesseds
- List of beatified people
