= Elisa Angela Meneguzzi =

Italian religious (1901–1941)

Blessed Elisa Angela Meneguzzi
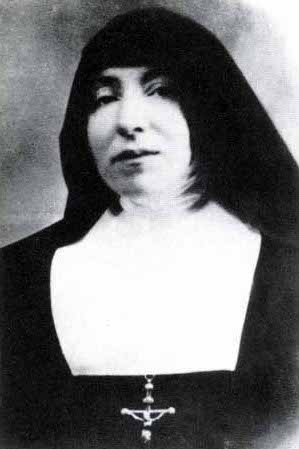

Religious
- Born: 12 July 1901; Abano Terme, Padua, Kingdom of Italy
- Died: 2 December 1941 (aged 40); Dire Dawa, Ethiopia
- Venerated in: Roman Catholic Church
- Beatified: 20 October 2002, Saint Peter's Square, Vatican City by Pope John Paul II
- Feast: 1 December (Padua); 2 December
- Attributes: Religious habit
- Patronage: Dire Dawa; Missionaries; Nurses

Elisa Angela Meneguzzi (12 September 1901 - 2 December 1941) was an Italian Roman Catholic professed religious and a member of the Sisters of Saint Francis de Sales. She assumed the religious name of "Liduina" upon making her solemn profession into the order. She also served in the missions in Ethiopia where she became known for her care of the ill and for her efforts at increased ecumenism; this earned her two titles: "Sister Gudda" (meaning 'Great') and the "Ecumenical Flame".

The beatification was held in Saint Peter's Square on 20 October 2002.

== Life ==
Elisa Angela Meneguzzi was born on 12 September 1901 in Padua to poor farmers and lived on the farm with her brothers and sisters.

Her childhood was noted for her consideration of the religious life as well as her flair for instructing others in catechism and attending Mass on a frequent basis. At the age of fourteen - in 1915 - she began to work as a servant to families of considerable wealth in the area and also worked in the hotels around the hot springs near the town.

On 5 March 1926 she joined the Sisters of Saint Francis de Sales - dedicated to the saint of that name - and upon her solemn profession assumed the religious name of "Liduina". She worked at this time at the Santa Croce boarding school as both a housekeeper and sacristan in addition to her post as that of a nurse.

In 1937 she was granted her ardent desire to join the missions in Ethiopia and was sent to Dire Dawa. She later became known as "Sister Gudda" (meaning 'Great') for her passionate commitment to the needs of the ill and the poor of the town while working as a nurse at Parini Civil Hospital; the outset of World War II saw her tend to wounded soldiers. When the town was bombed she went about moving the wounded to shelters and baptizing those who had fatal injuries.

She became known as the "Ecumenical Fire" due to her strong efforts at ecumenism with Coptic Christians and Muslims while also catering to the latter two and their relations with the Catholics of Dire Dawa.

She acts as a nurse in the Parini Civil Hospital which, after the outbreak of the Second World War, becomes a military hospital. Liduina is a true "charity angel" to the injured soldiers who arrive at the hospital. She nurses their physical aches with tenderness and tireless devotion. She sees in every suffering brother the image of Christ.Soon her name is known by everybody and everyone looks for her and invokes her as a blessing.Natives call her "Sister Gudda" (Great). When the bombings raged on the city and on the hospital, only a cry comes out from everybody' s mouth "Help, Sister Liduina!". And she, careless of the risks, carries the wounded to the shelters and she immediately runs to help others. She bends over the dying to suggest an act of contrition and with her inseparable ampoule of holy water she baptizes the dying children. Her gift is not only for the Italians, the Christians but also for whites and blacks, for Catholics and Coptics, for Muslims and Pagans. Behaving like that, she follows her true ecumenical spirit. She especially loves to speak about the goodness of Father God and about the beautiful heaven which God has prepared for all of us, his sons. The Christian magazine

Meneguzzi died on 2 December 1941 due to cancer. Because of the insistence of soldiers helped by her, she was buried in Dire Dawa where fellow soldiers were buried. Her remains were later moved to the motherhouse of the congregation she served in Padua in July 1961. The doctor who tended to her before her death said: "I've never seen someone dying with such joy and bliss".

== Beatification ==
The beatification process commenced in the Diocese of Padua - and not in Ethiopia - in an informative process that commenced on 21 January 1963 in order to collect evidence and testimonies that could attest to the saintliness of Meneguzzi. The process later closed on 18 June 1965 while all findings from the process were enclosed in large boxes and sent to Rome for assessment. Theologians voiced their approval on 1 June 1968 that all of Meneguzzi's writings were orthodox in nature and did not contradict the faith. An apostolic process was also held as a mere extension of the previous one.

The formal introduction of the cause - under Pope Paul VI - granted Meneguzzi the formal title of Servant of God: the first official stage in the process.

On 3 December 1982 the Congregation for the Causes of Saints validated the previous two processes in what would allow for the so-called "Roman Phase" to commence in which the C.C.S. could begin their own assessment of the cause. It also enabled for the C.C.S. to receive the Positio of Meneguzzi's life and saintliness in 1990.

On 25 June 1996 she was proclaimed to be Venerable after Pope John Paul II acknowledged the fact that the late religious had lived a model life of heroic virtue.

The process for a miracle needed for her beatification took place in the diocese of its origin and received C.C.S. validation on 8 April 1994 in Rome. The pope approved the healing to be a credible miracle in 2002 and beatified her in Saint Peter's Square on 20 October 2002. The miracle in question was the 1977 cure of a man who received grave injuries following a motor vehicle accident.

The current postulator assigned to the cause is Dr. Andrea Ambrosi.

== See also ==
- Catholic Church in Italy
- Chronological list of saints and blesseds
- List of beatified people
