= Passi de Preposulo =

Italian noble family

House of Passi de Preposulo
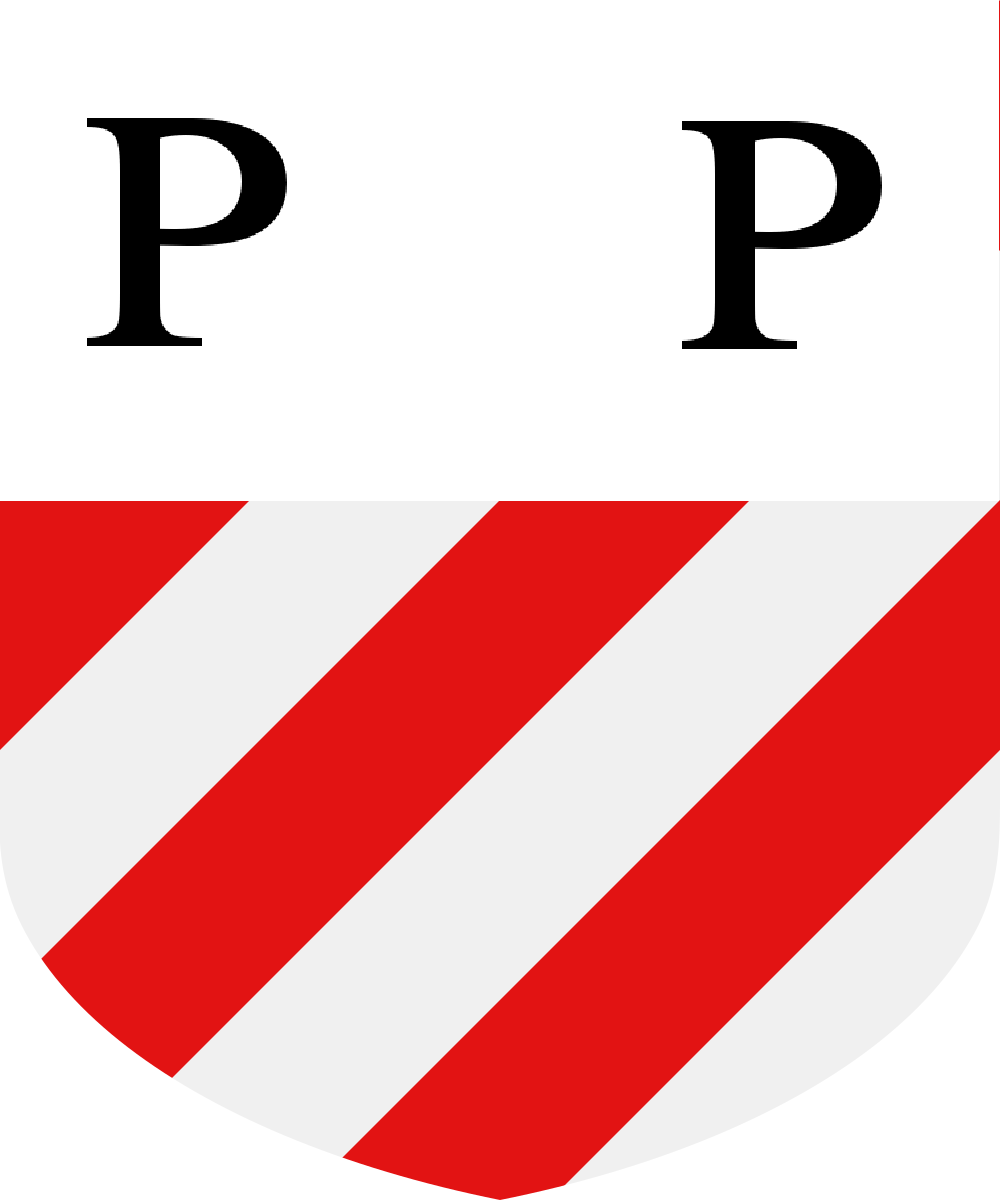
- Country: Italy Former countries: Republic of Venice; Kingdom of Italy
- Founded: 10th century
- Founder: Henricus de Preposulo
- Current head: Alberto Passi de Preposulo
- Titles: Count Passi de Preposulo; Noble of Bergamo
- Motto: Vince et conosce te ipsum

The Passi de Preposulo family is an ancient Italian noble family originally from Bergamo, Lombardy.

== History ==
The first documented history dates back to 973.

The early surname of this noble Bergamo family was “de Preposulo”. It has remained until now in the coat of arms of the Counts Passi de Preposulo in abbreviated form, and was in use, especially in Latin, until the eighteenth century.

They began to be called "Passi" when, in 1307, Ottopasso de Preposulo helped negotiate the peace between the Guelphs and Ghibellines in Bergamo. Since then they have been called "quelli de la pas" from which “the Pas” and then “the Passi”.

The first mention dates back to a Henricus de Preposulo, filius quondam Petri Federici, Sacri Palatii judicis (Archive of the Cathedral of Bergamo).

They distinguished themselves as magistrates, in arms, in letters and, in particular, in the ecclesiastical field.

The family was admitted in 1743 to the Council of the Nobility of Bergamo and acquired the comital title.

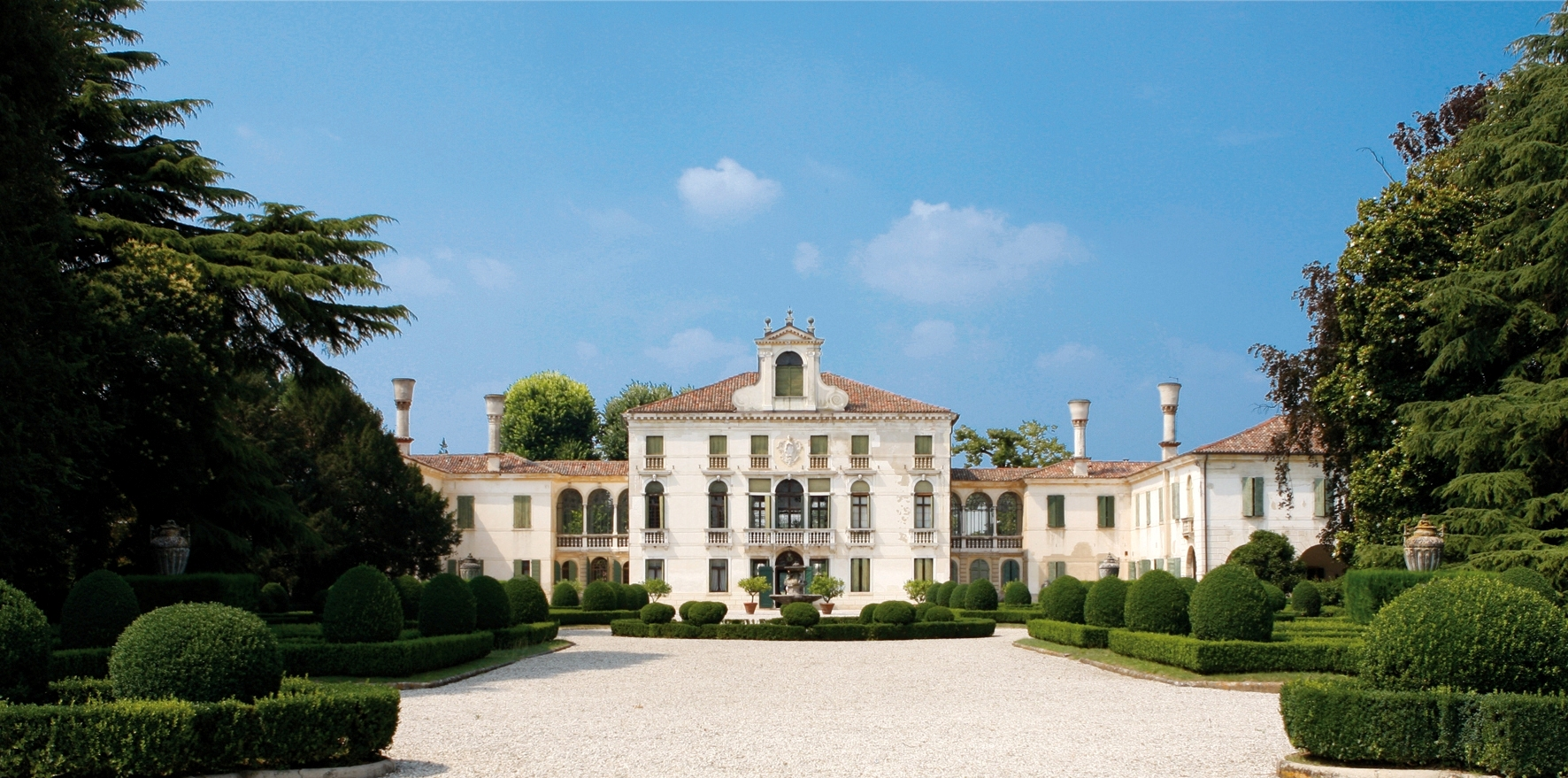
Villa Tiepolo-Passi

One of the properties of the family, acquired in the first half of the eighteenth century, is the Villa Tiepolo-Passi in Carbonera, Veneto. The Hollywood actress Jessica Chastain was married in June 2017 to a current member of the family, Gian Luca Passi de Preposulo.

== Family ==
Marco Celio Passi, di Fermo, di Enrico and di Luca, count, knight and noble, doctor of law, (1828–1897), son of Fermo and of noblewoman Elisabetta Zineroni. He married, firstly, Giulia of the Counts Valier, patrician of Venice, and secondly, Carolina of the Counts Passi, with whom he had:

- Count Alessandro Fermo (1860–1903), married Giuseppina of the Counts Mozzi, from which:
  - Ippolita (1884–1975), married a lawyer, Plinio Donatelli;
  - Giulia (1886–1971), married the Marquis Francesco Tacoli;
  - Marco Celio (1888–1890);
  - Modesta (1889–1967);
  - Maria Luisa (born 1891), married three times sequentially to: Marquis Filippo Tacoli; Captain Carlo Cavalli; noble Leone Tiberelli;
  - Benedetta (born 1893)
  - Angelina (1895–1977), married the General Giacomo Papi;
  - Livia (1897–1982).
- Count Arduisio Enrico Matteo, doctor of law, Italian official, (1862–1945), married Maria dei conti Mappelli-Mozzi, (1865–1943; a sister of Paolo Mapelli Mozzi, a twice great-grandfather of Edoardo Mapelli Mozzi), with issue:
  - Carolina (1887–1968), wed Giovanni Striscia Fioretti;
  - Count Alessandro Fermo, doctor, engineer, cavalry officer, (born 1890), married Maria Anna of the Barons De Zigno, with whom he had:
    - Count Gian Luca, doctor, engineer, with issue:
      - Maria Alessandra (born 1945), marries Dr. Paolo Bauce;
      - Giovanna (born 1947) married Dr. Pasquale Manzi;
      - Count Alberto (born 1949), married Barbara Bruni, with whom he had:
        - Count Gian Luca (born 1982), married American actress and film producer Jessica Chastain, with whom he has two children:
          - Giulietta (born 2018).
          - Count Augustus (born 2020).
        - Gaia (born 1985), married Federico Iannello
      - Count Cesare (born 1950), married firstly ... Lozano, with whom he had issue, and secondly with Donna Maria Belén Ruspoli dei Principi Ruspoli daughter of Luis Ruspoli, 7th Marquis of Boadilla del Monte, with whom he had three children:
        - Lucia (born 1987);
        - Maria (born 1988);
        - Count Alejandro (born 1998);
        - Carmen (born 2003);
        - Count Luca (born 2006).
      - Francesca (born 1953), married Alberto Franchini.
    - Emma (born 1920), married Baron Roberto Ciani Bassetti.
    - Count Achille (born 1924), doctor of chemistry, married, with issue:
      - Count Alessandro (born 1951) doctor of letters, married Lynn Maria Pitcher, with whom he had:
        - Count Federico Achille (born 1981).
    - Maria Antonia (born 1927) married Dr. Carlo Perissinotti Bisoni;
    - Count Enrico Matteo, doctor of agricultural sciences (born 1931), married 1965, Donna Caterina Corsini of the Princes of Sismano.
      - Ludovica (born 1966), married Lorenzo Villoresi [Alessandro (1998), Arturo (2000), Gemma (2005)].
      - Maddalena (born 1970), married Marco Pinciroli [Giovanna (2000), Francesca (2002), Giacomo (2003)].

== Notable members ==
- Luca Passi
- Marco Celio, Conte di Preposulo
