= The Ecstasy of Saint Cecilia =

Painting by Raphael

Saint Cecilia Altarpiece
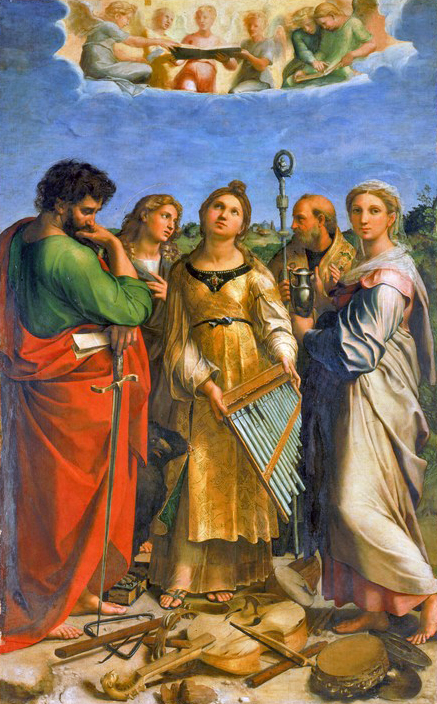
- Artist: Raphael
- Year: c. 1514–1517
- Type: Oil transferred from panel to canvas
- Dimensions: 220 cm × 136 cm (87 in × 54 in)
- Location: Pinacoteca Nazionale, Bologna

The Saint Cecilia Altarpiece is an oil painting by the Italian High Renaissance master Raphael. Completed in his later years, in around 1516–1517, the painting depicts Saint Cecilia, the patron saint of musicians and Church music, listening to a choir of angels in the company of Saints Paul, John the Evangelist, Augustine and Mary Magdalene. Commissioned for a church in Bologna, the painting now hangs in that city's Pinacoteca Nazionale. According to Giorgio Vasari the musical instruments strewn about Cecilia's feet were not painted by Raphael but by his student, Giovanni da Udine.

The English Romantic poet Percy Bysshe Shelley described the painting as follows:

The central figure, St. Cecilia, seems rapt in such inspiration as produced her image in the painter's mind; her deep, dark, eloquent eyes lifted up; her chestnut hair flung back from her forehead—she holds an organ in her hands—her countenance, as it were, calmed by the depth of its passion and rapture, and penetrated throughout with the warm and radiant light of life. She is listening to the music of heaven, and, as I imagine, has just ceased to sing, for the four figures that surround her evidently point, by their attitudes, towards her; particularly St. John, who, with a tender yet impassioned gesture, bends his countenance towards her, languid with the depth of emotion. At her feet lie various instruments of music, broken and unstrung.

== History ==
The altarpiece was commissioned for a chapel dedicated to Saint Cecilia in the Augustinian church of San Giovanni in Monte in Bologna. According to Vasari the work was commissioned by Cardinal Lorenzo Pucci in 1513. Given the extraordinary popularity of the painter at this time in his career, it is likely that only such a highly placed church authority could have had any hope of hiring him. The patron of the chapel itself, however, was Elena Duglioli dall'Olio, an aristocratic Bolognese woman who would later be beatified for her piety. She was a close friend of Antonio Pucci, Cardinal Lorenzo's nephew, and most art historians today agree that the Pucci must have served as her agents and advisers with Raphael and that the painting was more likely commissioned for her around 1516, when construction on the chapel was completed. Duglioli had a particular devotion to the cult of Saint Cecilia and had been given a relic of the saint (her knucklebone) by the papal legate to Bologna, Cardinal Francesco Alidosi. She struggled to live a chaste life in emulation of the saint and persuaded her husband not to consummate their marriage.

The painting was looted to Paris in 1798. While there, it was transferred to canvas. In 1815, the painting was returned to Bologna where, after cleaning, it was hung in the Pinacoteca Nazionale di Bologna. The painting's condition is poor, as it has been damaged by repainting over the years.

== Iconography ==
Saint Cecilia's companions are identified in part by their attributes. Immediately to her left, John the Evangelist has an eagle, his usual symbol, peeking out around his robes. Beside him, Paul leans on the sword with which he had come to be identified in medieval art. Saint Augustine holds his crosier. Mary Magdalene holds the alabaster jar by which she is most commonly identified.

The iconography of the altarpiece is unusual in that rather than portraying a figure or figures to be worshipped, it represents the act of worship itself. Each of the saints was associated with visions—as was Elena Duglioni herself—and the celestial choir that opens above the saints' heads is closely associated with the patron's own devotions, in which music was an important element. Cecilia was associated with music from the Middle Ages, but the broken instruments here appear to refer to the abandonment of earthly pleasures that resulted from Cecilia's devotion to the sacred. In this painting she personifies religious music as a route to union with God.

The painting further celebrates the theme of chastity. Saint Cecilia's simple belt is a traditional Renaissance symbol for chastity; John the Evangelist was the patron saint of virginity; and Paul praised celibacy in I Corinthians. Thus the painting's iconography is closely tied to the life of the patron on many levels.

There is an engraving of the painting by Marcantonio Raimondi: it differs significantly from the work, and some scholars have suggested that it reflects a lost sketch for the altarpiece. In it Raphael depicted the angels with instruments as well—harp, triangle and violin—and the figures are in very different poses. Saints Augustine (wearing his mitre) and Paul look downward; John looks out towards the viewer; the Magdalene looks upward to the angelic host, as Cecilia does. Raimondi's engravings are frequently known to alter Raphael's works, however, so it is not impossible that it represents a free variant of the finished altarpiece rather than a copy of a sketch of Raphael's initial intentions.

== See also ==
- List of paintings by Raphael

== Bibliography ==
- Bolton, Sarah Knowles (1890). Famous European artists. T. Y. Crowell & co. p. 144.
- Champlin, John Denison; Charles Callahan Perkins (1913). Cyclopedia of painters and paintings. Scribner's. p. 262.
- D'Anvers, N. (1882). Raphael. Sampson Low, Marston, Searle, & Rivington. p. 59.
- Gardner, Lawrence (31 March 2007). The Magadalene Legacy: The Jesus and Mary Bloodline Conspiracy. Weiser. ISBN 978-1-57863-403-3.
- Lowrie, Walter (March 2007). Art in the Early Church. READ BOOKS. ISBN 978-1-4067-5291-5.
- Müntz, Eugène (1882). Raphael; his life, works and times. Chapman and Hall, limited. p. 529.
- Nici, John (1 January 2008). Barron's AP Art History. Barron's Educational Series. p. 155. ISBN 978-0-7641-3737-2.
- Scott, Leader (1883). The renaissance of art in Italy: an illustrated history. Scribner and Welford.
- Singleton, Esther (14 November 2008) [1899]. "St. Cecilia". Great Pictures: As Seen and Described by Famous Writers. Dodo Press. pp. 287–288. ISBN 978-1-4099-4570-3.
- Vasari, Giorgio; George Bull (1987). Lives of the artists. Vol. 1. Penguin Classics. ISBN 978-0-14-044500-8.
