= Annunciata Astoria Cocchetti =

Italian nun

Blessed Annunciata Astoria Cocchetti
- Born: 9 May 1800; Rovato, Brescia, Cisalpine Republic
- Died: 23 March 1882 (aged 81); Cemmo di Capo di Ponte, Brescia, Kingdom of Italy
- Venerated in: Roman Catholic Church
- Beatified: 21 April 1991, Saint Peter's Basilica, Vatican City by Pope John Paul II
- Feast: 23 March
- Attributes: Religious habit
- Patronage: Suore di Santa Dorotea di Cemmo, educators

Annunciata Astoria Cocchetti (9 May 1800 – 23 March 1882) was an Italian religious sister and the founder of the Suore di Santa Dorotea di Cemmo, a congregation dedicated to the educational needs of the poor in Brescia and the surrounding cities. Cocchetti made her vows in 1843 and was close with Luca Passi who established a congregation similar to hers.

Cocchetti was beatified in Saint Peter's Basilica by Pope John Paul II on 21 April 1991. She is the patroness of the Suore di Santa Dorotea and of educators.

== Life ==
Annunciata Astoria Cocchetti was born in Brescia on 9 May 1800 as the third of six children to Marcantonio Cocchetti and Giulia Albarelli; two siblings were Vincenzo and Giuseppina.

In 1807, she was orphaned at the age of seven and was taken to live with her grandmother. Her uncle Carlo from Milan decided to take both Giuseppina and Vincenzo to live with him while Cocchetti was sent to her grandmother's. She received her First Communion and her Confirmation - on 28 February 1810 - from the Bishop of Brescia, Gabrio Maria Nava. In 1817, at the age of seventeen, Cocchetti used her grandmother's home as a school for poor girls. She received her education at Rovato and in 1822 moved her studies to Cemmo Valcamonica. Her grandmother died on 19 April 1823 which prompted her to leave her home and move in with her uncle in Milan. She resided there until 1829. During this time she came into contact with Luca Passi who was in the process of establishing a new religious congregation and remained in touch with him until his death in 1866. Cocchetti learned of a school in Brescia devoted to female education and decided to join it; one evening in 1831 she decided not to attend a gala evening with Carlo at the Teatro alla Scala and instead left a letter on his desk and travelled to Cemmo Valmonica.

In 1821 Erminia Panzerini (d. 2 May 1842) opened in Brescia a school for girls and entrusted it to the direction of Cocchetti in 1831; it was in 1831 she accepted a teaching position from Panzerini at this school with the encouragement of her spiritual director. She realized in this place that her true purpose in life was to the education of the poor. At this point Passi wanted the two women to join the congregation founded by him and aggregate the school to it, but this was hindered due to Panzerini's 1842 death. She travelled to Venice in 1842 to establish a congregation - all the more since Passi was there - and returned in October with two aspirants; the three made their solemn profession into Cocchetti's new congregation in 1843. From this school she formed a new religious congregation - the Suore di Santa Dorotea di Cemmo - and established it on 9 October 1842 after being vested on the previous 3 October. The institute later received the diocesan approval - on 5 February 1855 - of the Bishop of Brescia Giacomo Maria Corna Pellegrini. The congregation promoted the Spiritual Exercises of Ignatius of Loyola as an appropriate focus for retreats.

On the morning of 18 March 1882 she went to Mass but felt ill after receiving the Eucharist. She was diagnosed with a fever as well as disease ravaging her. She received the Last Rites and the Viaticum not long after this. Cocchetti died on 23 March 1882 and her remains were relocated on 22 January 1951. The congregation received the papal decree of praise of Pope Pius XI on 20 March 1934 and received the formal papal approval of Pope Pius XII on 10 May 1941. The congregation now works in numerous nations such as Argentina and Uganda. As of 2005 there were 336 religious sisters in a total of 59 houses.

== Beatification ==
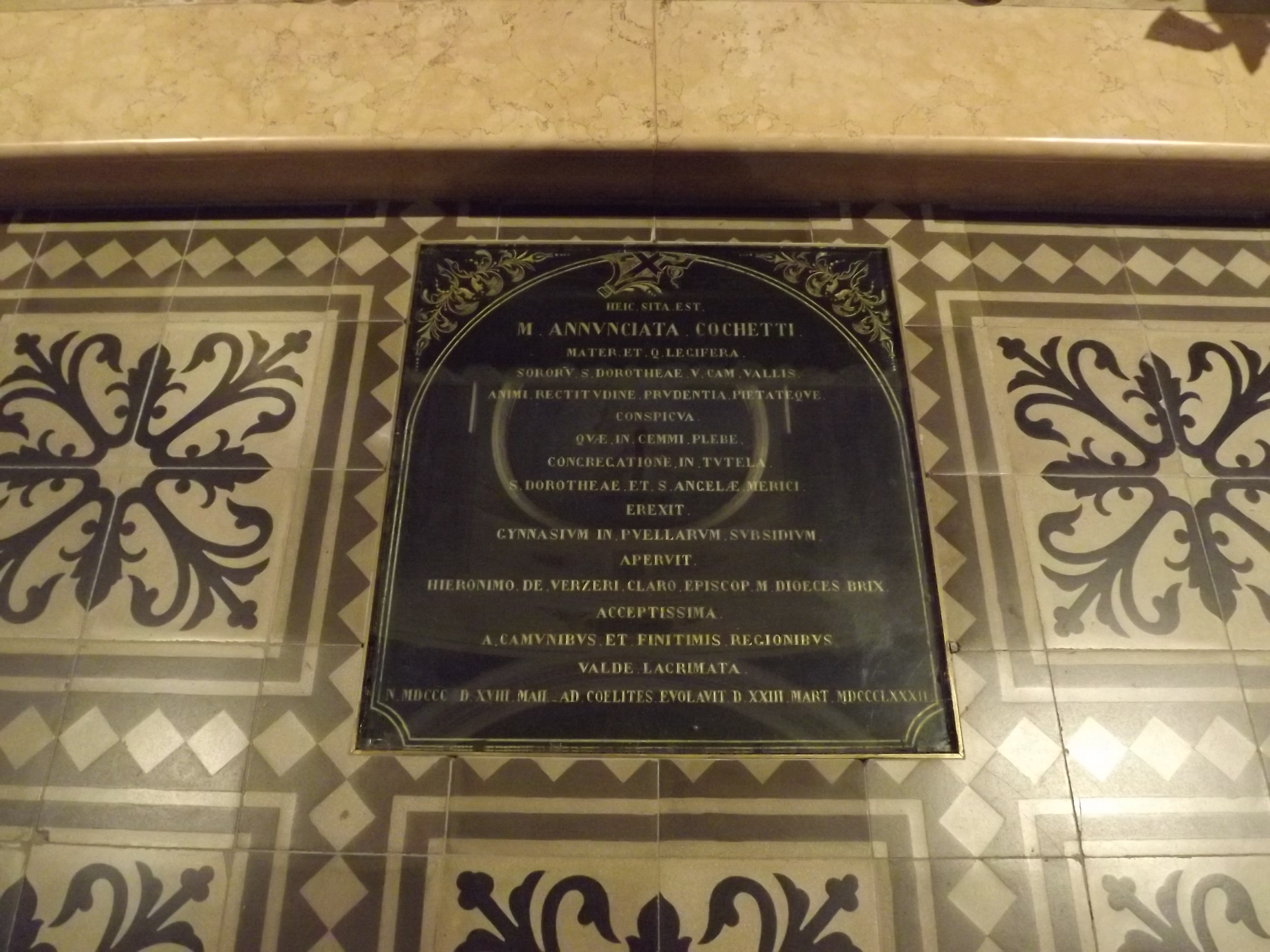
Tomb of Blessed Annunciata Coccheti, in the Mother house of the congregation in Cemmo

A miracle involved the cure of Bortolina Milesi - aged thirteen - who had severe bowel complications that could have proven fatal had it not been for the intercession of Cocchetti. The process for investigating the miracle took place in 1952 and concluded in 1953.
