= Luigi Caburlotto =

Italian priest

Blessed Luigi Caburlotto
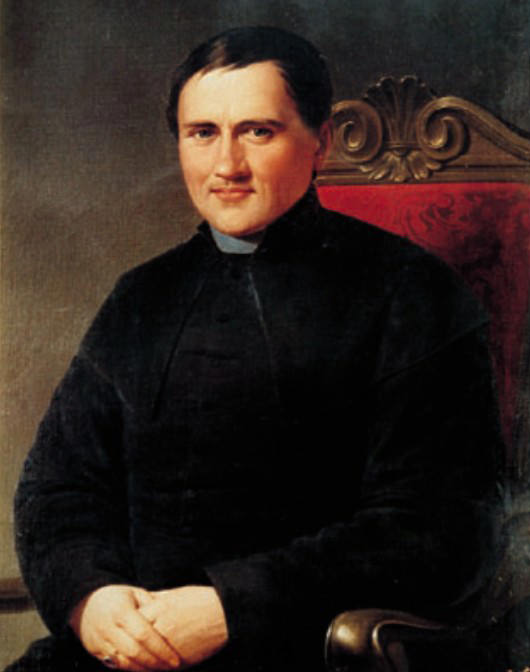
- Born: 7 June 1817; Venice, Kingdom of Lombardy–Venetia
- Died: 9 July 1897 (aged 80); Venice, Kingdom of Italy
- Venerated in: Roman Catholic Church
- Beatified: 16 May 2015, Venice, Italy by Cardinal Angelo Amato
- Feast: 9 July
- Attributes: Priest's cassock; Zucchetto
- Patronage: Daughters of Saint Joseph

Luigi Caburlotto (7 June 1817 – 9 July 1897) was an Italian priest and was the founder of the Daughters of Saint Joseph.

Caburlotto was cleared for beatification in 2014 after a miracle was found to have been attributed to his intercession and he was beatified on 16 May 2015 in Venice by Cardinal Angelo Amato on behalf of Pope Francis.

== Biography ==
Luigi Caburlotto was born in Venice in 1817 as the son of a Venetian gondolier. Caburlotto entered the seminary in Venice and was ordained to the priesthood on 24 September 1842. Caburlotto worked with young people who were either abandoned or homeless and spent six years of intense pastoral work. He made it his job to study the social situation of the population, and placed emphasis on the youth. On 30 April 1850, he established a school for poor and abandoned girls. Thus, the Daughters of Saint Joseph was founded.

Caburlotto placed importance on the catechetical formation of the people and stressed the importance of the frequent reception of the sacraments.

His work continued in 1857 when he founded a home for poor girls and in 1859, a complex for the poor. He also established a free college and in 1869, was assigned to revive the Manin Institute which served as a trade school for men. By 1881, he had taken over poor schools and revived them with staff and resources.

But by this time, he remained at his home parish due to failing health, where he conducted retreats for the clergy and the laity. Caburlotto spent his final years away from his institutions and he lived a quiet and private life. He continued to keep track of all his institutions, for they were very close to him, but he could not go to visit them due to his failing health.

Luigi Caburlotto died in 1897 with the Patriarch of Venice Cardinal Giuseppe Melchiorre Sarto - future Pope Pius X - at his bedside. His remains were moved on 1 March 2009 to the parish of Saint Sebastian.

== Beatification ==
The cause of beatification for Caburlotto commenced at a diocesan level on 14 September 1963 which finalized its work on 28 June 1969. Pope John Paul II recognized his life of heroic virtue and named him to be Venerable on 2 July 1994.

A miracle attributed to his intercession was investigated from 22 December 2009 to 28 September 2010; the investigation was validated in 2012. It first went to a medical board in 2013 and went to theologians before proceeding to the Congregation for the Causes of Saints for approval both in 2014.

Pope Francis recognized a miracle attributed to his intercession on 9 May 2014 and his beatification was celebrated on 16 May 2015 in Venice. Cardinal Angelo Amato - on behalf of the pope - presided over the beatification.
