= Tommaso da Olera =

Italian Capuchin and Blessed

Blessed Tommaso da Olera OFMCap
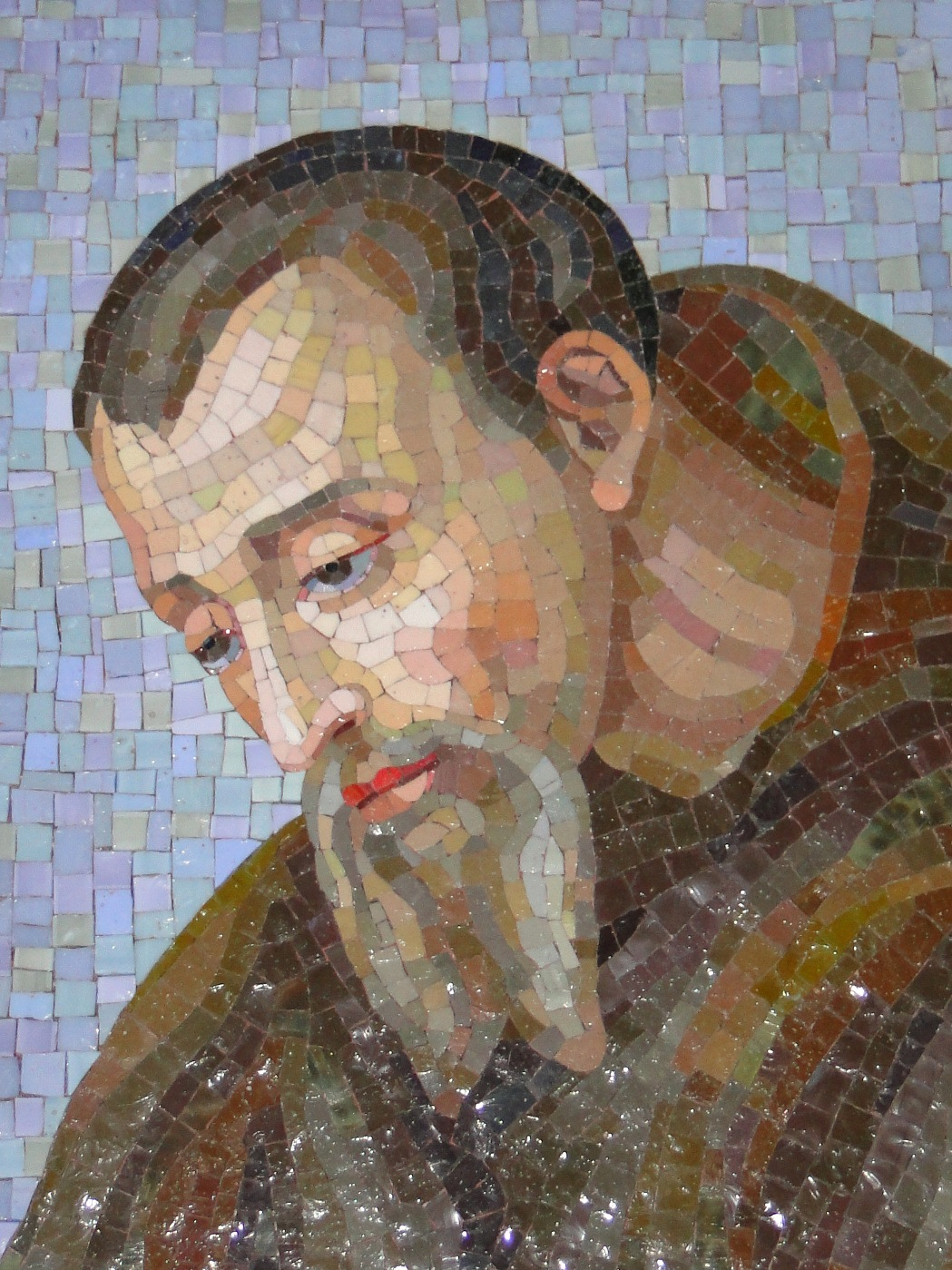
- Mosaic in Olera
- Born: Tommaso Acerbis; 1563; Olera, Bergamo, Duchy of Milan
- Died: 3 May 1631; Innsbruck, Tyrol, Austria
- Venerated in: Roman Catholic Church
- Beatified: 21 September 2013, Bergamo, Italy by Cardinal Angelo Amato
- Feast: 3 May
- Attributes: Capuchin habit

Tommaso da Olera (1563 - 3 May 1631) - born Tommaso Acerbis - was a Roman Catholic Italian friar of the Capuchins. Acerbis lived as a Franciscan beggar and as a religious who provided spiritual advice and consolation to a number of people that included Leopold V and his wife.

He was beatified in Bergamo on 21 September 2013 in which Cardinal Angelo Amato presided on the behalf of Pope Francis.

== Biography ==
=== Early life and achievement ===
Tommaso Acerbis was born in 1563 to poor parents and he worked as a shepherd as a child without ever having received proper schooling.

He joined the Order of Friars Minor Capuchin on 12 September 1580 in Verona at the convent of Santa Croce di Cittadella where at the age of seventeen he learnt how to read and write. He made his solemn profession on 5 July 1584 and served in the convents in Verona (1605–12) and Vicenza (1612-17) as well as Rovereto (1617–18). He was later sent to Padua in 1618 as the convent's porter, while not long after in 1619 he was sent to a new province of the order in Austria at the request of the archduke Leopold V.

Out of those convents he visited the sick people and also helped the poor. He often encouraged and championed a love of the faith to those who listened to him. When Lutheranism began to take root in the area he spoke out and also wrote in defense of the Roman Catholic Church. He chose not to confront but to instead speak on his love of "the impassioned Christ" and the church that He founded. In Vicenza he had sponsored the opening of a convent for the Poor Clares which from 1612-3 was built at Porta Nuova. At Rovereto he sought permission from city authorities to make another convent for the Poor Clares which was built in 1642 and it was there that he met and spiritually guided Bernardina Floriani while in 1617 became a friend and the spiritual director of the scientist Ippolito Guarinoni. He was also a spiritual guide to the archduke and his wife Claudia de' Medici and Acerbis frequently met and corresponded with the two.

=== Death ===
He died in mid-1631 in Innsbruck. His remains are housed in Innsbruck.

=== Papal veneration ===
Pope John XXIII was noted for having enjoyed the writings of the late Franciscan and even said that he was "a saint and a true master of the spirit". The pontiff received a gift from Doctor Joseph Mitterstiller from Innsbruck on 24 November 1959 which was a book of the spiritual writings of the late friar, and the pope's private secretary Loris Francesco Capovilla later wrote of the occasion and said that the pope had "declared his great esteem and veneration" for him. Capovilla later wrote that on 20 May 1963 the dying pope asked that Capovilla, the pope's nurse, Fra Federico Bellotti and the two helpers Guido and Giampaolo Gusso read for him on his deathbed the late friar's works amongst others. Pope Paul VI also spoke of his esteem for Acerbis.

== Beatification ==
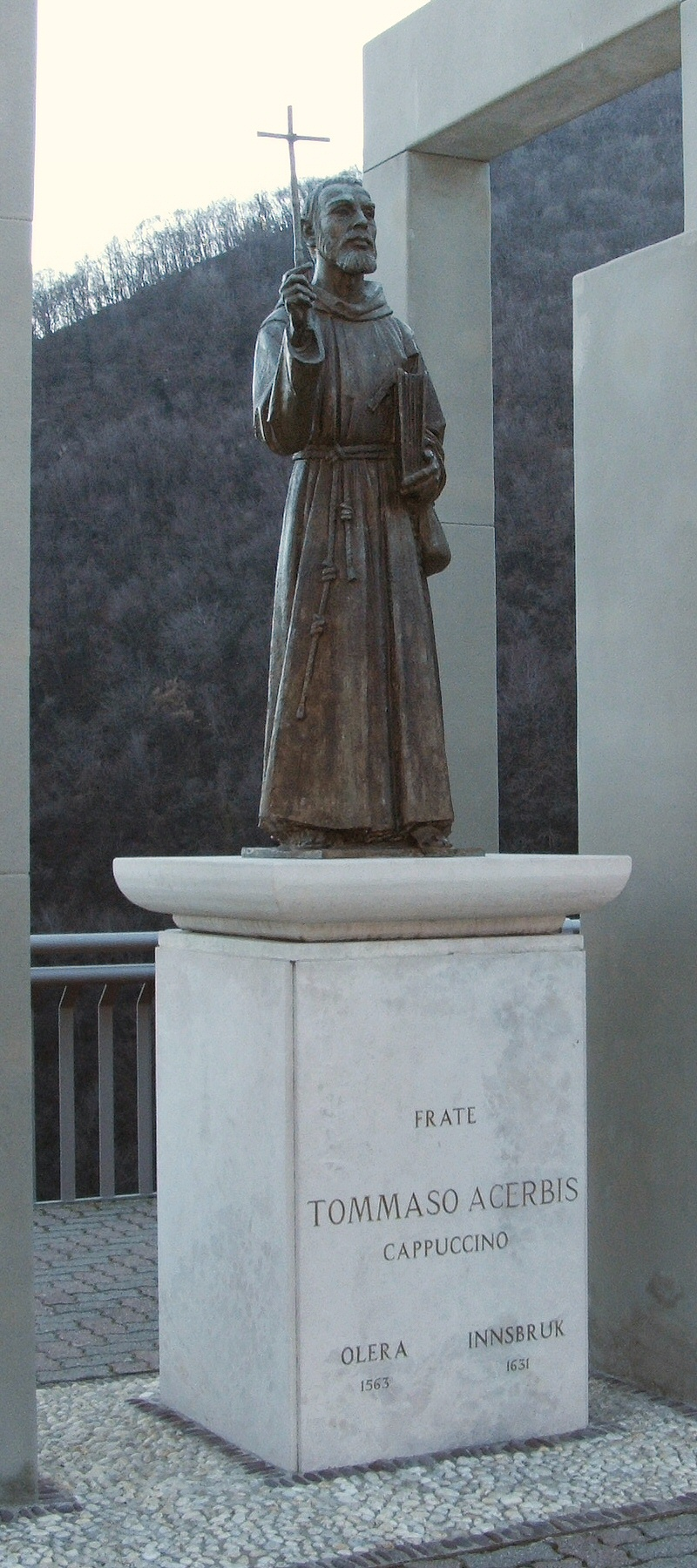
Statue in Olera.

The stages of the beatification process commenced on 28 February 1967 in an informative process that concluded its work on 19 April 1968 with the Positio dossier later submitted to Rome in March 1978. This occurred despite the fact that the formal introduction of the cause was not granted until 4 December 1980 with the declaration of "nihil obstat" (nothing against). Theologians approved all his spiritual writings on 12 February 1974 while historians also approved the course of the cause and deemed no historical obstacles existed - on 7 March 1979. The diocesan process was later validated on 28 May 1982 which led to theologians approving the cause on 2 December 1986 and the Congregation for the Causes of Saints following this decision as well on 30 September 1987. He was proclaimed Venerable on 23 October 1987 after Pope John Paul II recognized his life of heroic virtue.

A miracle led to a diocesan tribunal from 26 October 2006 to 4 October 2007 to investigate and later submitted its findings to the C.C.S. who validated the process on 16 January 2009. A medical board issued their approval to it on 24 February 2011 while theologians likewise approved it on 22 October 2011 as did the C.C.S. on 7 February 2012. Pope Benedict XVI issued the final approval needed for it on 10 May 2012 and Cardinal Angelo Amato - on the behalf of Pope Francis - celebrated the beatification mass in Bergamo on 21 September 2013. The postulator assigned to this cause is Fra Carlo Calloni.
