= Lucia Khambang =

Thai Roman Catholic nun (1917 – 1940)

Blessed Lucia Khambang LHC
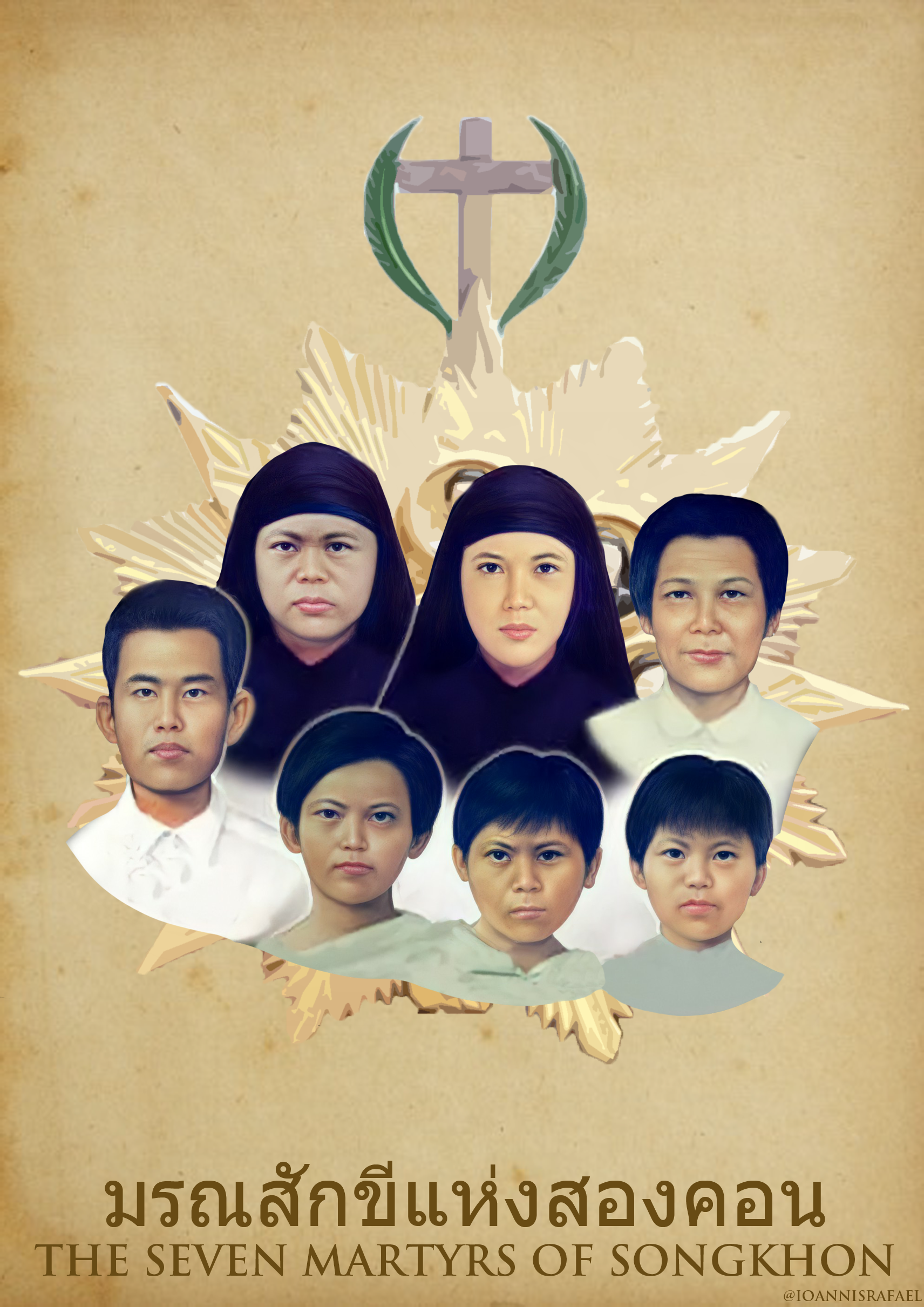
- Born: January 22, 1917
- Died: December 16, 1940 (aged 23)
- Feast: December 16, beatification marked annually on October 22 in Thailand.

Lucia Khambang (1917 – 1940) also referred to as Lucy Khambang, was a Thai Roman Catholic nun and martyr, who was beatified by Pope John Paul II on Mission Sunday, October 22, 1989, during a world tour, along with six other martyrs who with her refused to renounce their faith.

== Early life and vocation ==
She was born in Viengkuk, and entered the Lovers of the Holy Cross in 1931 at age 14.

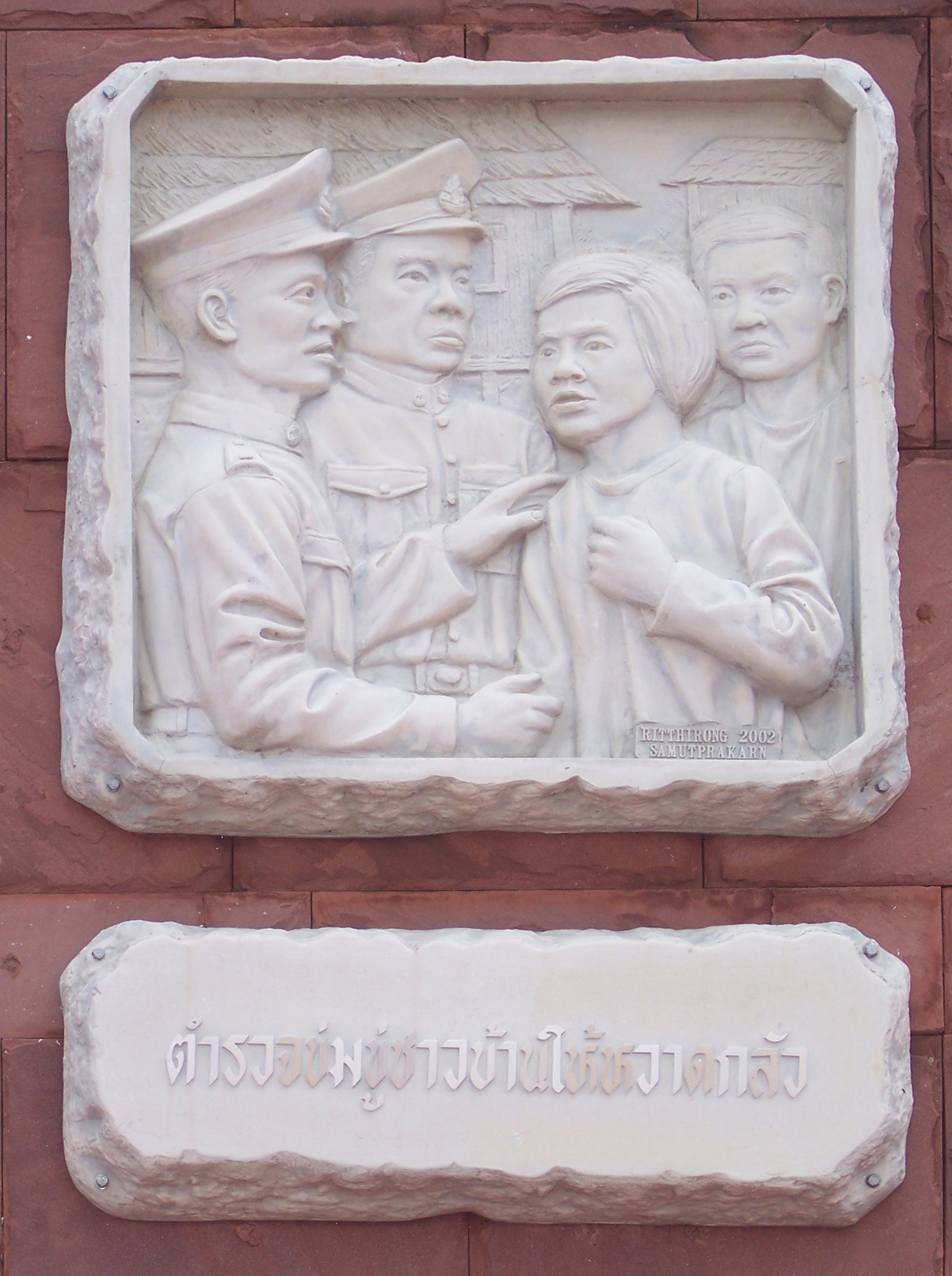
Sr. Agnes Phila on the Shrine of Our Lady of the Martyrs of Thailand

== Martyrdom ==
Her congregation sent her to Songkhon in 1940, to become a teacher. In 1940 the Thai government, normally quite tolerant, began cracking down on Catholicism, which was viewed as French and threateningly colonial under the short rule of ultranationalist and militaristic prime minister Plaek Phibunsongkhram, whose rule historian Shane Strate compared to the fascism of Mussolini. The prime minister's enforcer was Boonlue "Luc" Muangkote, a constable who led groups of police to demand that Catholics convert to Buddhism, and that the nuns dress as normal Thai women. Some say the police accused them of being French spies.

On Christmas morning 1940 a group of Thai police raided the convent of the Lovers of the Holy Cross, interrupting both Khambang and Sister Agnes Phila as they taught catechism. The sisters already knew of the danger because one of the parish lay catechists, 33-year-old Philip Siphong Onphitak, was tortured and shot ten days earlier, on orders of the government and presumably by Boonlue himself. In fact, the sisters were teaching the same group that he could not longer mentor. The police initially marched the two nuns, along with young lay workers (alphabetically) Cecilia Butsi (age 14), Bibiana Khamphai or Hampai (15), Maria Phon (16), and their cook Agatha Phutta (59) toward the Mekong River. However, Sr. Phila asked to be taken to the cemetery instead because she insisted it was a holy place. The sisters and lay women sang hymns as they marched, and in their willingness to stand up for their faith they drew a crowd of well-wishers, who then looked on as the police shot them all. Thus the 23-year-old Khambang became one of the Martyrs of Songkhon. A girl named Soru escaped and was cared for by villagers.

Historian Tuan Hoang connects the Marian devotions of these Vietnamese Catholics to a particular form of anticommunism that allowed them ot stand up to oppression and accept martyrdom. The persecution of Catholics ended in 1944 when prime minister Phibunsongkhram was forced to step down. These were the only martyrs of his tenure.

== In religious culture ==
Khambang is depicted on a tapestry in the Cathedral of Our Lady of the Angels in Los Angeles. The group is portrayed at the Shrine of Our Lady of the Martyrs of Thailand in Mukdahan Province. When Pope Francis visited Thailand in 2019, the issue of the martyrdom was the subject of regret by the Rev. Prayoon Phongphit, chancellor of the archdiocese of the martyrs: “For our history, we should not repeat the bad part but we should use it as a lesson, to move on, to build a new religious history, to bring all Thais together as brothers and sisters." The remains of all seven martyrs were re-interred at a service attended by thousands of Thai people at the Church of the Holy Redeemer. Ascension Catholic Church in West Virginia houses some relics of the martyrs, and relics were part of an exhibition by the Cathedral of the Immaculate Conception in Lake Charles, Louisiana.
