= Emmanuel d'Abreu =

Roman Catholic priest

Blessed Emmanuel d'Abreu

Personal life
- Born: 1708 Arouca, Portugal
- Died: 12 January 1737 (aged 28–29) Tonkin

Religious life
- Religion: Catholic
- Institute: Society of Jesus

Emmanuel d'Abreu SJ was a Roman Catholic priest who joined the Jesuit order in 1724. He was deputed to Goa in 1733 and then in Macau in 1734. In March 1736, he was arrested in the kingdom of Tonkin (today's Vietnam). He was tortured and martyred by beheading for his work in the following year with three of his companions, John Gaspard Cratz, Bartholomew Alvarez and Vincent da Cunha. Their memorial is on 12 January, the date of their execution.
