= Maria Angela Picco =

Italian Roman Catholic nun

Blessed Eugenia Picco
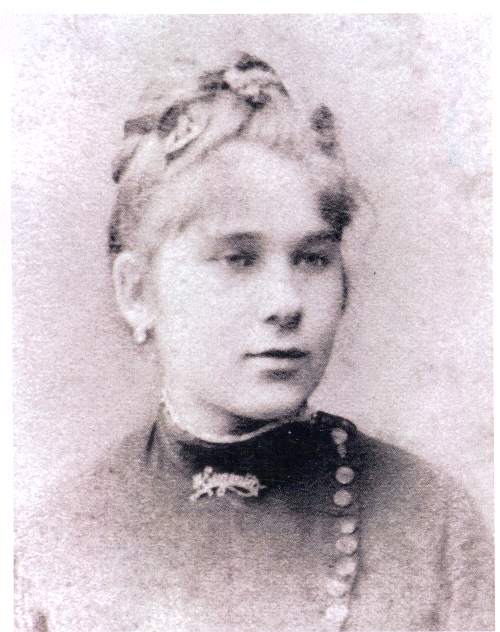

Religious
- Born: 8 November 1867; Crescenzago, Milan, Italy
- Died: 7 September 1921 (aged 53); Parma, Italy
- Venerated in: Roman Catholic Church
- Beatified: 7 October 2001, Saint Peter's Square, Vatican City by Pope John Paul II
- Feast: 7 September
- Attributes: Religious habit

Eugenia Picco (8 November 1867 – 7 September 1921) was an Italian Roman Catholic professed religious of the Little Daughters of the Sacred Hearts of Jesus and Mary. She assumed the new name of "Anna Eugenia" upon making her solemn profession and held various leadership positions until her death. She was known for her intense commitment to the plight of the poor and for her strong devotion to the Eucharist.

She was beatified on 7 October 2001.

== Life ==
Eugenia Picco was born in a Milanese district on 8 November 1867 to Giuseppe Picco (a famous blind touring violinist) and Adelaide del Corno (who cared little for her husband and was a lapsed Christian). Her parents lived place to place which meant that Picco had to spend most of her childhood with her grandparents while seeing her parents on brief instances. At one stage her mother returned home alone so Picco was taken to live with her and began to live in a destitute and corrupt environment. Her mother had returned with a new partner named Basilio Recalcati with whom she had three children with. She lived under the belief her father had died despite the fact it was under suspicious circumstances while he and his wife had been in the United States of America.

Of her time with her mother she recalled the tough times: "Dangers and occasions at home and outside". In order to escape her home she spent her free time at the Church of Saint Ambrose to spend her time focusing on God. One evening in May 1886 she felt called to become a saint and desired the religious life as her true calling. It was at the age of 20 in 1887 that she felt called to the religious life. She fled her home on 31 August 1887 and planned joining a religious congregation. Picco confided her desire to become a religious to the Ursuline Sisters of Milan to be a religious and one of the Ursulines in turn communicated it to Agostino Chieppi. She joined the order in Milan that Chieppi founded after she fled her home and was at once accepted into it. She commenced her novitiate in Parma on 26 August 1888 and made her first profession on 10 June 1891 in the hands of Chieppi. Her solemn profession was made on 1 June 1894.

Picco served as the archivist and novice mistress in the congregation and ascended to the position of Superior General in June 1911. She held the position until her death. In her adult life she suffered a degenerative bone disease that led to her right leg being amputated in 1919. She offered her sufferings up to God for the good of His name.

Picco died in 1921 due to tuberculosis.

== Beatification ==
The beatification process commenced in Parma in September 1945 in an informative process that had been tasked to compile documentation and witness testimonies that could attest to the potential sanctification of Picco. Theologians began the process of evaluating her writings on 24 March 1947, and approved them as being in line with the magisterium of the faith on 6 June 1963. The process was ratified in Rome on 14 March 1986 and allowed for the postulation to submit the Positio to the Congregation for the Causes of Saints in 1987 for further assessment.

On 18 February 1989 she was proclaimed to be Venerable after Pope John Paul II acknowledged that Picco had lived a model life of heroic virtue – both cardinal and theological virtues.

The process for investigating a miracle attributed to her took place in the Democratic Republic of Congo in Uvira. It involved the 25 August 1992 healing of Camillo Talubingi Kingombe. The investigation was ratified on 11 October 1996 and all medical documents were sent to the C.C.S. afterwards. The Rome-based medical board granted assent to the healing on 3 December 1998 while consulting theologians also approved it on 23 March 1999. The C.C.S. followed suit on 1 December 1999 and allowed for John Paul II to voice his approval on the following 20 December.

Picco was beatified on 7 October 2001.
