= Vitus of Hungary =

Blessed Vitus of Hungary, O.S.A.

Confessor of the Faith
- Born: (?) Várad, Kingdom of Hungary (present-day Oradea, Romania)
- Died: 1297; Esztergom
- Venerated in: Roman Catholic Church (Hungary & the Order of Saint Augustine)
- Beatified: c. 1310 (?) by Gentile Portino da Montefiore (?)
- Feast: 3 May

Vitus of Hungary (Latin: Vitus Pannonius or Vitus de Hungaria, Hungarian: Magyarországi Vid; died 1297) was a Hungarian Augustinian friar in the 13th century, who was later beatified.

== Monastic life ==
Contemporary sources have preserved neither his name nor activities. 18th-century historiographical works – Ungaricae sanctitatis indicia and the Bollandists' Acta Sanctorum Ungariae I. – state that Vitus was a member of the Augustinian Hermits. It is possible he was born in Várad (present-day Oradea, Romania), as a 17th-century author Nicolaus Crusenius claimed. According to his legend, Vitus lived in the Augustinian St. Anne monastery of Esztergom. He took an active part in the conversion of the pagan Cumans, after papal legate Philip of Fermo persuaded the Hungarian elite to adopt the so-called Cuman laws in 1279.

A non-authentic royal charter from 1278 refers to a certain frater Vitus, along with Augustinian provincial prior Elijah and abbots Nicholas of Esztergom and James of Mezősomlyó. In the document, Ladislaus IV of Hungary donated a mill to the abbey of Mezősomlyó (present-day Gătaia, Romania). The document narrates that Vitus was present in the Battle on the Marchfeld took place in that year. The fact that he precedes the two abbots in the order of the Augustinians (without any title) in the document indicates his honorable status.

== Beatification ==
Ignatius Brentano Cimarolo's Epitome chronologica mundi christiany (1727) put his death year to 1297. 14th-century theologians Jordan of Quedlinburg and Henry of Friemar already listed Vitus among the most respected Augustinian friars, but without details of his activity. 16th-century historian Joseph Panfilo claimed that Vitus was a holy man whose cult was connected with the resurrection of the dead. 17th-century scholar Johannes Naevius claimed that Vitus protected Pannonia (i.e. Hungary) from the epidemics. According to the 17th-century Jesuit scholar Márton Szentiványi, his feast day was held on 3 May.

An unidentified Florentine chronicler, who compiled his work in 1336, lists his three miracles, which, however, contain valueless hagiographical topoi without any identifiable geographical or historical data. One of them says that 13 years after his death, his grave was excavated, after which the miracle was performed. Based on this, Slovak historian Miroslav Huťka considered his beatification took place around 1310, with the contribution of papal legate Gentile Portino da Montefiore. Beside Hungary, Vitus' cult slightly spread into Northern Italy; still in 1466, one of the images of the St. Nicholas altar of the Chiesa di Santa Maria della Cella in Sampierdarena (today an area of Genoa) depicted Vitus along with several other Augustinian saints. After the end of the 15th century, however, the cult and knowledge of his person faded.

== Sources ==
- F. Romhányi, Beatrix (2018). Kolduló barátok, gazdálkodó szerzetesek. Koldulórendi gazdálkodás a késő középkori Magyarországon [Mendicant Friends, Farming Monks. Economic Activity of Mendicant Orders in Late Medieval Hungary] (in Hungarian). Martin Opitz Kiadó. ISBN 978-963-99-8736-4.
- Huťka, Miroslav (2012). "Vitus Pannonius, egy kevéssé ismert magyarországi középkori szent [Vitus Pannonius, a Little-known Medieval Saint in Hungary]". Magyar Sion Új folyam (in Hungarian). 6 (2). Translated by Käfer, István: 203–215. ISSN 1337-2491.
