= Martyrs of Songkhon =

Thai Catholic saints and martyrs

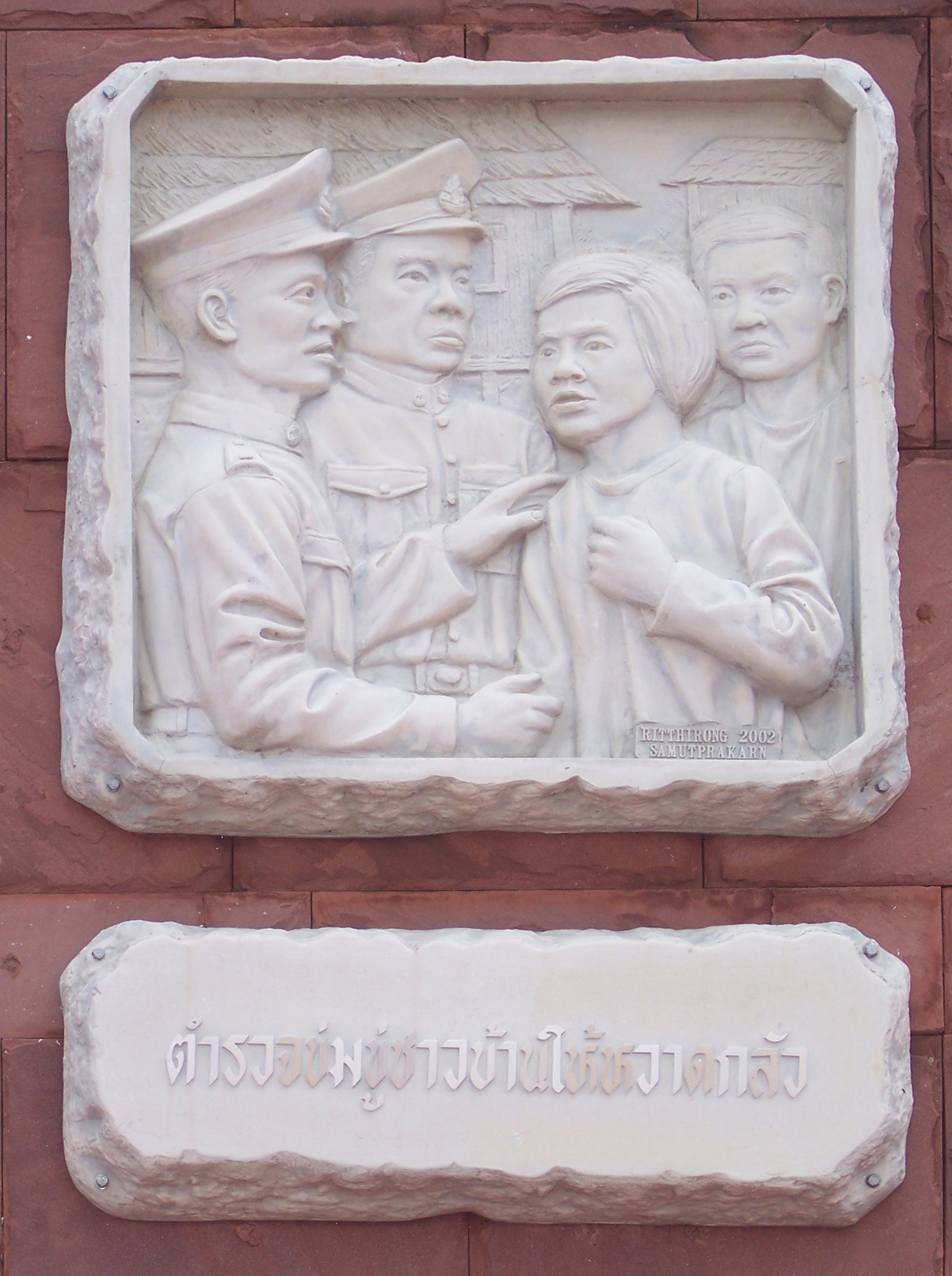
- Stone panels depicting the story of the Martyrs of Thailand, from the Our Lady of the Martyrs of Thailand Shrine in Mukdahan Province, Thailand.
- Died: December 16–26, 1940
- Martyred by: Police at Songkhon
- Means of martyrdom: gunshot
- Venerated in: Catholic Church
- Beatified: October 22, 1989, Saint Peter's Basilica, by Pope John Paul II
- Major shrine: Our Lady of the Martyrs of Thailand Shrine
- Feast: 16 December

The Martyrs of Songkhon (Thai: มรณสักขีแห่งสองคอน) (also called Seven Blessed Martyrs of Songkhon) are seven Christian Thais executed in the village Songkhon in Pong Kham subdistrict, Wan Yai District, Mukdahan Province, northeastern Thailand, in December 1940 by local police forces. The killings occurred during the Franco-Thai War and police falsely believed they were spying for the French. The victims were beatified by Pope John Paul II in Rome on October 22, 1989.

== List ==
The names of the martyrs are:

- Philip (Filip) Siphong Onphitak (Onphithakt) - [ฟิลิป สีฟอง อ่อนพิทักษ์], catechist, 33 years old
- Agnes (Aknaet) Phila, born Margarita Phila - [อักแนส พิลา], 31 years old, belonged to Lovers of the Holy Cross Congregation
- Lucia (Lusia) Khambang - [ลูซีอา คำบาง], 23 years old, belonged to Lovers of the Holy Cross Congregation
- Agatha (Akatha) Phutta (Phuttha) - [อากาทา พุดทา], a 59 year old Lao woman
- Cecilia (Sesilia) Butsi - [เซซีลีอา บุดสี], 16 years old
- Bibiana Khampai (Khamphai) - [บีบีอานา คำไพ], 15 years old
- Maria Phon - [มารีอา พร], 14 years old

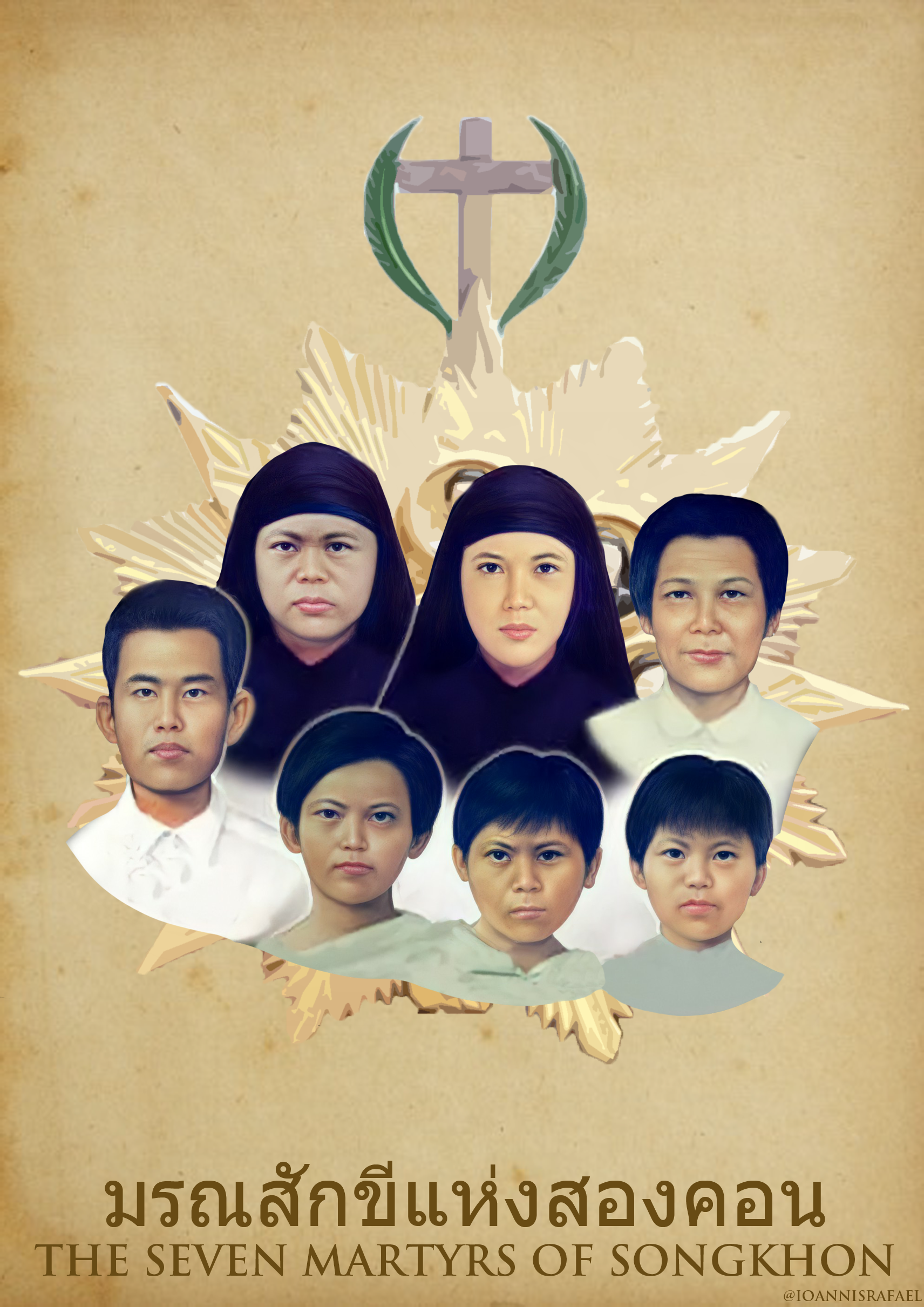
The Seven Martyrs of Songkhon, Thailand

== Letter of Sister Agnes Phila to the police before the execution ==
To the Chief Police in Songkhon

Yesterday evening you received your order to wipe out, definitely, the Name of God, the Only Lord of our lives and minds. We adore Him only, Sir. A few days earlier, you had mentioned to us that you would not wipe out the Name of God and we were rather pleased with that in such a way that we put away our religious habits which showed that we were His handmaids. But it not so today. We do profess that the religion of Christ is the only true religion. Therefore, we would like to give our answer to your question, asked yesterday evening which we did not have a chance to respond because we were unprepared for it. Now we would like to give you our answer. We are asking you to carry out your order with us. Please do not delay any longer. Please carry out your order. Please open the door of heaven to us so that we can confirm that outside the Religion of Christ no none can go to heaven. Please do it. We are well prepared. When we will be gone we will remember you. Please take pity on our souls. We will be thankful to you and will be grateful to you for it. And on the last day we will see each other face to face.

Do wait and see, please. We keep your commands, oh God, we wish to be witnesses to You, dear God. We are: Agnes, Lucia, Phuttha, Budsi, Buakhai, Suwan. We would like to bring little Phuma along with us because we love her so much. We have already made up our minds, dear Sir.
