= Luca Passi =

Italian priest (1789–1866)

Blessed Luca Passi
- Born: 22 January 1789; Bergamo, Duchy of Milan
- Died: 18 April 1866 (aged 77); Venice, Kingdom of Lombardy–Venetia
- Venerated in: Roman Catholic Church
- Beatified: 13 April 2013, Saint Mark's Basilica, Venice, Italy by Cardinal Angelo Amato
- Feast: 18 April

Luca Passi (22 January 1789 – 18 April 1866) was an Italian priest and the founder of the Teaching Sisters of Saint Dorothy. Two brothers of his were priests – following the example of their paternal uncle – and Passi himself moved to Venice in order to dedicate himself to both his preaching and educational missions.

Passi's beatification was celebrated on 13 April 2013.

== Life ==
Passi was born in 1789 in Bergamo as the first of eleven children to the nobles Enrico Passi de Preposulo (a teacher) and Caterina Corner in the province of Bergamo; two brothers were the priests Giuseppe Celio and Marco. His paternal uncle was the priest Marco Celio Passi. In his childhood volatile political circumstances forced the family to relocate to a villa in Calcinate.

In 1810 he became the director of the confraternity of the Blessed Sacrament at Calcinate and in 1811 became the director of the confraternity of the Christian Doctrine. Passi began his studies for the priesthood in 1811 and was ordained as such on 13 March 1813. His brother Marco aided him in founding the Pious Society of Saint Dorothy in 1815 for the education of both children and adolescents. This was an establishment that Pope Pius VII praised and who also encouraged that the organization expand and spread to other towns in the region. In 1838 he founded the Teaching Sisters of Saint Dorothy. Pope Gregory XVI granted him the title of "Apostolic Missionary".

Passi died on 18 April 1866.

== Beatification ==
The beatification process commenced on 6 March 1981 under Pope John Paul II and Passi became titled as a Servant of God; Cardinal Marco Cé inaugurated the cognitional process in Venice on 10 May 1982 and this process later concluded on 9 November 1983 while the Congregation for the Causes of Saints later validated this process on 10 April 1986. The C.C.S. received the Positio from the postulation in 1996 with historians first assessing and approving the cause on 24 November 1998. Theologians approved this on 8 November 2005 as did the C.C.S. on 15 May 2007; Pope Benedict XVI named the late priest as Venerable on 6 July 2007 after confirming his heroic virtue.

The single miracle for beatification was investigated on a diocesan level from 7 April to 31 June 2009 and received C.C.S. validation on 7 May 2010 before medical experts voiced their approval to it on 13 October 2011; theologians followed on 18 February 2012 as did the C.C.S. on 15 May 2012. Benedict XVI approved this miracle on 28 June 2012 and confirmed that Passi would now be beatified. Cardinal Angelo Amato beatified Passi on 13 April 2013 on the behalf of Pope Francis in Venice.

The current postulator for this cause is Sister Emmarosa Trovò.
