= Bartolomeo Cerveri =

Italian Dominican priest (1420–1466)

Blessed Bartolomeo Cerveri OP
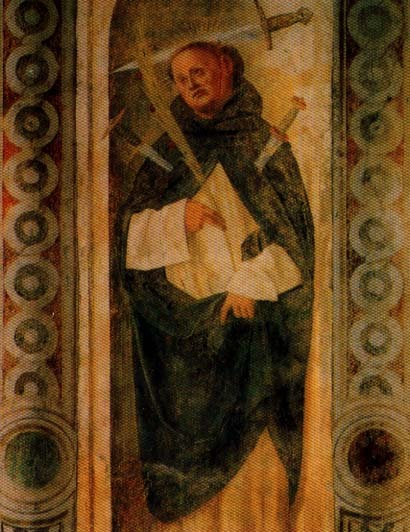

Martyr
- Born: 1420; Savigliano, Cuneo, Duchy of Savoy
- Died: 21 April 1466 (aged 46); Cervere, Cuneo, Duchy of Savoy
- Venerated in: Roman Catholic Church
- Beatified: 22 September 1853, Saint Peter's Basilica by Pope Pius IX
- Feast: 21 April
- Attributes: Dominican habit, swords piercing his body and head, martyr's palm

Bartolomeo Cerveri, OP (1420 – 21 April 1466) was an Italian Catholic priest in the Order of Preachers. He served as an inquisitor for Piedmont and Liguria and knew of threats against his life; a small group of heretics killed him in Cuneo. He was beatified by Pope Pius IX in 1853.

== Life ==
Bartolomeo Cerveri was born in 1420 in Cuneo and was noted in his childhood for his piousness and devotion to the faith.

After studies in Savigliano and Turin, he entered the Order of Preachers. In 1445, he ordained to priesthood. Cerveri obtained his licentiate as well as his master's and doctorate's degree - on 8 May 1452 - at the University of Turin in an occasion that was the first and last time when someone received all three at the same time. He taught there until 1453 until he was elected as prior of the Dominican convent in Savigliano.

Cerveri converted heretics and this led to his appointment as an inquisitor for Piedmont and Liguria in 1451 in which it was clear to him that he would soon be targeted and killed. Being a Dominican in that region at that time was dangerous and meant that heretics could take their hatred out on the new Dominican inquisitor.

He made his final confession before he set off for his final trip alongside two of his companions - the brothers Giovanni and Gianpietro Riccardi. He said of it: "I go there as an inquisitor and there I must die". On the road in Cervere he and his two companions were attacked though the five attackers wounded the companions but killed him after riddling him with dagger wounds. Those that washed his remains before his funeral found that despite the wounds he had not bled. His remains were relocated in 1802. Due to Cerveri's local veneration Pope Pius IX confirmed his beatification on 22 September 1853.
