= Félicité Pricet =

French Catholic martyr (c.1745–1794)

Félicité Pricet (born around 1745 in Châtillon-sur-Sèvre – executed on 18 January 1794 in Avrillé) was one of the French Catholic martyrs of Angers, who were massacred during the War in the Vendée for supporting the anti-royalist rebels during the French Revolution. She was beatified by Pope John Paul II in 1984 and her Feast Day is celebrated on 18 January.

== Biography ==
A laywoman, originally from Châtillon-sur-Sèvre, Deux-Sèvres, in Poitou, she was a devout Catholic and follower of the rebels of the French Revolution. Historian Jean-Clément Martin has reported on her trial; she was executed because she went to services conducted by Catholic priests supporting the rebellion and because she had an "unbearable devotion" to her faith. The letter F is written in the margin (F for fusillée or shot) of the report kept by the census commissioners. She was executed in Avrillé (Maine-et-Loire), near Angers on 18 January 1794 (30 Pluviôse year 2) with other nuns and laypeople, including Monique Pichery, Carole Lucas and Victoire Gusteau.

Félicité Pricet was beatified by Pope John Paul II on 19 February 1984, at the same time as 99 of the estimated 2,000 people shot at Avrillé or guillotined in the Angers Rally Square between 1793 and 1794. The Feast Day for Blessed Félicité Pricet is 18 January. She is also honored as one of the "Martyrs of Anjou."

== Historical context ==
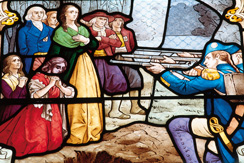
Image of the shootings conducted in 1794 by General Turreau's troops.

Between April and January 1794, during the Vendée wars, nearly 2,000 people were shot in Avrillé and buried in 12 graves by the troops commanded by General Louis Marie Turreau. The Champ des Martyrs, where these executions took place, has become a place of pilgrimage in Anjou. The Saint-Louis Chapel of the Field of Martyrs was built on that same site in 1852.
