= Joséphine Leroux =

French Poor Clare nun

Blessed Joséphine Leroux

Martyr
- Born: 23 January 1747; Cambrai, Kingdom of France
- Died: 23 October 1794; Valenciennes, French First Republic
- Venerated in: Roman Catholic Church
- Beatified: 13 June 1920 by Pope Benedict XV
- Feast: October 23

Joséphine Leroux (23 January 1747 – 23 October 1794), born Anne-Josepha Leroux, was a French Poor Clare, executed during the French Revolution.

== Life ==
She was born in Cambrai, France. At the age of twenty-two, she entered the Poor Clare monastery in Valenciennes, taking the religious name Joséphine. Her sister Marie was an Ursuline, also in Valenciennes.

When the monasteries and convents were suppressed during the French Revolution, she fled to her family in Mons, Hainaut, as did her sister. When Austrian forces took the city, there was a brief period of peace, and Joséphine returned to Valenciennes in 1793. Since her own Poor Clare monastery had been destroyed, she and her sister resumed religious life at the Ursuline convent.

The revolutionary army retook the city and in 1794, she and several other nuns were arrested on the grounds that they were emigres who had returned without permission and were running a religious school. They were condemned for high treason. On October 23, 1794 she and her sister, two other Ursulines, and two Bridgettine nuns were guillotined. The nuns went to their deaths singing the Litany of Loretto.

== Veneration ==
Joséphine Leroux was beatified by Pope Benedict XV in 1920.
