= Chronological list of saints and blesseds =

A list of saints and blesseds in chronological order, sorted by date of death:

(note: Many churches also have saints from before the birth of Christ that are not included in this series)

- 1st century (1–100)
- 2nd century (101–200)
- 3rd century (201–300)
- 4th century (301–400)
- 5th century (401–500)
- 6th century (501–600)
- 7th century (601–700)
- 8th century (701–800)
- 9th century (801–900)
- 10th century (901–1000)
- 11th century (1001–1100)
- 12th century (1101–1200)
- 13th century (1201–1300)
- 14th century (1301–1400)
- 15th century (1401–1500)
- 16th century (1501–1600)
- 17th century (1601–1700)
- 18th century (1701–1800)
- 19th century (1801–1900)
- 20th century (1901–2000)
- 21st century (2001–2100)
