= Third Order of Saint Dominic =

Order of religious men and women

Shield of the Order with Dominican Cross

The Third Order of Saint Dominic (Latin: Tertius Ordo Praedicatorum; abbreviated TOP), also referred to as the Lay Fraternities of Saint Dominic or Lay Dominicans since 1972, and sometimes abbreviated to TOSD, is a Catholic third order which is part of the Dominican Order.

As members of the Order of Preachers, Lay Dominicans are men and women, single or married, living a Christian life with a Dominican spirituality in the secular world. They find inspiration in the spiritual path taken by many saints, blesseds, and other holy men and women throughout the 800-year history of the Dominican Order. The life of a Dominican layperson incorporates passion for the Word of God into the community of fellow Dominicans and the religious practices of the order. Lay Dominicans are members of worldwide provinces, bound to the governance structure of the Order of Preachers.

== Background ==
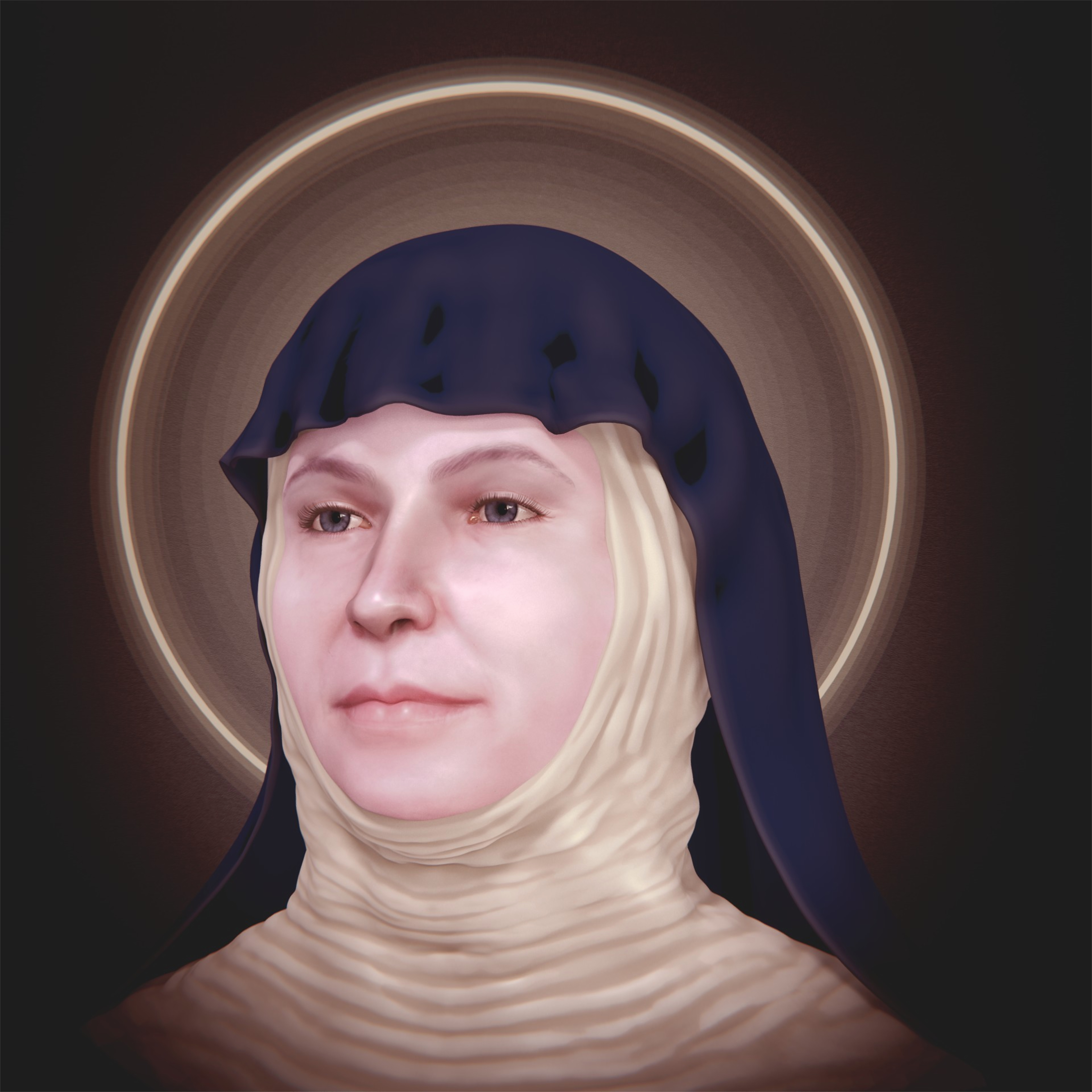
St. Zdislava of Lemberk

Dominic de Guzmán established the Ordo Praedicatorum in 1215. There are four principal branches:

- Friars – The "First Order", these are the brothers and priests who take solemn vows of poverty, chastity and obedience. Friars may be involved in various ministries.
- Nuns – The "Second Order" pre-dates the friars, as the Dominican nuns trace their founding to a monastery for women Dominic established at Prouille around 1206. Like the friars, the nuns also take solemn vows, but lead an enclosed, contemplative life of prayer.
- Third Order – Dominic did not personally found the Third Order but, from the beginning of the Order of Preachers, there have always been lay people who associated themselves with the Friars.

There are two types of Third Order organizations:

  - Secular – More commonly called "Lay Dominicans". Secular Dominicans began in the thirteenth century as lay people who wished to adopt Dominican spirituality. They were given a rule in 1285.
  - Regular – Congregations of Dominican sisters formed in the nineteenth century. This development can be traced to both the Dominican nuns and secular women tertiaries. Part of the impetus came from bishops in mission territories requesting nuns to assist with opening orphanages, schools, and hospitals. Far from the motherhouse, many of these communities, no longer fully enclosed, separated to form separate congregations. A second reason for the establishment of Dominican congregations was the desire of secular tertiaries to combine living in community with an active apostolate. Dominican sisters are not enclosed. They take simple vows, live in convents, and are engaged in many different apostolates.
- Priestly Fraternities – Prior to Vatican II, the Dominican Third Order secular included both lay persons and clergy. A separate fraternity, with its own constitution and rule, was established at that time for diocesan priests. Members remain under the jurisdiction of their bishops, but are also part of a chapter attached to a nearby Dominican convent of friars.

== History ==
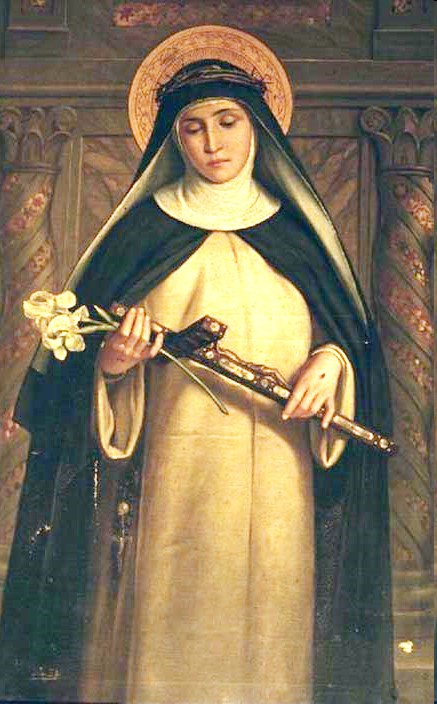
Catherine of Siena

In the eleventh century there were secular associations, called Penitential Orders, connected with some Benedictine congregations, and later with the Premonstratensians, as well. As the Dominican friars established monasteries and priories, there were lay people who assisted them. Many were attracted to the Dominican's way of life, but for various reasons could not themselves join the order. They formed fraternities or religious guilds affiliated with the local priory. This was a way those who sought a more dedicated way of life embraced a lifestyle similar to that of the Dominicans while retaining their status as a lay person. At first vaguely constituted and living without system or form, its members gradually grew more and more dependent on their spiritual guides. In 1285 Munio of Zamora, the seventh Master General of the Friars Preachers, formulated a definite Rule for these lay penitents. It was based in part on the rule Francis of Assisi gave the Brothers and Sisters of Penance around 1221.

Members who chose to follow this rule would be under the direction of a local Dominican priest. They were called the "Brothers and Sisters of Penance of the Blessed Dominic". Pope Honorius IV granted this new fraternity official church recognition in January 1286.

A military order, called the Militia Jesu Christi, was founded in Languedoc around 1221. Also supervised by the Dominicans, they were merged with the "Brothers and Sisters of Penance of the Blessed Dominic" at the close of the 13th century. This amalgamation is admitted by the Bollandists to have become general in the 14th century. The confraternity was commonly referred to as the Order of Penance and were not specifically called a third order until after papal recognition in 1405.

Many held that the condemnation passed on the Beguines and Beghards at the Council of Vienna in 1312 applied no less to the Orders of Penance. In consequence the master-general petitioned Pope John XXII in 1326 to clarify the matter. As a result, he answered by a bull of 1 June 1326 (Cum de Mulieribus), which is a long eulogium on the work of the Dominican Third Order. After the plague of 1348, a good deal of laxity and disorganization crept into the Third Order, but there were also a number of saints such as Catherine of Siena whose influence strengthened it.

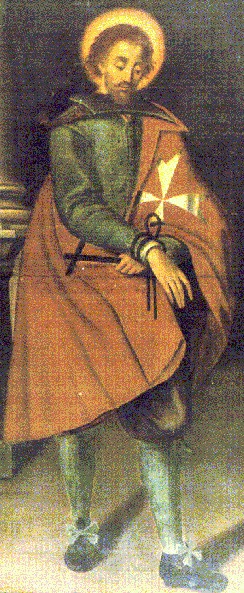
Sir Adrian Fortescue

== Spirit ==
Because they belonged to the Third Order, members were often called Tertiaries, however this word is only used in Italian, Maltese and Spanish as now the most common term is "Lay Dominicans".

The initial purpose behind the Lay Fraternities of St. Dominic was the preaching of penance; but under Dominican influences it leaned to the intellectual aspect of the faith and based its message on the exposition of the creed. This focus on penance remains a central part of the Dominican charism. "In complementarity with brothers, sisters and nuns they share the charism of St. Dominic through study, prayer, preaching and fraternal life." These are known as "The Four Pillars of the Order", and give shape to Lay Dominican spirituality.

== Types ==
The Third Order as it exists today can be divided into two categories: regular, i.e. comprising Tertiaries who live in community according to a common rule; and secular, i.e. whether married or single, lay people, who live their lives like others of their profession, but who strive, as far as individual circumstances permit, to live a more religious life.

=== Secular ===
Just as the friars and nun, lay Dominicans follow the Rule of St. Augustine, plus the Rule of the Lay Fraternities of Saint Dominic. The obligations of the Laity are: 1) Daily praying of Lauds and Vespers 2) Daily 5 decades of the rosary 3) Daily Our Father, Hail Mary, and Eternal Rest for all Dominicans 4) Daily 15 minutes of mental prayer or Lectio Divina (prayerful reading of the Sacred Scriptures) 5) Daily Mass and communion is recommended 6) Confession at least monthly 7) Attendance at the monthly Chapter meeting 8) Yearly participation at 3 Masses for Dominicans 9) Fasting on the vigils of St. Dominic, St. Catherine of Siena, and Our Lady of the Rosary if possible.

There are five provinces of Lay Dominicans in North America: one in Canada, and four in the United States.

=== Regular (Conventual) ===
In 1842 Margaret Hallahan founded the Dominican Congregation of St. Catherine of Siena in Coventry, England.

In 1850, Boniface Wimmer, a Benedictine from Saint Vincent Abbey in Latrobe, Pennsylvania visited the Monastery of the Holy Cross in Ratisbon, Bavaria and persuaded the prioress to send some nuns to minister to German immigrants in America. In 1853, they founded the Congregation of the Holy Cross in Brooklyn, New York. From this, seven additional congregations sprang serving in thirty-five dioceses.

Also in the United States, in 1995, the three congregations of Dominican sisters merged to form the Dominican Sisters of Hope.

In 2009, the congregation of the Dominican Sisters of Peace was formed with the union of seven previously separate Dominican communities. This included the Congregation of St. Catherine of Siena, founded in Springfield, Kentucky in 1822; the first of the third order foundations of women of the Dominican order in the United States. Also included were the Dominican Sisters of St. Mary of the Springs, founded in 1830 in Columbus, Ohio as a daughter house of the Kentucky community. An eighth congregation joined in 2012.

The Dominican Sisters International Confederation has a membership of 19,407 sisters representing 147 congregations in 109 countries.

== Notable members ==
=== Saints and blesseds ===
- Margherita of Città di Castello (c. 1287–1320)
- Zdislava Berka (c. 1220–1252)
- Alberto da Bergamo (c. 1214–1279)
- Benvenuta Boiani (1254–1292)
- Giovanna da Orvieto (1264–1306)
- Simone Balacchi (c. 1240–1319)
- Villana de' Botti (1332–1361)
- Sibyllina Biscossi (1287–1367)
- Caterina Benincasa (1347–1380)
- Colomba Guadagnoli (1467–1501)
- Osanna Andreasi (1449–1505)
- Stefana Quinzani (1457–1530)
- Adrian Fortescue (c. 1480–1539)
- Lucia Brocadelli (1476–1544)
- Ozana Kosić (1493–1565)
- Caterina Mattei (1486–1574)
- Maria Bartolomea Bagnesi (1514–1577)
- John Bourke (1550–1607)
- Isabel Flores de Oliva (1586–1617)
- Lorenzo Ruiz (c. 1600–1637)
- Alessandra de' Ricci (1522–1590)
- Louis-Marie Grignion de Montfort (1673–1716)
- Catherine Jarrige (1754–1836)
- Pauline-Marie Jaricot (1799–1862)
- Narcisa de Jesús Martillo Morán (1832–1869)
- Arnold Janssen (1837–1909)
- José Gabriel del Rosario Brochero (1840–1914)
- Pier Giorgio Frassati (1901–1925)
- Bartolo Longo (1841–1926)
- Teodora Fracasso (1901–1927)
- Dina Bélanger (1897–1929)
- Élisabeth Bergeron (1851–1936)

=== Others ===
- Marguerite of Ypres (1216–1237)
- Mechthild of Magdeburg (c. 1207–c. 1294)
- Louise Borgia (1500–1553)
- Claudia Felicitas von Habsburg (1653–1676)
- Claudia de Angelis (1675–1715)
- Benoîte Rencurel (1647–1718)
- Maria Rosa Agostini (1722–1768)
- Columba Schonath (1730–1787)
- Manuel Belgrano (1770–1820)
- Martín Miguel de Güemes (1785–1821)
- Juan Donoso Cortés (1809–1853)
- Giuseppina Faro (1847–1871)
- Matthias Eberhard (1815–1876)
- José Bernardo Alzedo (1788–1878)
- Francis Amherst (1819–1883)
- Claudius Lavergne (1815–1887)
- Louise Nicolle (1847–1889)
- Sophie Charlotte von Wittelsbach (1847–1897)
- Annie Chambers Ketchum (1824–1904)
- Samuel Henderson (c. 1827–1907)
- Émile Keller (1828–1909)
- Maria Clotilde di Savoia Bonaparte (1843–1911)
- Agnes McLaren (1837–1913)
- Ernest Psichari (1883–1914)
- Guido Negri (1888–1916)
- Pierre Cuypers (1827–1921)
- Pope Benedict XV (1854–1922)
- Wilhelm Cuno (1876–1933)
- Edward Bullough (1880–1934)
- Marc-André Raffalovich (1864–1934)
- Proceso Gabriel (1887–1935)
- Anna Abrikosova (1882–1936)
- Lisamaria Meirowsky (1904–1942)
- Maurice Denis (1870–1943)
- Henri Ghéon (1875–1944)
- Madeleine Radziwiłł (1861–1945)
- Luisa Piccarreta (1865–1947)
- Martin Grabmann (1875–1949)
- Sigrid Undset (1882–1949)
- Liane de Pougy (1869–1950)
- Thierry Sandre (1891–1950)
- Hilary Pepler (1878–1951)
- Manuel and Adela Casesnoves (d. 1958–d. 1988)
- Carlos Saavedra Lamas (1878–1959)
- Desmond Chute (1895–1962)
- Édouard de Macedo (1900–1965)
- Margarete Sommer (1893–1965)
- Joseph Cribb (1892–1967)
- Zofia Kossak-Szczucka (1889–1968)
- Friedrich Christian von Wettin (1893–1968)
- Bernardo Houssay (1887–1971)
- Irene of Greece (1904–1974)
- Giorgio La Pira (1904–1977)
- Aldo Moro (1916–1978)
- Anna Kamieńska (1920–1986)
- Ursula Fleming (1930–1992)
- Jane Wyman (1917–2007)
- Hanna-Renate Laurien (1928–2010)
- Franciszek Macharski (1927–2016)
- Alexandre do Nascimento (1925–2024)
- Martinez Hewlett (born 1942)
- John Saward (born 1947)
- Paul Williams (born 1950)
- Jose Advincula (born 1952)
- Jun Banaag (born 1951)
- Erik Borgman (born 1957)
- Fernando Cervantes (born 1958)
- Bernardito Auza (born 1959)
- James MacMillan (born 1959)
- Socrates Villegas (born 1960)
- José Tolentino de Mendonça (born 1965)
- Frank Leo (born 1971)
- Sérgio Dias Branco (born 1977)

== See also ==
- Dominican Order
