= Villana =

Villana may refer to:

- Villana de' Botti, Italian Catholic professed member of the Third Order of Saint Dominic
- Villana Santiago Pacheco, Puerto Rican rapper, singer and songwriter
