= Croce al Tempio Lamentation =

Painting by Fra Angelico

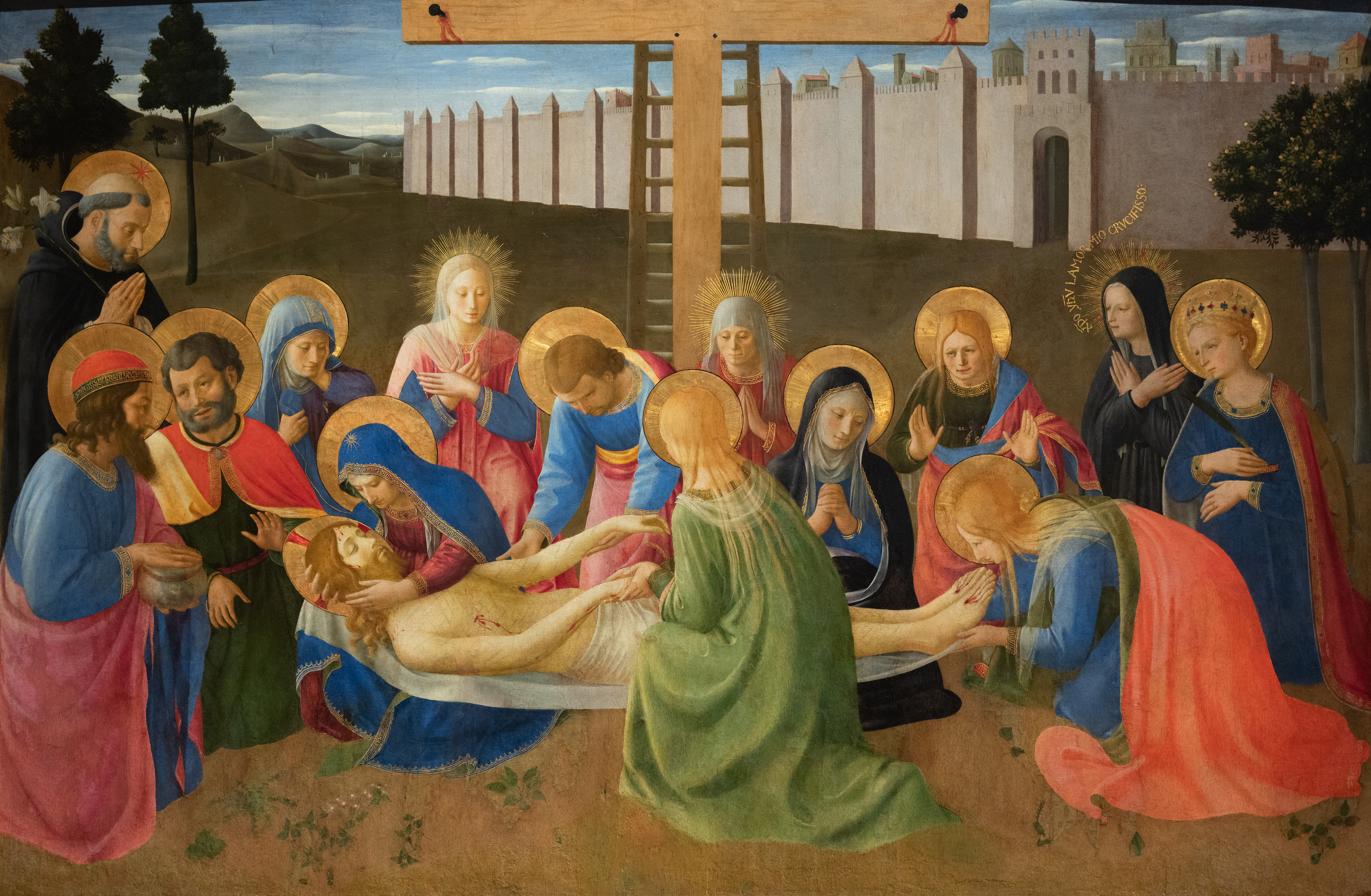
- Artist: Fra Angelico
- Year: 1436
- Medium: tempera on panel
- Dimensions: 105 cm × 164 cm (41 in × 65 in)
- Location: Museo nazionale di San Marco, Florence

The Croce al Tempio Lamentation is a 1436 or 1440 tempera-on-panel painting by Fra Angelico, now in the Museo nazionale di San Marco in Florence. It is named after its commissioner, the 'Compagnia di Santa Maria della Croce al Tempio'.

== History ==
Most art historians state the work was commissioned in April 1436 and completed that December, drawing on records stating that the artist was paid 18 lire and 8 soldi for the work. Others argue that the letters hidden on the edge of the Virgin Mary's cloak – MIIIXXXX (1440) – mean the work was left half-finished and was only completed after the artist returned from his 1439–40 staty in Cortona.

The Compagnia's representative was Jacopo Benintendi, nephew of Villana de' Botti, a pious woman linked to the Dominican order, whose relics were linked to the Confraternity. According to her hagiography by Razzi entitled Santi e Beati dell'Ordine Domenicano, she aspired to share Christ's sufferings and had frequent visions of him as her heavenly spouse. She and Saint Dominic appear in the work.

The work was moved to the Compagnia's Chiesetta al Tempio, later demolished for the siege of Florence. There the Compagnia received prisoners on their way to the scaffold and then buried their bodies in the adjacent cemetery after execution. Several paintings were lost in the demolition, including one by Pisanello as well as external frescoes by Spinello Aretino. Lamentation was displayed on the high-altar behind the crucifix and was moved to the Galleria delle Belle Arti before the church's demolition, before later moving to its present home.

Some of the figures are of lower quality and not in the master's hand, but the landscape on the left is securely attributed to him, with Jerusalem portrayed in the guise of Florence, including Lorenzo Ghiberti's Ark of San Zenobi. A large area at the base of the painting was lost beyond repair after damage in the 1966 flooding in Florence.
