= Maria Rosa Agostini =

Italian mystic

Servant of God Maria Rosa Agostini TOSD
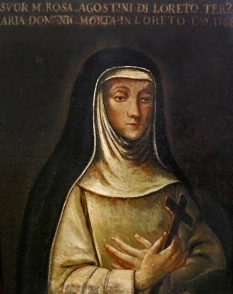
- Portrait of Sister Maria Rosa Agostini, oil on canvas, c. 1800
- Born: 3 May 1722; Loreto, Ancona, Italy
- Died: 16 March 1768 (aged 45); Loreto, Ancona, Italy

Maria Rosa Agostini (3 May 1722 – 16 March 1768) was an Italian lay Dominican regarded as "the Merchant Saint of Loreto". She was in consideration for sainthood.

== Biography ==
She was a Dominican tertiary and lived with her family who owned a merchant shop in the city, facing the incomplete south section of the west wing of Basilica della Santa Casa. She was known for her piety, devotion to the Child Jesus and mystical writings.

== Beatification ==
Her cause for beatification has been initiated on 16 April 1791 with the approval of Pope Pius VI after her 9 miracles were recorded and confirmed. It was eventually halted on 7 December 1884 and has since not commenced. She is venerated a "venerable" in the Dominican Order.

In 2016, Bianca Gjomarkaj Nakovics, a descendant of Agostini, published a book entitled La Merchaiai Santa di Loreto: Venerabile Maria Rosa Agostini, La Sua Vita e Morte in her memory and revive an interest on her saintly life.
