= Émile Keller =

French writer and politician

Émile Keller TOSD
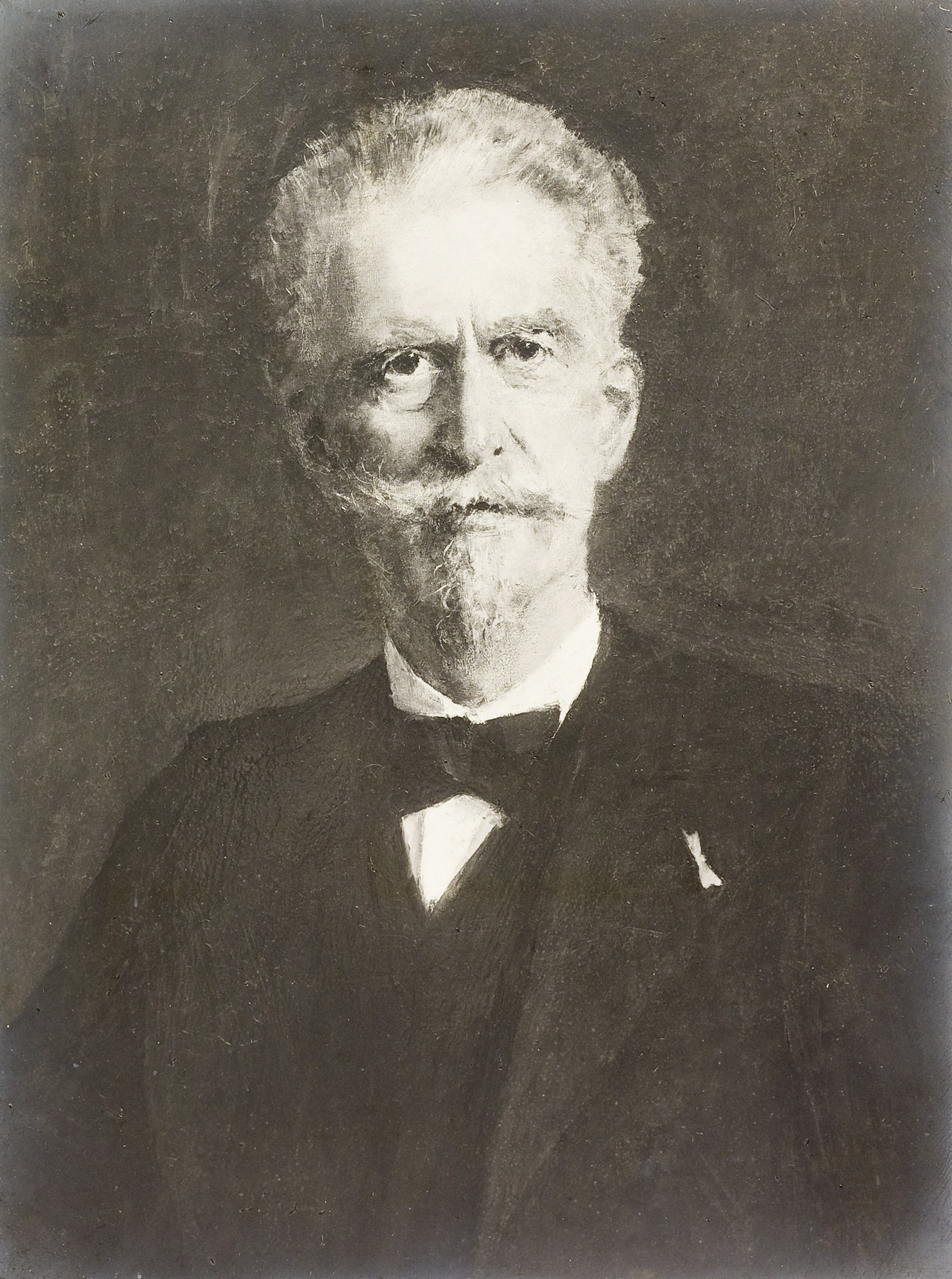
- Born: 8 October 1828; Belfort
- Died: 20 February 1909 (aged 80)
- Occupation: Writer, politician
- Awards: Chevalier of the Legion of Honour

Émile Keller (Belfort,October 8, 1828 – 1909) was a French writer and politician.

== Biography ==
In 1857 he was elected as a deputy for the Haut-Rhin district to the French Assembly. He soon made himself prominent as a leader of the Roman Catholic Party. He lost his seat in 1863, but was reelected in 1869. He was commander of a company of volunteers during the Franco-Prussian War. After the war, he again joined the Assembly as Haut-Rhin representative in 1871. He made a stirring speech against the cession of Alsace-Lorraine to Germany. When the treaty was signed, he left the Assembly with other Alsatians, but was back as representative for Belfort in 1876, and again in 1885.

== Works ==
- Histoire de France (1888)
- L'Encyclique et les libertés de l'église gallicane (1860)
- L'Encyclique et les principes de 1789 (1865)
- Le générale de Lamoricière (1873)
- Les congregations religeuses en France (1880)

These works are written from the Catholic point of view and, for this reason, they were long read and popular in Catholic circles.
