= Lisamaria Meirowsky =

German pediatrician (1904–1942)

Lisamaria Meirowsky (September 17, 1904 in Graudenz-August 9, 1942 in Auschwitz) was a German dermatologist and pediatrician murdered by the Nazis because of her Jewish heritage.

== Life ==
Lisamaria Meirowsky was the daughter of the dermatologist Emil Meirowsky, who opened a practice in Cologne-Lindenthal in 1908. After graduating from high school in Cologne, she began studying medicine at the Friedrich Wilhelm University in Bonn in 1923. In 1925, she went to Munich for two years to continue her medical studies. Back in Bonn, she graduated in 1929. She received her doctorate from the Ludwig-Maximilians-Universität München (LMU) in Munich in 1933. The title of the dissertation in the field of dermatology was "Über das Krankheitsbild des Erythema palmoplantare symmetricum hereditarium." After a long illness, she went to Rome in 1933, obtained a doctorate in the field of pediatrics, and there made the acquaintance of the Dominican friar Franziskus Maria Stratmann She converted from Judaism to Catholicism on October 15, 1933, and took the name Maria Magdalena Dominika in the Third Order of St. Dominic.

== Nazi persecution ==
In 1938, persecuted as a "non-Aryan" despite her conversion, Meirowsky went to Utrecht in the Netherlands with the Dominican Fr. Stratmann. In October 1941 she went into hiding in the Trappist Abbey of Our Lady of Koningsoord near Tilburg, where she worked as a doctor and porter. On July 26, 1942, the Archbishop of Utrecht, Johannes de Jong, had a pastoral letter read out against the Germans' actions against the Jews. In response, on August 2, 1942, 244 former Jews who had converted to Catholicism, among them Lisamaria Meirowsky and the siblings Edith and Rosa Stein, were arrested by the Gestapo and deported to the Westerbork concentration camp, probably on August 4, 1942. From there they were taken to the Auschwitz concentration camp on August 7, 1942, and murdered on August 9.

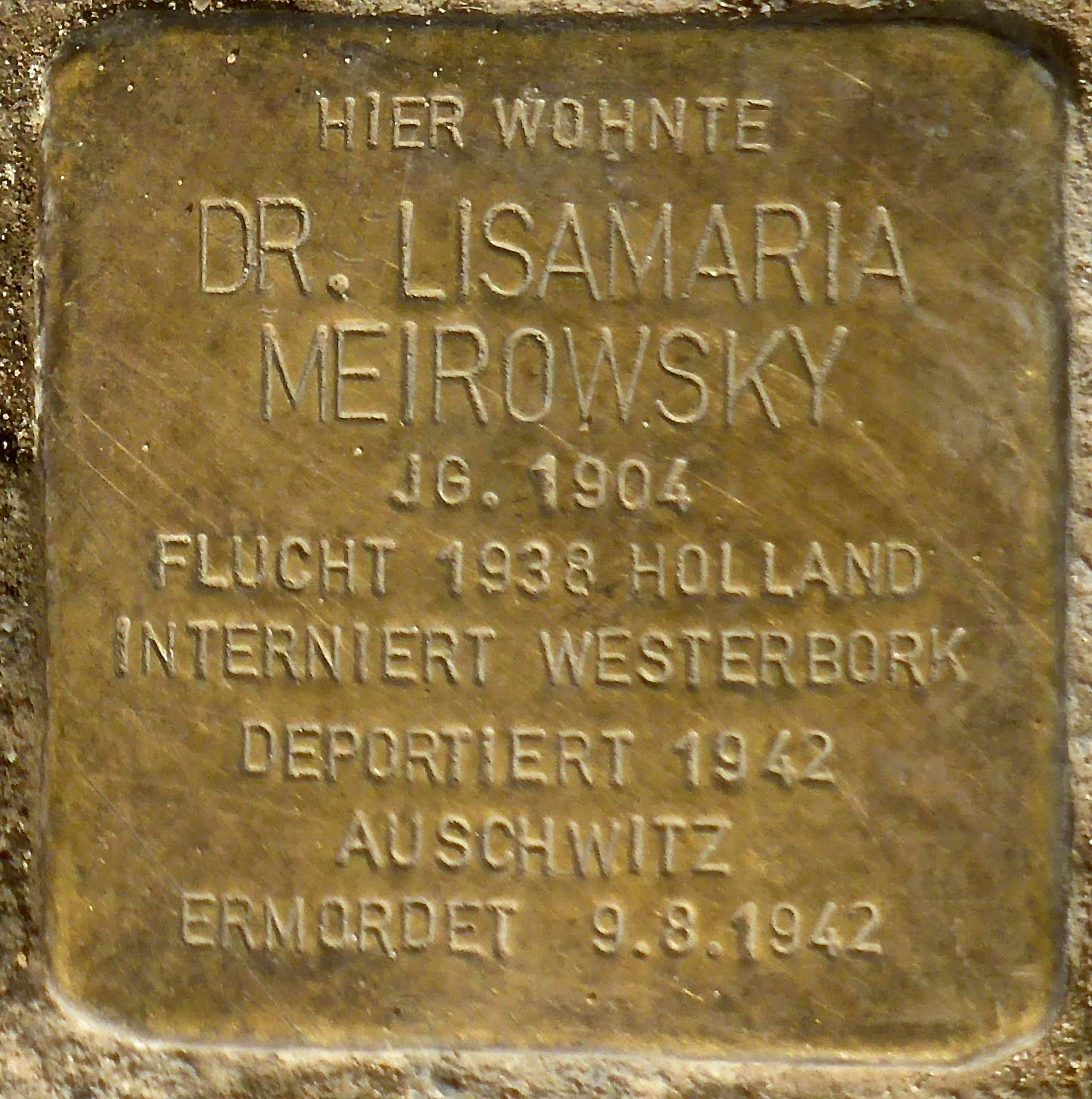
Stolperstein for Lisamaria Meirowsky (Fürst-Pückler-Straße 42)

== Commemoration ==
The Catholic Church included Lisamaria Meirowsky as a witness of faith in the German Martyrology of the 20th century. In May 2014, a commemorative paving stone was laid in front of her last residence in Cologne-Lindenthal at Fürst-Pückler-Strasse 42 by students of a Cologne high school.

== Publications ==
- Über das Krankheitsbild des Erythema palmoplantare symmetricum hereditarium, Springer, Berlin 1933

== Literature ==
- Franziskus Stratmann: Die Todesgefährtin Edith Steins: Lisamaria Meirowsky. Christ in der Gegenwart, 19, 1968
- Helmut Moll (Hrsg. im Auftrag der Deutschen Bischofskonferenz), Zeugen für Christus. Das deutsche Martyrologium des 20. Jahrhunderts, Paderborn u. a. 1999, 7. überarbeitete und aktualisierte Auflage 2019, ISBN 978-3-506-78012-6, Band I, S. 385–388.
- Walter Tetzlaff: 2000 Kurzbiographien bedeutender deutscher Juden des 20. Jahrhunderts. Askania, Lindhorst 1982, ISBN 3-921730-10-4.
- Elisabeth Prégardier, Anne Mohr (Hrsg.): Passion im August – Edith Stein und Gefährtinnen: Weg in Tod und Auferstehung. Plöger Verlag, Annweiler 1995, ISBN 978-3-898-57067-1.
- P. W. F. M. Hamans: Edith Stein and Companions: On the Way to Auschwitz. Ignatius Press, 2010, S. 181–194.
