= Guido Negri =

Italian soldier

Servant of God Guido Negri TOSD
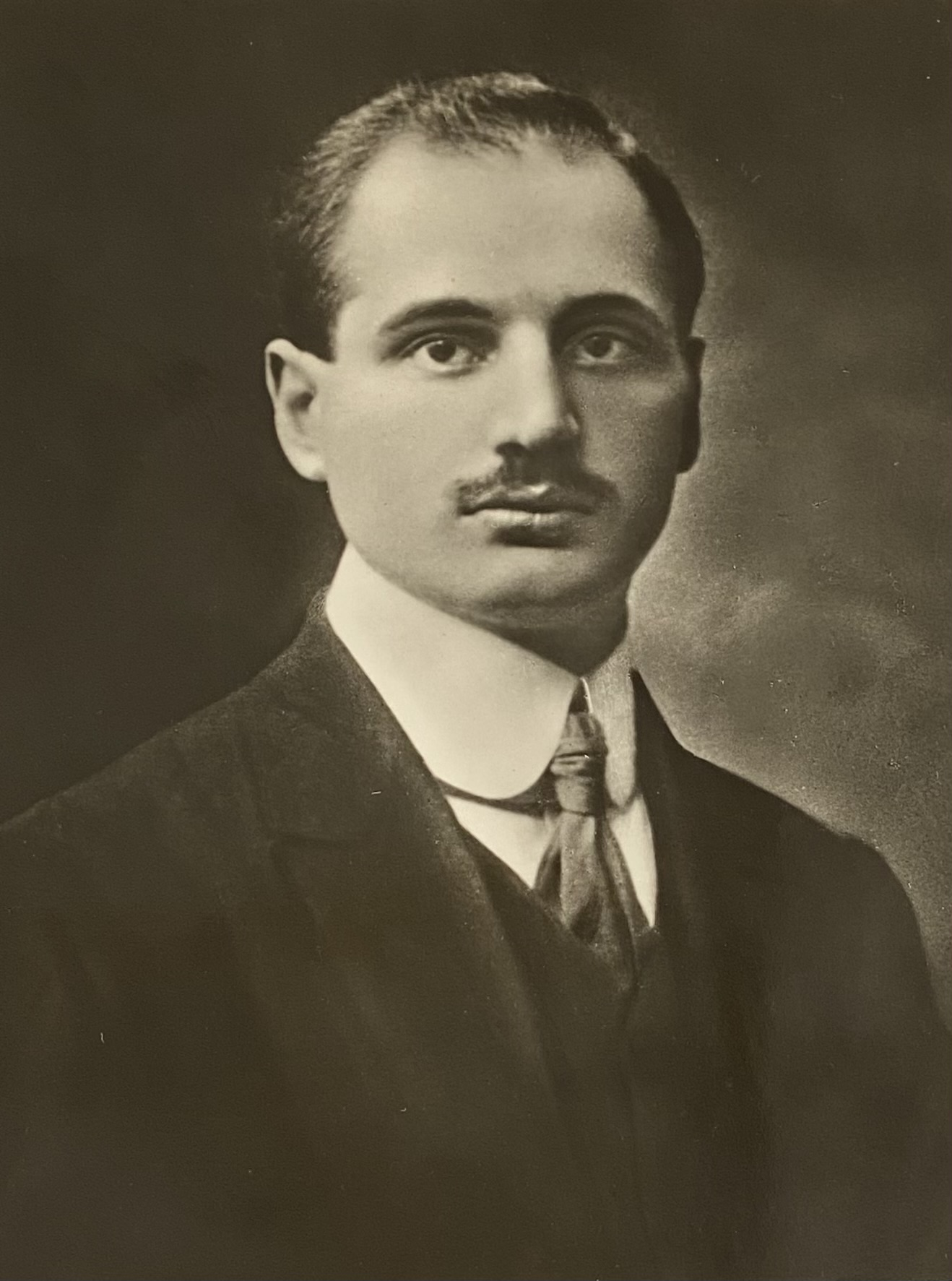
- Born: 25 August 1888; Este, Veneto, Padua, Italy
- Died: 27 June 1916 (aged 27); Monte Colombara, Asiago, Vicenza, Italy

Guido Negri (25 August 1888 – 27 June 1916) was an Italian soldier called "The Holy Captain". His cause for canonization was opened on 26 April 1935 by Carlo Agostini, Bishop of Padua.

== Biography ==
=== Early life ===
He was born on 25 August 1888 in Este, in the province of Padua. He was the twelfth and last child of Evangelista Negri and Ludovica Belluco. At just four years old, Guido lost his father, who managed the pharmacy he owned in the main square of the city. Her mother, once widowed, was too busy managing the pharmacy and was not inclined to educate her children on the precepts of Christianity, also because at the end of the 19th century many anticlerical families boycotted shops sympathetic to the Catholics. In his adolescence, Guido assiduously attended the Patronato Santissimo Redentore, he studied at the Royal Gymnasium of Este from 1899 to 1904, receiving public praise from the principal and in 1904 he began to be part of the Italian Catholic Youth, enrolling in the "Circolo San Prosdocimo", highlighting Christian fervor and steadfastness in apostolic work. His ideas materialized in the public defense of the Pope and in the collection in favor of St. Peter's Pence with the constant commitment to Holy Communion and Eucharistic Adoration.

=== Adolescence ===
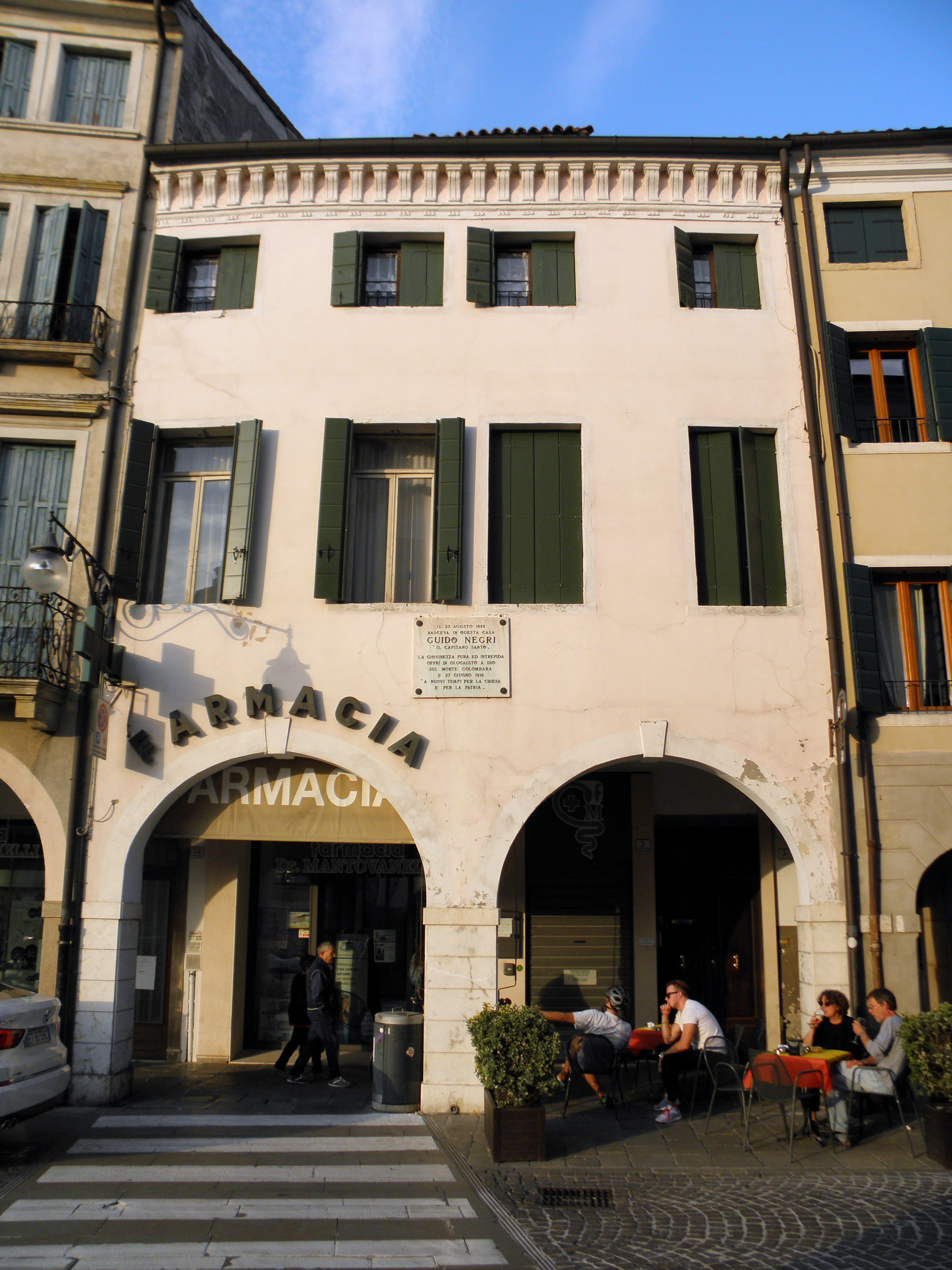
Birthplace of Guido Negri.

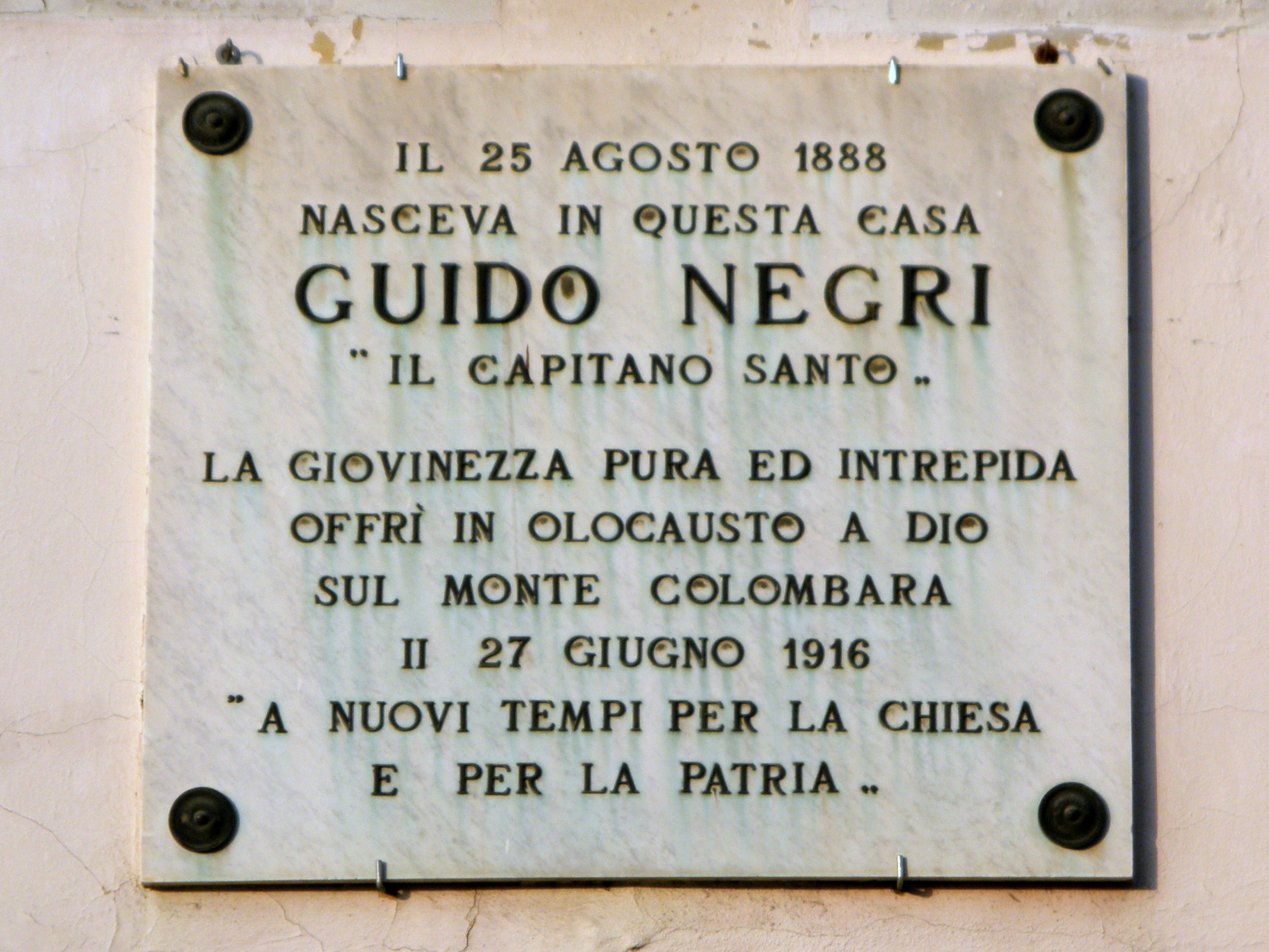
Plaque on the facade of the Negri's birthplace.

In 1907, Negri obtained his high school diploma and subsequently obtained his classical high school diploma in Verona as a private student. Upon completing his studies, he enrolled in the Faculty of Letters at the University of Padua. Fatherless and part of a large family, to help his mother financially he voluntarily enlisted for military service in Padua and followed the officers' course, obtaining his first assignment as an infantry second lieutenant the following year in Florence. In the meantime, he attended various courses at the Florentine university in his few spare moments, significantly delaying his studies.

From 1911 to 1913, he held the role of President of the Catholic University of Padua and then returned to the University of Padua, after his discharge from military service. At the same time he continued the lay apostolate in Este in his Circolo San Prosdocimo.

In 1909, he became a Dominican tertiary at the parish of Santa Maria delle Grazie in Este with the name of Fra Thomas Aquinas, becoming eventually the master of novices. In 1913, he was invited as a speaker at the National Congress of Dominican Tertiaries in Florence. The Capuchin Leopold Mandić from Castelnuovo served as his spiritual guide in his secular ministry.

In February 1911, Negri was called up for the Italo-Turkish War and moved to Treviso to prepare for the military exams to qualify for the higher grade. He obtained his discharge in 1914 and, although he had not yet completed his university studies, he accepted the position of teacher at the schools of the Institute of the Canavis Fathers of Possagno, in the province of Treviso, to also raise the economic needs of the family. This working period also allowed him to apply himself more to university studies. Also in 1914 the San Prosdocimo Club was suspended by the Ecclesiastical Authority because it did not completely comply with the dictates of the authority itself and because it was suspected of inappropriate political freedoms.

Leaving Este for Possagno, Negri also concluded one of his dearest ministry, helping the poor at the Conference of San Vincenzo in the Cathedral of Este.

=== Relationship ===
In 1904, at the age of sixteen, Negri knew love and it was "true love" as he wrote in the letters addressed to his beloved Santina Cortelazzo, the fifteen years old daughter of a merchant from Este. Unfortunately, both Santina's father and Guido's mother were opposed to this relationship. These impediments led to the conclusion of this relationship in 1914, made up of brief meetings and mainly epistolary, with great suffering for both young people. In those years, Negri took shape with his choice of lay apostolate and a lifestyle more suited to his personality which meant living in the world in an authentically Christian way, without the need to become priests, taking a vow of chastity first annually and then every five years.

=== Final years ===
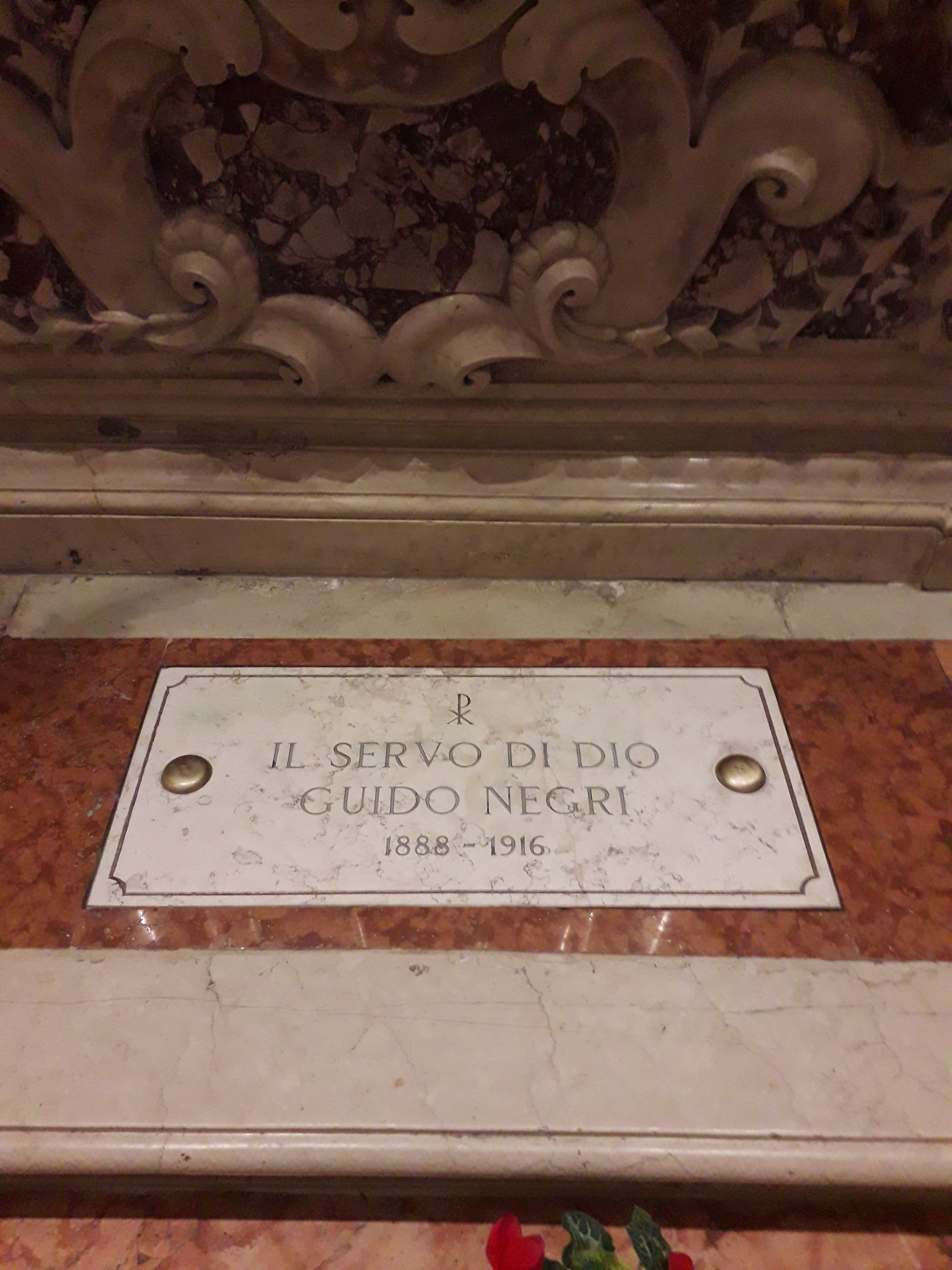
Negri's tomb in the Este Cathedral.

In 1915, very close to his long-awaited graduation, Negri was once again called up to arms and sent to Cadore. From September 1915 to March 1916, during military maneuvers, he was repeatedly admitted to a military hospital severely tested by the suffering and sacrifices on the front. Finally, on March 14, 1916, the degree in literature arrived, after a process slowed down by unexpected events.

Fifteen days after graduation, having achieved the rank of captain, he assumed command of the 5th Company of the 228th Infantry Regiment of the Rovigo Brigade. In that period the Rovigo Brigade was largely made up of boys born in 1896, eight years younger than him and Negri, as captain, had the opportunity to spread and demonstrate the Gospel to everyone with his conduct and his indissoluble faith those around him, superiors, fellow soldiers and subordinates.

On 4 June 1916, he left for the front on the Asiago Plateau. The four days that followed were of bloody battle, in the effort to obey the command to conquer the Austrian position on the slopes of Monte Colombara.

On June 27, 1916, at just twenty-seven years old, at 6.30 pm, as evening fell, he lost his life, fatally struck by an enemy bullet. He was called "The Holy Captain" as he repeated several times, with "The soul to Heaven, the heart to Rome." Before the start of the fateful battle, in his spiritual diary he wrote: "To You, Divine Victim of Gethsemane: it is the hour ... All is accomplished! Oh! Let us go! Let us go, Oh Jesus!"
