= Emil Meirowsky =

German dermatologist (1876–1960)

Emil Meirowsky (March 9, 1876, in Guttstadt, Germany – January 22, 1960, in Nashville) was a German dermatologist and author.

== Early career ==
Meirowsky studied at the universities of Berlin and Königsberg, where he received his doctorate in 1901. He interned at the Berlin Polyclinic with Oscar Werler, in Breslau with Albert Neisser, with Paul Gerson Unna and in Paris. From 1908 the family lived in Cologne-Lindenthal. He opened a practice with his own laboratory. In 1919 he received the title of professor. In 1920 he received his habilitation at the University of Cologne, which appointed him associate professor a year later. He was chairman of the Cologne Medical Association and a member of the German Democratic Party.

== Nazi persecution ==
When the Nazis came to power in 1933, Meirowsky was persecuted because of his Jewish heritage. On November 24, 1933, his teaching license at the University of Cologne was revoked, in February 1936 his academic titles were revoked, and in 1938 he was forced to give up his practice. In 1939 he emigrated to England with his wife Clara and their 29-year-old son Arnold. From 1942 he worked at the Royal Surrey Hospital in Guilford. In 1946 he received an offer to return to teaching at Cologne University. After the war, when the Meirowsky couple learned that their daughter Lisamaria had been murdered in the Holocaust, the family decided never to return to Germany. On May 2, 1947, Emil Meirowsky emigrated to the United States with his wife and son. There he taught at Indiana University Medical School until 1953.

Meirowsky researched the origins of melanin. In 1906 he proved (in Unna's laboratory) that the epidermis can produce melanin. The Meirowsky phenomenon (1909), the tanning of the skin by high temperatures, is named after him. He also researched the life cycle of the syphilis pathogen and the etiology of moles and congenital malformations of the skin. Meirowsky also discovered the viral etiology of psoriasis.

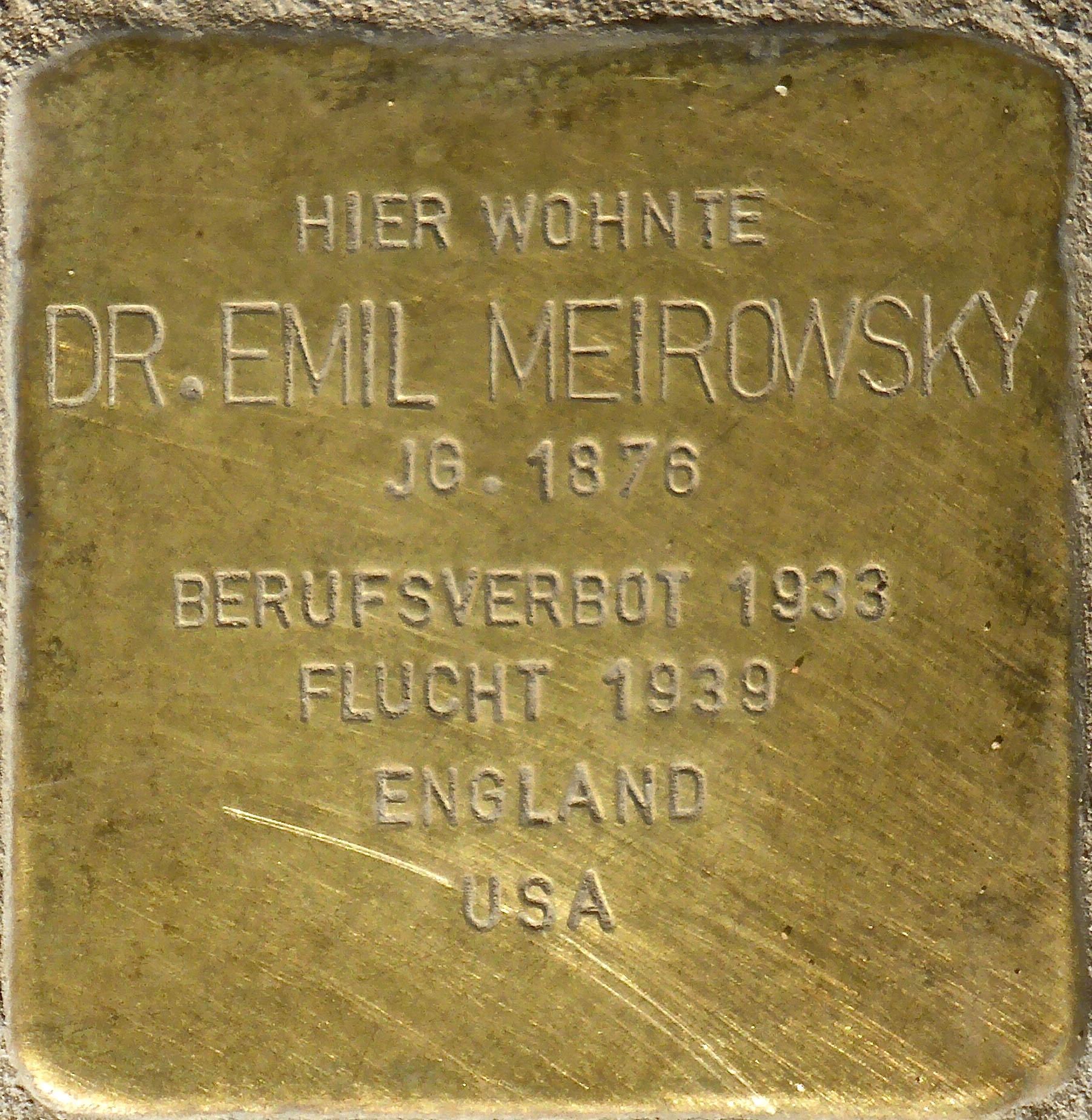
Stumbling block for Emil Meirowsky in Cologne-Lindenthal

His daughter Lisamaria Meirowsky was also a doctor and was murdered in the Auschwitz-Birkenau concentration camp. His youngest son Arnold became a renowned neurosurgeon in the United States, and his oldest son, Werner Leopold (1907–1994), emigrated to England. Werner helped his parents escape the Nazi persecution and took the name William Merrow. In England, he worked in business and built the successful multilingual recruitment company: Merrow Language Recruitment, he also worked as an actor after World War II. His daughter, Emil's granddaughter, is the actress Jane Merrow. Emil's brother was the entrepreneur and art collector Max Meirowsky.

In March 2015, a commemorative stumbling stone was laid in front of his last residence in Cologne-Lindenthal, Fürst-Pückler-Strasse 42, in his memory as part of the art and memorial project by Cologne artist Gunter Demnig.

== Publications (selection) ==
- Über den Ursprung des melanotischen Pigments der Haut und des Auges, Leipzig 1908
- Geschlechtsleben der Jugend, Schule und Elternhaus, Leipzig 1913
- Studien über die Fortpflanzung von Bakterien, Spirillen und Spirochäten, Berlin 1914
- Über die Entstehung der sogenannten kongenitalen Missbildungen der Haut, Wien & Leipzig 1919
- Bericht der Salvarsankommission des Allgemeinen Aerztlichen Vereins in Köln. In: Münchener medizinische Wochenschrift. Band 67, 1920, S. 477–480.
- Tierzeichnung, Menschenscheckung und Systematisation der Muttermäler: ein Beitrag zur vergleichenden Morphologie der Haut, Berlin 1921 (mit Leonhard Leven)
- Hautkrankheiten, Leipzig 1924/1930
- Geschlechts-Krankheiten, Leipzig 192/ 1931

== Literature ==
- Joseph Walk (Hrsg.): Kurzbiographien zur Geschichte der Juden 1918–1945. hrsg. vom Leo Baeck Institute, Jerusalem. Saur, München 1988, ISBN 3-598-10477-4.
- Christoph Löser, Gerd Plewig (Hrsg.): Pantheon der Dermatologie: Herausragende historische Persönlichkeiten. Springer, Heidelberg 2008, S. 677 ff., ISBN 978-3-540-34090-4.
