= Erik Borgman =

Dutch theologian

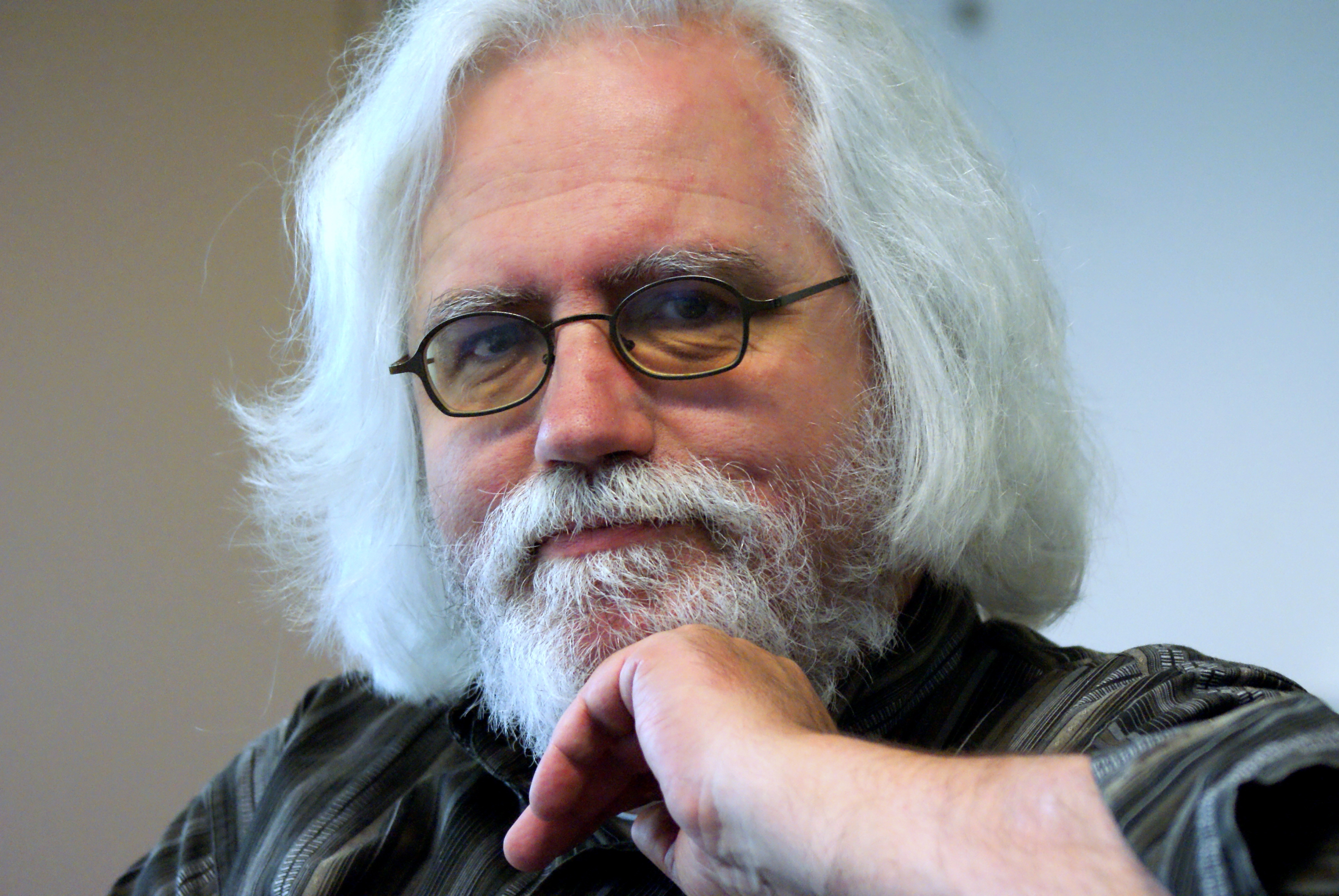
Professor Erik Borgman, a Dutch Roman Catholic theologian at Tilburg University.

Professor Erik Borgman (born 1957, Amsterdam) (sometimes listed as Eric Borgman) is a Dutch professor of systematic theology at the University of Tilburg, the Netherlands. At the Radboud University Nijmegen, the Netherlands, he was the Director of the Heyendaal Institute, an institute for interdisciplinary research. He is the biographer of the Flemish theologian Edward Schillebeeckx. He was also the President of the International Society for Religion, Literature and Culture. He is a member of the Editorial Board and the Presidential Board of Concilium: International Journal for Theology, also an editor of the Dutch Tijdschrift voor Theologie and member of the Third Order of Saint Dominic. He studied philosophy and theology at the University of Nijmegen. He wrote a dissertation on the different forms of Liberation Theology and their relation to academic Western theology (1990).

== Partial list of books ==
- Alexamenos aanbidt zijn God: Theologische essays voor sceptische lezers (Zoetermeer 1994)
- Edward Schillebeeckx: A Theologian in His History, Vol. I: A Catholic Theology of Culture (London/New York 2003)
- Literary Canons and Religious Identity
- Sporen van de bevrijdende God (Kampen 1990)
- Dominican Spirituality: An Exploration (London/New York 2002)
- Metamorfosen: Over religie en moderne cultuur
- ...want de grond waarop je staat is heilige grond: God als onderzoeksprogramma
- Overlopen naar de barbaren, het publieke belang van religie en christendom (Klement/Peckmans - ISBN 978-90-8687-052-3)
