= Louise Nicolle =

French social activist (1847 - 1889)

Servant of God Louise Nicolle TOSD
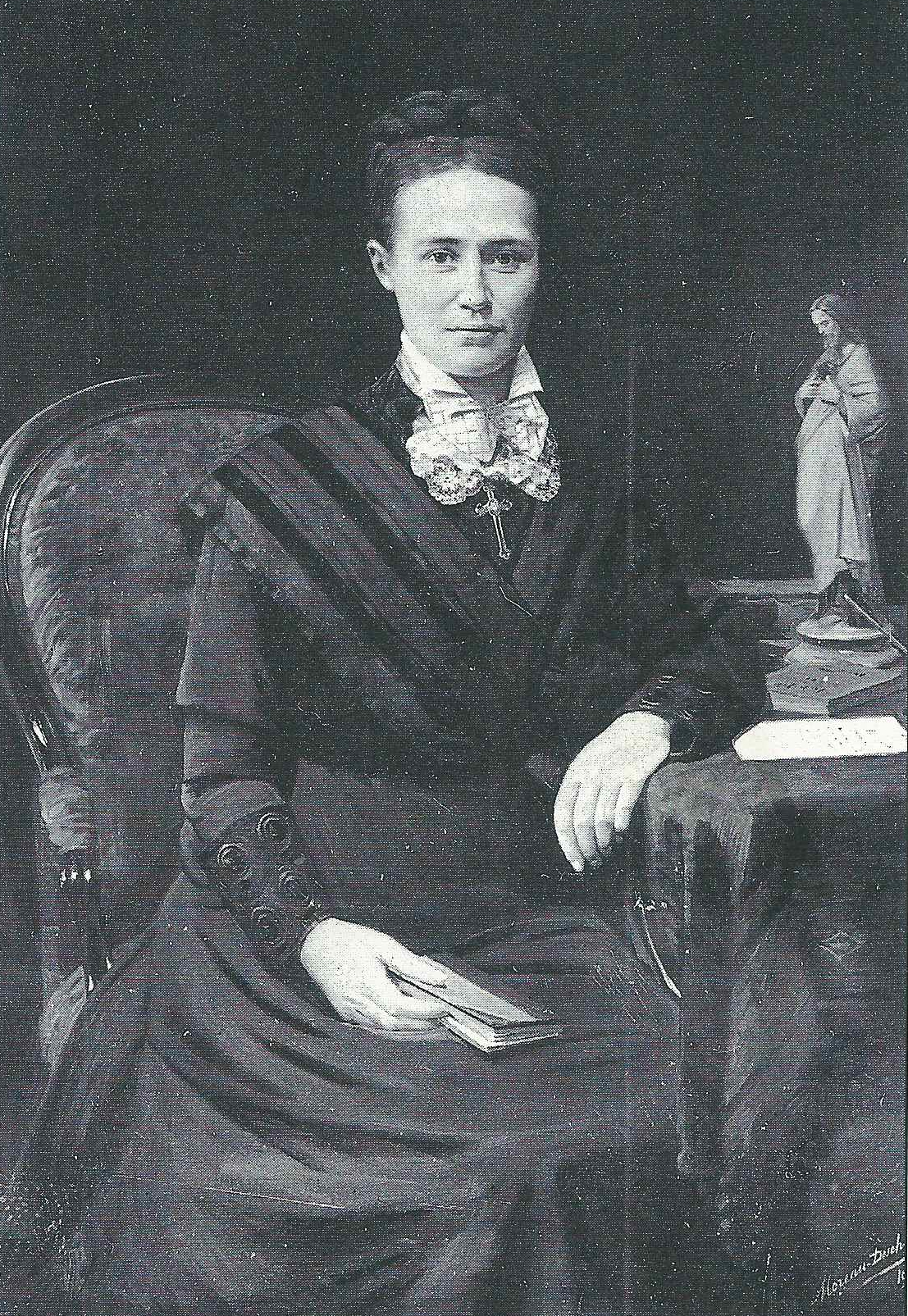
- Born: 9 June 1847; Saint-Amand-les-Eaux, Nord, France
- Died: 1 August 1889 (aged 42); Saint-Amand-les-Eaux, Nord, France

Louise Nicolle (9 June 1847 – 1 August 1889) was a French Catholic lay woman of bourgeois origins who devoted her life to social works particularly to the poor and women in Nord.

== Biography ==
=== Early life ===
Nicolle was born 9 June 1847 in Saint-Amand-les-Eaux, Nord to a bourgeois family, wherein her father, Louis Joseph Nicolle, was a former commander of the National Guard and deputy mayor.

At the age of 20, she desired to become a nun and entered the Bernardine Cistercians of Esquermes, but left due to fragile health. Unable to qualify for religious life, she decided to remain a lay person and joined the lay Dominicans.

=== Social works ===
In 1867, encouraged by the Prior of the Dominicans in Lille, she established her first patronage and social work focusing on the homeless and women in industrial areas. In 1869, Pope Pius IX encouraged her and gave his blessings on her ministries. She took advantage of her social status in order to gain support from influential figures in creating dignified work for women and opportunities for girls.

In 1888, Nicolle, together with all the women volunteers in her social works, received authorization from the Archbishop of Cambrai, François-Edouard Hasley, to form a congregation. She named it as the Humble Daughters of the Sacred Heart of Saint-Amand. Currently, it is now part of the Secular Institute of Saint Dominic.

=== Death ===
On 1 August 1889, Nicolle died at the age of 42 due to tuberculosis.

A chapel was built in her honor in Saint-Amand-les-Eaux which housed Nicolle's remains 1948 to 2021. In 2021, the chapel having been deconsecrated and put up for sale, her remains were transferred to her family's vault in the Saint-Amand-les-Eaux Communal Cemetery.

== Beatification ==
On 19 May 1939, Archbishop Jean-Arthur Chollet of the Roman Catholic Archdiocese of Cambrai opened the Nicolle's beatification cause. Up to date, her cause remains without progress.
