= Teodora Fracasso =

Italian Catholic nun

Blessed Elia of Saint Clement O.C.D.
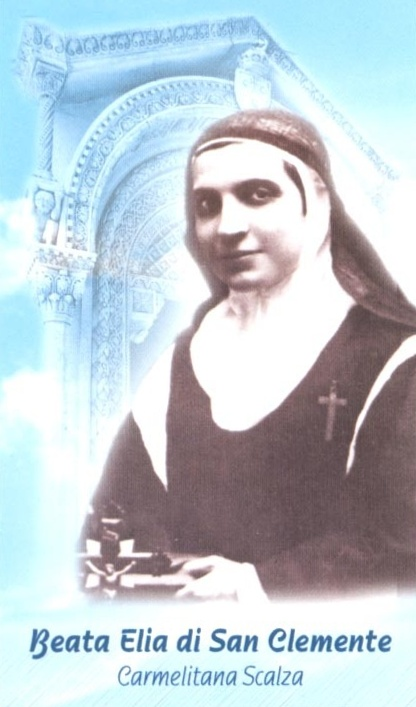

Religious
- Born: Teodora Fracasso; 17 January 1901; Bari, Kingdom of Italy
- Died: 25 December 1927 (aged 26); Bari, Kingdom of Italy
- Venerated in: Roman Catholic Church
- Beatified: 18 March 2006, Bari Cathedral, Bari, Italy by Cardinal José Saraiva Martins
- Feast: 29 May
- Attributes: Religious habit
- Influences: Saint Thérèse of Lisieux

Teodora Fracasso, OCD (17 January 1901 - 25 December 1927) - in religion, Elia di San Clemente - was an Italian Catholic nun in the Carmelites. Fracasso once had the name of "Agnes" during a stint in the Third Order of Saint Dominic. Fracasso's inclinations to become a nun stemmed from her childhood after having had a vision in 1911 in which Thérèse of Lisieux told her that she would become a nun; this realization came a decade later when she entered the convent in her native Bari where she remained for the remainder of her life.

Her beatification cause was opened on 11 September 1980 and she became titled as a Servant of God when the cause commenced and this led to the confirmation of her heroic virtue which allowed for Pope John Paul II to name her as Venerable. Pope Benedict XVI later approved her beatification which Cardinal José Saraiva Martins presided over on 18 March 2006 on the pope's behalf in the Bari Cathedral.

== Life ==
Teodora Fracasso was born on 17 January 1901 in Bari as the third of nine children (four died as infants) to Giuseppe Fracasso and Pasqua Cianci; she received her baptism on 21 January in the San Giacomo parish church from her paternal uncle Carlo Fracasso. Fracasso had at least four sisters; her elder sisters were Prudence and Anna and her little sisters were Teodora Domenica and Nicola. Her father worked as a painter and decorator while her mother was a housewife. Fracasso received her Confirmation in 1903 from the Archbishop of Bari-Bitonto Giulio Vaccaro.

In 1906 she claimed to have seen a beautiful woman in a dream moving among rows of blooming lilies who then disappeared in a sudden beam of light. Fracasso received her education as a child from the Stigmata Sisters and she studied at school until the third grade. In 1905 her parents decided it was time to relocate from their home in Saint Mark's Square to Via Piccinni into a little house with a little garden.

On the night before her First Communion - which was celebrated on 11 May 1911 - she had a dream of Thérèse of Lisieux who told her: "You will be a nun like me". She entered the association of Imelda Lambertini and became a member of the "Esercito Angelico" of Thomas Aquinas. Her spiritual director and confessor at this stage was the Dominican priest Pietro Fiorillo who introduced her to the charism of the Third Order of Saint Dominic; she was accepted into it on 20 April 1914 and assumed the religious name of "Agnes" upon making her vows on 14 May 1915.

In late 1917 she sought advice from her confessor - the Jesuit Sergio di Gioia (her new spiritual director) - who in 1918 directed her and her friend Clara Bellomi to the Saint Joseph convent of the Carmelites in Bari. On 8 April 1920 she joined the congregation there while taking the religious name of "Elia di San Clemente" upon assuming the habit on that 14 November. Fracasso made her initial vows on 4 December 1921 and later made her solemn profession of vows on 11 February 1925. In the spring of 1923 the prioress Angelica Lamberti put her in charge of the embroider machine at the girl's boarding school but the authoritarian and strict head mistress of the school removed her from that position in 1925. But Lamberti held her in high esteem and in 1927 named her as the sacristan. From 1922 she became close with Father Elia di San Ambrogio and the two often corresponded.

From 1926 she began to suffer from the effects of encephalitis. Fracasso came down with a bad case of influenza in January 1927 and her illness became worse over a rapid period of time which included frequent headaches that she never took medication for. On 21 December she suffered from a high fever. On 24 December a doctor was summoned and diagnosed her with possible meningitis or encephalitis not deemed to be serious. But on Christmas morning two doctors were summoned and declared she had an irreversible brain tumor far too advanced to heal. Fracasso died at noon on 25 December 1927 - Christmas - from a brain tumor; she had predicted that she would die on an important feast. Archbishop Augusto Curi presided over her funeral on 26 December.

== Beatification ==
The beatification process opened in the Bari-Bitonto archdiocese in an informative process that Archbishop Enrico Nicodemo oversaw from 27 October 1953 until the process' closure on 9 May 1955; theologians collected and examined her spiritual writings and approved them all on 1 July 1964 as being in line with official doctrine and not in contravention of it. The formal introduction to her cause for sainthood came on 11 September 1980 and Fracasso became titled as a Servant of God as a result. Archbishop Andrea Mariano Magrassi oversaw the apostolic process from 1981 to 1982 while all documentation was sent to the Congregation for the Causes of Saints in Rome who validated both processes on 23 November 1984. Officials for the cause compiled and sent the Positio dossier to the C.C.S. in 1987 for investigation; theologians approved this on 7 July 1987 as did the C.C.S. on 17 November 1987. Fracasso was titled as Venerable on 11 December 1987 after Pope John Paul II confirmed that the late religious had led a life of heroic virtue.

One miracle needed to be approved for her to be beatified; one such case was investigated and the diocesan process received C.C.S. validation on 1 October 2004 before a medical panel of experts approved it on 9 December 2004. Theologians likewise approved this on 7 February 2005 as did the C.C.S. on 15 March 2005. Pope Benedict XVI approved this miracle on 19 December 2005 which therefore meant the beatification would occur; Cardinal José Saraiva Martins presided over the beatification on the pope's behalf on 18 March 2006 in the Bari Cathedral.

The current postulator for this cause is Romano Gambalunga.
