= Giovanna da Orvieto =

Historical Italian Dominican tertiary

Blessed Giovanna da Orvieto TOSD
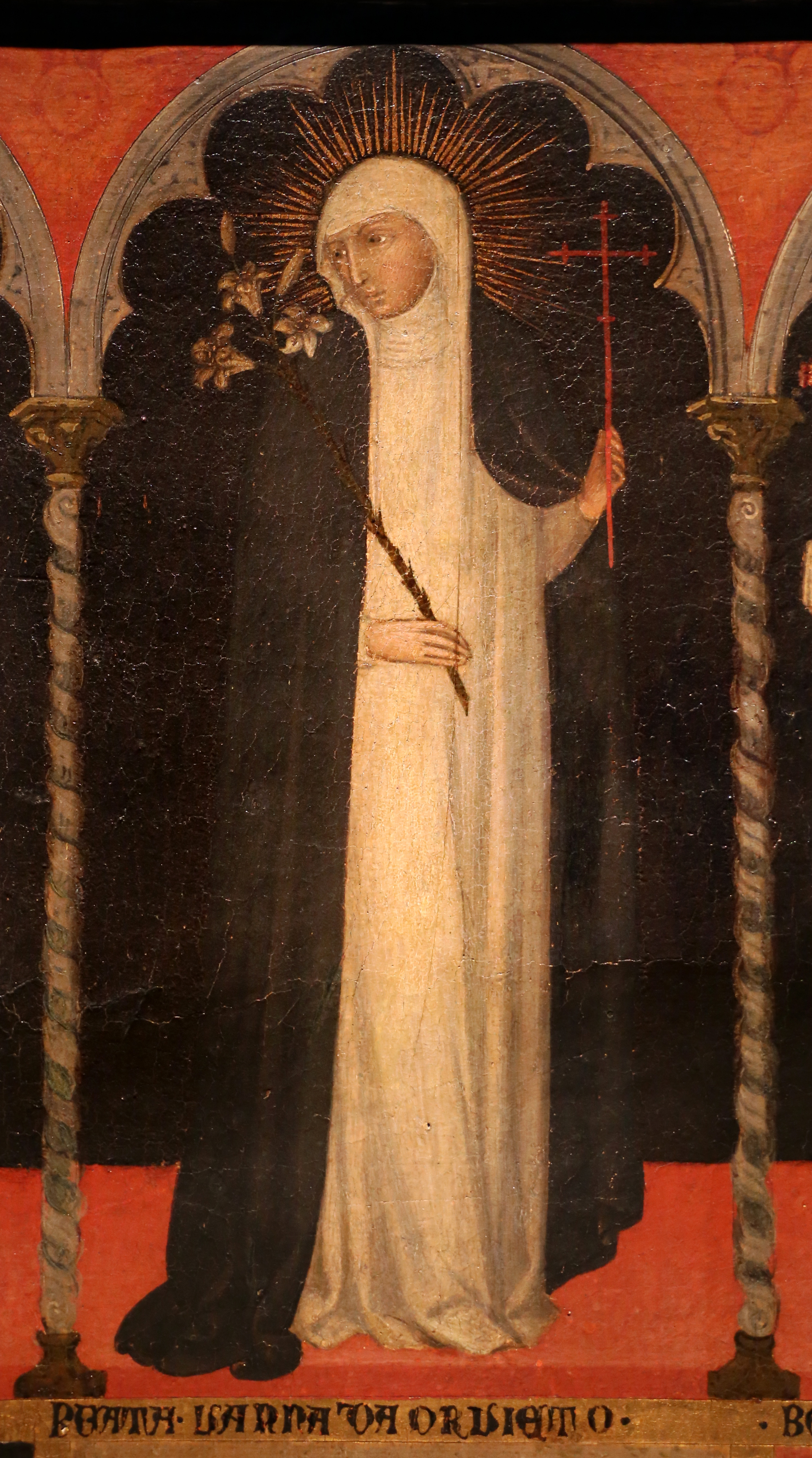
- Vanna da Orvieto (Detail from a painting of Andrea di Bartolo, showing Catherine of Siena among four blessed Dominicans and scenes from their lives)

Virgin
- Born: 1264; Carnaiola, Umbria, Papal States
- Died: 23 July 1306 (aged 42); Orvieto, Papal States
- Venerated in: Roman Catholic Church
- Beatified: 11 September 1754, Saint Peter's Basilica by Pope Benedict XIV
- Feast: 23 July
- Attributes: Dominican habit, crucifix, white lilies

Giovanna da Orvieto (1264 - 23 July 1306) was an Italian Dominican tertiary. She was known for her wise intellect and for her intense devotion to serving the will of God while being noted for being prone to ecstasies and other visions. Pope Benedict XIV beatified her in 1754.

== Life ==
Giovanna da Orvieto was born in the Umbria province in 1264. She was orphaned at the age of five. Other relatives took care of her following the deaths of her parents. As she grew older, she began to visit a seamstress so as to learn a trade and not be a burden on her relatives. She worked as both a seamstress and embroiderer and during her adolescence refused prospects of marriage to instead focus on her call to the religious life.

Very religious, she was convinced that virginity would lead to a more perfect spiritual life, she decided to take a vow of perpetual chastity. Nonetheless, her relatives arranged a marriage for her against her will. She fled to Orvieto and entered domestic service with a Dominican tertiary named Ghisla. Giovanna decided to follow the Dominican path of spirituality and around age twenty joined that order and received the habit of a tertiary. In the last decade of her life she reportedly received a range of ecstatic visions.

Giovanna died in 1306. Originally buried in the church of San Domenico, her remains were later moved on 18 November 1307 to a suitable sarcophagus and then transferred on two more occasions in 1610 and on 4 May 1743 for the final time.

== Beatification ==
The request for a prompt beatification was made to Pope Benedict XIII in 1728 but it was not until 11 September 1754 that Pope Benedict XIV issued a decree that confirmed Giovanna's popular veneration and thus approved of her beatification.

Giovanna is held as the patron of both seamstresses and embroiders while Pope Pius XI later made her the patron of all Italian working women in 1926.
