= Max Meirowsky =

German Jewish industrialist

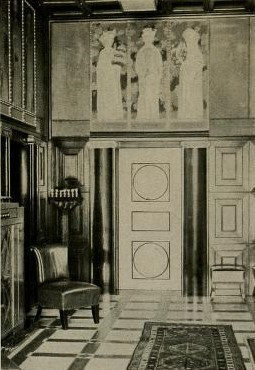
Hall in the house of Max Meirowsky in Cologne-Lindenthal. With a tapestry by Fritz Erler (1909)

Max Meirowsky (born 17 February 1866 in Guttstadt; died 1 December 1949 in Geneva) was a German-Jewish industrialist and art collector persecuted by the Nazis.

== Life ==
Max Meirowsky, the older brother of the dermatologist Emil Meirowsky (1876–1960), came to Cologne from East Prussia. In 1894 he founded a company near Porz to produce insulating material (mica, monazite and feldspar) for the emerging electrical and motor industries. The company flourished, and in 1910 was transformed into a family corporation, Meirowsky AG, in which Max's brother Emil also participated.

He lived in Lindenthal, Cologne, in a house constructed by architect Ludwig Bopp in 1910–11. In 1917 Meirowsky anonymously donated 1.2 million gold marks to the city of Cologne, in the hope of advancing research into improving children's nutrition, however the mayor Konrad Adenauer wanted to use the money to "attract a Kaiser Wilhelm Institute to his city". Meirowsky raised the donation to three million gold market in 1919, but war, inflation and other problems hampered plans.

He married Amélie Paula Feldsieger, née Felsch. They divorced on October 28, 1938.

== Art collector ==
Meirowsky's art collection included works by van Gogh, Renoir, Monet, Gauguin, Pissarro and Hodler. He had a fine collection of Impressionism and Post-Impressionism, including Van Gogh’s "Portrait of Camille Roulin" (1888) (now in the Museo de Arte, São Paulo). In 1913 he purchased Van Gogh's Wheatstacks, a painting that would pass through many hands, including another Jewish art collector, Alexandrine de Rothschild (1884–1965), before suddenly resurfacing at Christie’s New York "following complex behind-the-scenes deal" in 2021.

In 1912 Meirowsky was honored, along with others, for his promotion of the Sonderbund International Art Exhibition in Cologne. In 1929, Meirowsky contributed art works to another exhibition organized by Alfred Flechtheim.

== Nazi persecution, loss and exile ==
When the Nazis came to power in 1933, Max's brother Emil, who had become a professor of dermatology at the University of Cologne in 1921, was fired from his position at the university because Jewish. Like other Jewish doctors, his licence to practice medicine was revoked, because he was Jewish, in 1936. In 1939 Emil escaped to the United States via England. However Emil's daughter, Lisamaria (1904–1942) who had graduated with a double doctorate in medicine, did not escape. Despite efforts to convert to Christianity, she was deported to Auschwitz and murdered because of her Jewish origins. "Apart from her dissertation there are no other traces of her existence".

In 1938 Max's company, Meirowsky AG, was Aryanized by the Nazis. His property Waldstraße 22/28 in Berlin-Reinickendorf was subject to a forced sale to Norddeutsche Dornier-Werke Wismar in 1938.

To finance his flight, he was forced to sell his art collection at a "Jewish auction" on November 18, 1938, at the Berlin auction house H. W. Lange. A version of Ferdinand Hodler's Lied aus der Ferne from 1914 was also sold for 2800 Reichsmark.

The Aryanized company, now with no Jewish owners, became Dielektra AG in 1941. Sold in 1982 it joined the Siemens group in 1990. Until January 2006 Dielekra AG operated as a limited liability company (GmbH).

Some of the paintings that were once in Max Meirowsky's art collection can be seen in Brigitte Monti's Max Meirowsky: Industriel, Collectionneur, Emigrant pages 65–81.

In November 2021, a Van Gogh painting that had belonged to Meirowsky, Meules de blé (1888), sold for $35 million at a Christies' auction after a three party restitution agreement involving the heirs of Max Meirowsky, Alexandrine de Rothschild, and representatives for Cox’s estate.

== Literature ==
- Lothar Jaenicke und Frieder W. Lichtenthaler: Ein Kaiser-Wilhelm-Institut für Köln : Emil Fischer, Konrad Adenauer und die Meirowsky-Stiftung, in: Angewandte Chemie, Volume 115, Issue 7, 17. Februar 2003, S. 746–750.

== See also ==
- Aryanization
- Sonderbund westdeutscher Kunstfreunde und Künstler
- List of claims for restitution
