= Alberto da Bergamo =

Blessed Alberto da Bergamo TOSD
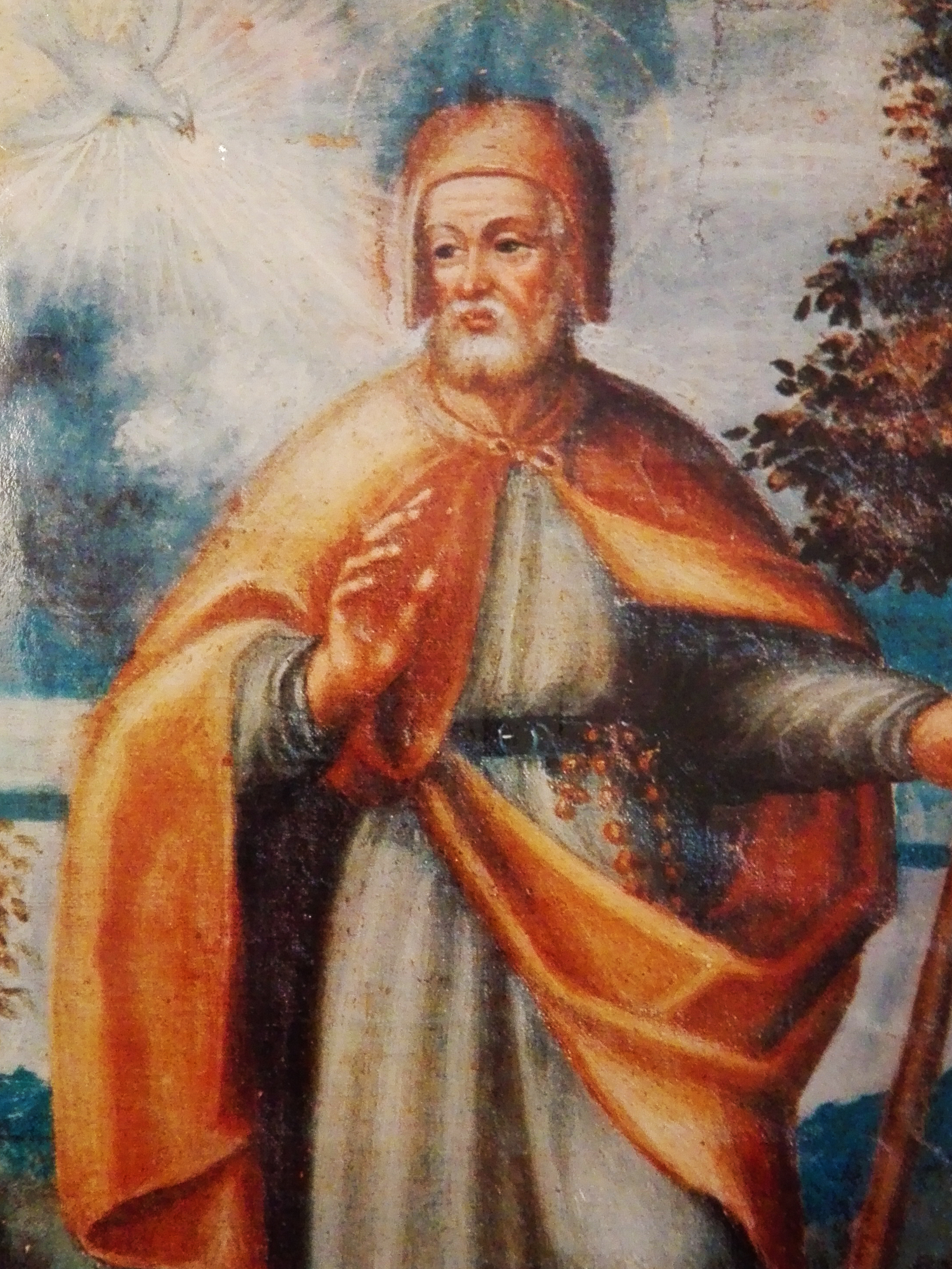
- Born: 1214; Villa d'Ogna, Bergamo, Commune of Milan
- Died: 7 May 1279 (aged 65); Cremona, Commune of Milan
- Venerated in: Roman Catholic Church
- Beatified: 9 May 1748, Saint Peter's Basilica, Papal States by Pope Benedict XIV
- Feast: 7 May, 11 May (Dominicans)
- Attributes: religious habit of a Dominican terciary, dove

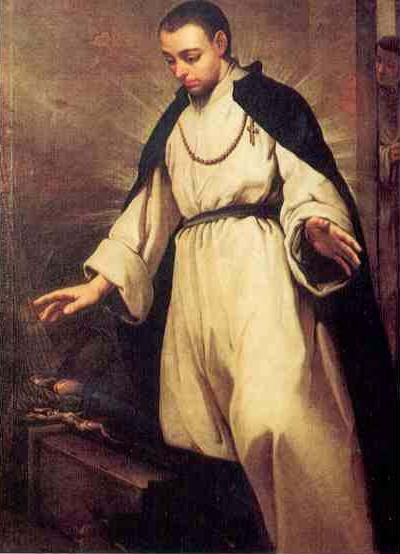
Painting from c. 1700

Alberto da Bergamo, TOSD (1214 – 7 May 1279) was an Italian Catholic farmer from Bergamo and a professed member of the Third Order of Saint Dominic. He was married in his adulthood to a wife who disapproved of his generous nature to the poor before her conversion and death, and he spent his initial widowhood going on several pilgrimages to Rome as well as visits to both Spain and Jerusalem.

He was beatified in 1748 after Pope Benedict XIV confirmed that there existed a longstanding local 'cultus' - or popular devotion - to the late farmer.

== Life ==
Alberto da Bergamo was born in Bergamo in 1214 to modest and pious farmers. From aged seven he began fasting for half a week and foregone all the food he did not have during that time to the poor.

He maintained his father's farm in Villa d'Ogna after following his father's pious and industrious example and he later married. His father had also taught him penitential practices that later fructified in his son's life. Alberto's wife made no initial objections to his generous example and his giving to the poor but the death of her father-in-law saw her begin to criticize his work. She soon ceased her nagging and in a sudden conversion began to follow his example though she later died not long after - the couple were childless. His parents and wife died sometime between 1240 and 1255. He gained a formidable reputation as one who dedicated his life to aiding the poor in whatever manner was available. He travelled on nine pilgrimages to Rome and also made eight visits to Santiago de Compostela and one to Jerusalem. While in Rome he manifested his obedience to the pontiffs of the times that he visited such as Pope Celestine IV and Pope Alexander IV. He would also visit the hospitals of Rome to comfort the ill and to encourage them to confess their sins. The farmer later settled in Cremona in order to continue his farming and arrived there at harvest time working in the fields with the moniker of "the diligent worker". Alberto worked twice as harder as was expected of a man and received twice as much in wages as a result of this. Jealous companions also sought to curb this with planting iron in his fields so that he would damage his tools though this failed. He often liked to walk along chanting Psalms; he also often recited the Divine Office.

He became a professed member of the Third Order of Saint Dominic in 1256 after meeting them at that time. He helped to aid the priests of the order in Cremona and volunteered to work in their garden.

In 1279 he fell ill and sent a neighbor for a priest but a long period followed in which the neighbor failed to return with a priest. The stories suggest that a dove came to him bringing the Viaticum. It was also said after his death the bells of Cremona rang on their own. The people decided to inter him in a simple plot but no spade could break the ground so he was interred in the church of Saint Matthias where the late farmer often visited.

== Beatification ==
Da Bergamo's beatification received official confirmation from Pope Benedict XIV on 9 May 1748, after the pontiff confirmed that there was a longstanding veneration.
