= Maria Bagnesi =

Blessed Maria Bartolomea Bagnesi TOSD
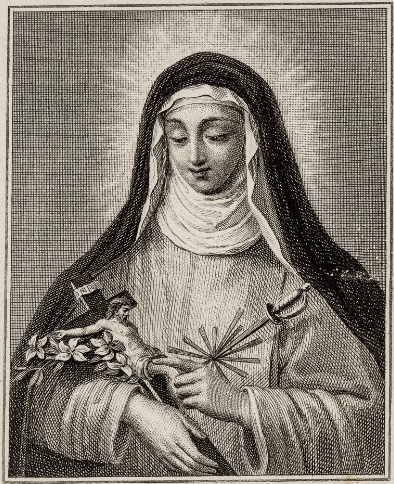
- 1804 lithograph of the Dominican Blessed

Virgin
- Born: 15 August 1514; Florence, Republic of Florence
- Died: 28 May 1577 (aged 62); Florence, Duchy of Florence
- Venerated in: Roman Catholic Church
- Beatified: 11 July 1804, Saint Peter's Basilica, Papal States by Pope Pius VII
- Feast: 28 May
- Attributes: Dominican habit; Crucifix; Dagger

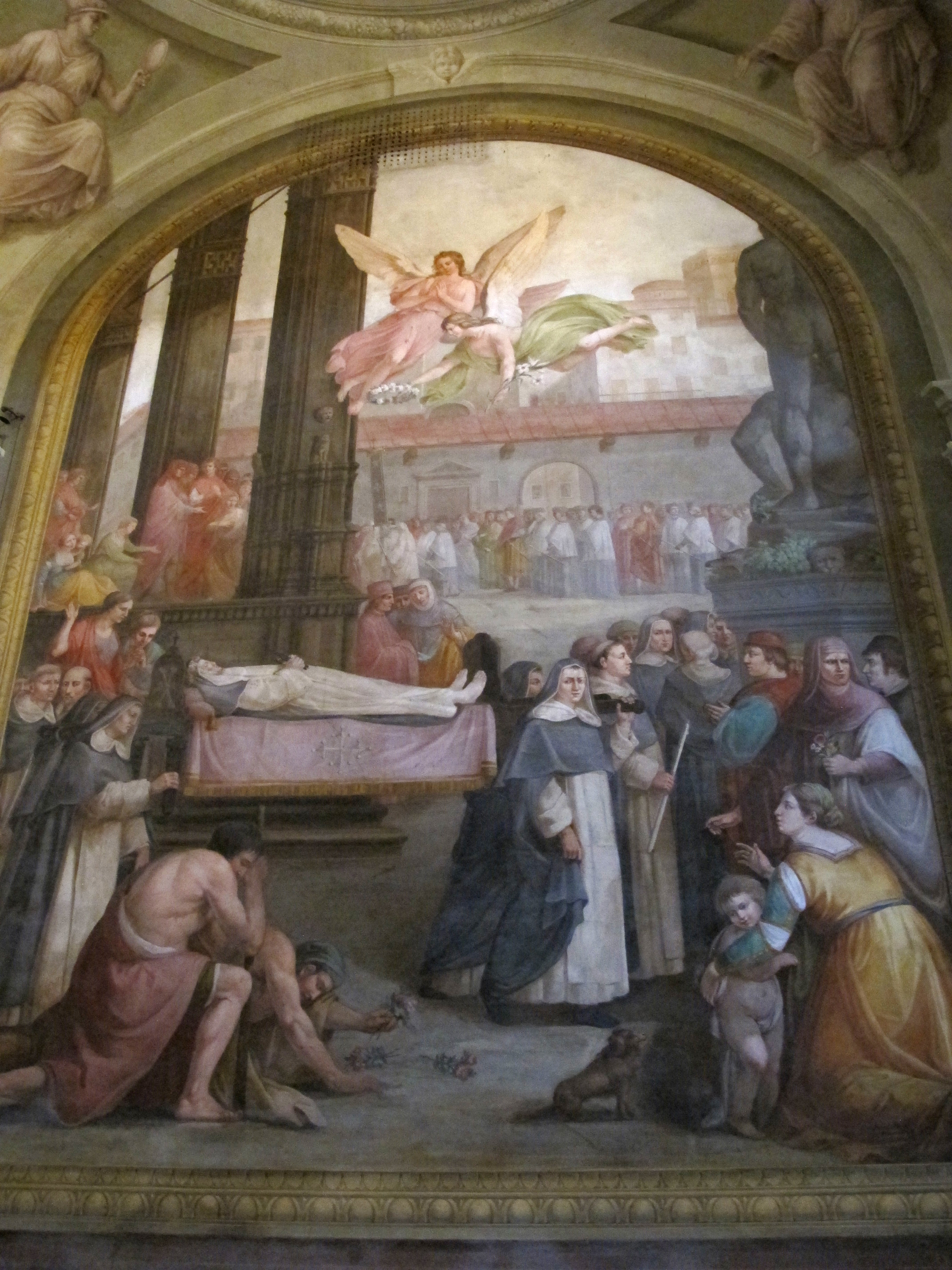
Painting depicting Bagnesi's funeral

Maria Bagnesi, TOSD (15 August 1514 – 28 May 1577) was an Italian Catholic professed member of the Third Order of Saint Dominic. Bagnesi remained confined to her bed for most of her life after falling ill upon receiving news that her father arranged a marriage for her – she escaped this fate but remained in her room where people flocked to seek her counsel. Due to her devotion to Bartholomew the Apostle, she assumed the religious name Maria Bartolomea. Pope Pius VII beatified her in 1804.

== Life ==
Maria Bagnesi was born in Florence on 15 August 1514, the Feast of the Assumption, to Carlo Bagnesi and Alessandra Orlandini. Bagnesi was a neglected child and her mother often left her in the care of others which included one of Bagnesi's sisters who was a nun from the Order of Preachers so she spent most of her childhood in her sister's convent. Four of her sisters would end up in the religious life.

Her father organized a marriage for her when she turned seventeen and she fainted in horror upon learning this. The thought made Bagnesi so ill she could not walk and was thus confined to her bed. Her father turned to con men and charlatans – for he could be manipulated with ease — and put his daughter through over three decades of non-stop "treatment". Being bedridden meant that she could not follow her sisters into the religious life but she nevertheless became a member of the Third Order of Saint Dominic in 1544 and made her profession in 1545; she made her vows into the hands of and received the habit from Vittorio di Mattheo who allowed for this to take place in Bagnesi's room. After she professed she found that she could get out of her bed for brief periods of time. The combination of asthma and these quack treatments immobilized her just as she began to heal and she started to have visions and converse with angels and demons alike. Neighbors began to believe she was under demonic possession and summoned a local priest who became her spiritual director. He assured the locals Bagnesi was not possessed or in need of an exorcism. People also claimed to have seen her levitate. She was also granted the special privilege of having Mass celebrated in her room at times.

Her room soon became a place for pilgrims to go to in order to seek her wisdom and counsel and her room became a place for cats to roam – some remained with her and even slept on her bed while guarding her pet songbirds. Bagnesi developed a deep devotion to Saint Bartholomew the Apostle and she assumed the religious name Maria Bartholomea. She also came to know Mary Magdalene de' Pazzi and shared her visions with her; the saint would herself be cured due to Bagnesi's intercession on 16 June 1584. Bagnesi received the Eucharist three to six times a week and prepared beforehand with docile care and spent the time following her reception of it in deep reflection. Her confessors were the priests Alessandro Capocchi and Agostino Campi.

Bagnesi died in Florence in 1577 and at the end of her life five priests present at her deathbed read to her the Passion of Jesus Christ. Her remains were taken in procession for her funeral from Santa Maria Novella to Church of St. Mary of the Angels, Florence where she was interred. Her remains were putatively incorrupt.

== Beatification ==
Ferdinando Bagnesi, a descendant of Maria, sought to promote his illustrious ancestor for beatfication by writing a biography, probably motivated by the social prestige this would bring. About 60 years later, Maria Bagnesi's popular devotion received confirmation on 11 July 1804, allowing for Pope Pius VII to approve her beatification. Her liturgical feast is celebrated on the date of her death.
