= Columba Schonath =

German Dominican lay sister and mystic

Servant of God Maria Columba Schonath OP
- Born: Maria Anna Schonath; 11 December 1730; Burgellern, Bamberg, Bavaria, Germany
- Died: 3 March 1787 (aged 56); Bamberg, Bavaria, Germany

Maria Columba Schonath (11 December 1730 – 3 March 1787) was a German member of the Order of Preachers, stigmatist and mystic. She belonged to the convent Heilig Grab in Bamberg. Her cause for beatification has been opened in 1999.

== Life ==
The daughter of Johann Georg Schonath, a miller, and Katharina Schonath was baptized with the name Maria Anna in the parish church in Scheßlitz. She attended school from the age of nine. From her earliest youth, she was very pious.

On May 27, 1753, Schonath was admitted as a lay sister to the convent of Heilig Grab ("Holy Sepulchre") in Bamberg. When she was invested, she was given the religious name Maria Columba, after Columba of Rieti.

Schonath made her religious vows on September 24, 1754. A year later, she began to suffer from unexplained illnesses and bouts of fever and she was attacked by ulcers. This meant great obstacles to her life in the monastery. She often lay confined to her bed. The only consolation she could get during her suffering was the contemplation of the Passion of Christ by looking at an old crucifix. In 1763, when she was said to have received the stigmata. The stigmatisation has been documented since December 1763. Mystical visions also occurred which exceeded her physical strength. On March 3, 1787, she died after spending 33 years in the monastery. She was buried in a side chapel of the monastery church.

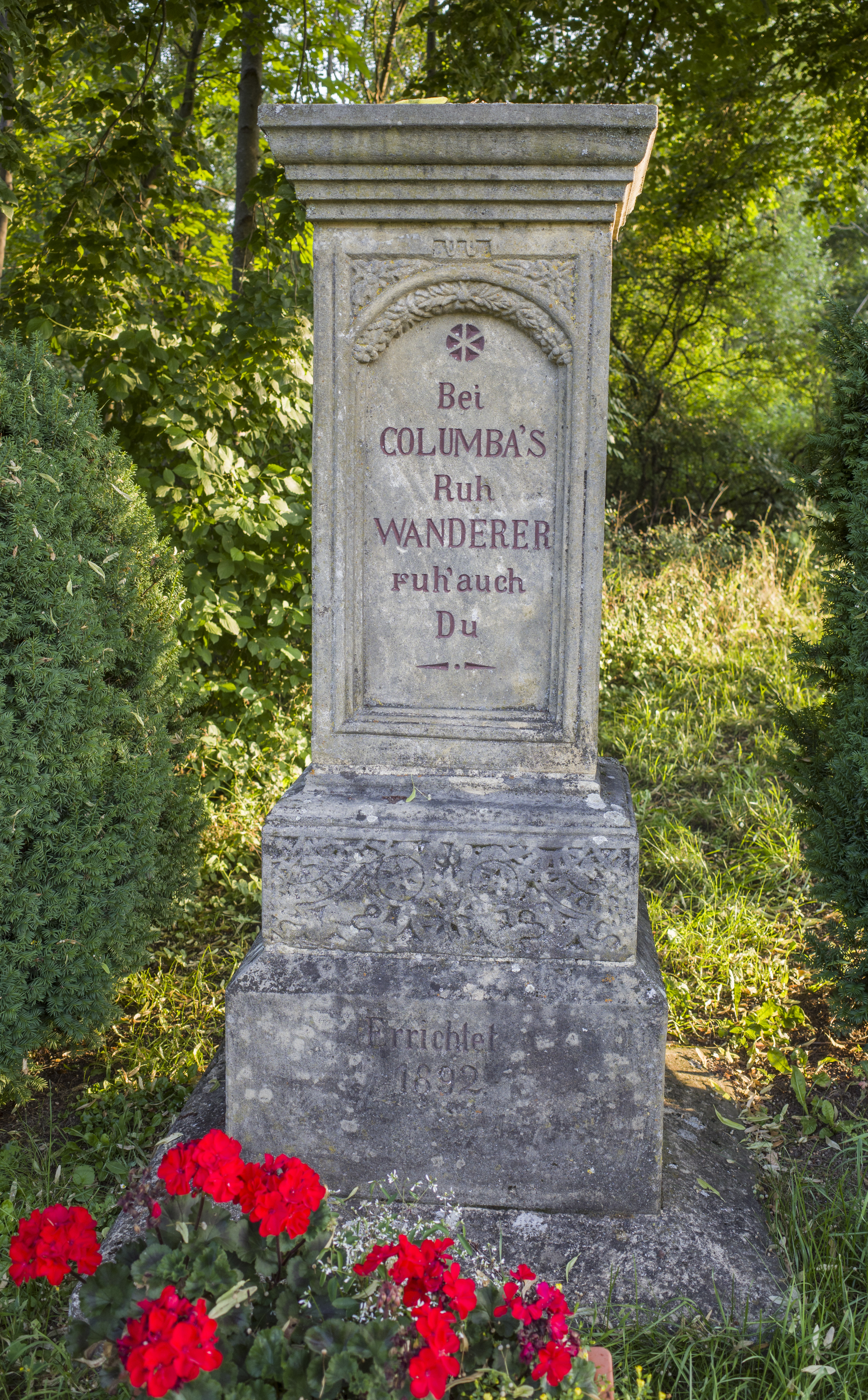
Memorial for Columba Schonath in Scheßlitz, erected in 1892

Because the monastery was dissolved in the course of secularization in 1803, Schonath's remains were transferred to the municipal cemetery and, after the monastery was resettled in 1926, back to the church.

== Beatification process ==
On 15 May 1999, Archbishop Karl Braun of Bamberg opened Schonath's beatification process on a diocesan level. Previous attempts had failed due to unfavorable circumstances at the time, such as the dissolution of the monastery. An archiepiscopal commission for beatification tries to advance the canonical process at diocesan level. The postulator in the beatification process is Reinhold Ortner.
