= Villana de' Botti =

Blessed Villana de' Botti TOSD
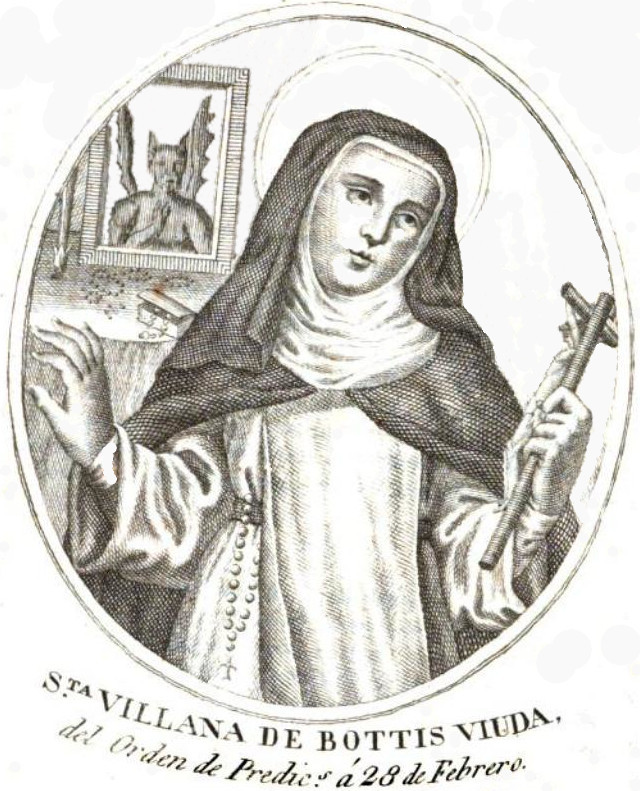

Virgin
- Born: 1332; Florence, Republic of Florence
- Died: 29 January 1361 (aged 28); Florence, Republic of Florence
- Venerated in: Roman Catholic Church
- Beatified: 27 March 1824, Saint Peter's Square, Vatican City by Pope Leo XII
- Feast: 29 January; 28 February (Dominicans)
- Attributes: Dominican habit

Villana de' Botti, TOSD (1332 - 29 January 1361) was an Italian Catholic member of the Third Order of Saint Dominic. She turned to the Dominicans after a sudden conversion from a dissolute adult life and was noted for her simplistic life born out of her conversion. She had been a pious and devoted child, but after marrying fell into secular values.

As a nun, de' Botti had fierce detractors due to her stating she had religious ecstasies at Mass, and these opponents eventually acknowledged her as a true living saint. She was beatified on 27 March 1824.

== Life ==
Villana de' Botti was born in Florence in 1332 to the merchant Andrea de' Botti.

De' Botti was a pious and devoted child who ran from home in 1345 in order to join a religious order at their convent. But the order she approached refused her and she was forced to return home to face the ire of her father. Her father decided to counter possible future attempts to join a convent when he decided to arrange his daughter's marriage to Rosso di Piero Benintendi in July 1351. But the rejection from the order she went to and her marriage changed the once-pious de' Botti who adopted a life of laziness and extravagance. But as she dressed in a gown of pearls and precious stones and prepared for an entertainment event she saw her reflection in the mirrors around her take the shape of demons as a reflection of her sin-laden soul. So she tore those clothes off in favour of something simple and wept as she fled to Santa Maria Novella and begged the priests of the Order of Preachers for their help while also making her confession.

The converted soul became a member of the Third Order of Saint Dominic and began to concentrate on her married life while spending her time reading Sacred Scripture (she was fond of the Epistles of Paul) and reading hagiographical accounts of saints. Her austerities as a sign of penance and her begging door to door concerned her husband and parents who had to stop her from continuing them. She also was given to religious ecstasies at the celebration of Mass but became the object of slander and ridicule - her detractors however realized in due course that she was a living saint.

De' Botti died in 1361 wearing the habit of the Dominicans and on her deathbed she asked that the Passion be read out to her; she died when the words "He bowed His head and gave up the Ghost" were read out. Her remains were taken to Santa Maria Novella but the priests were unable to inter her for a month due to the constant crowd of mourners. Her bereaved husband often said that when he felt discouraged or depressed, he would go to the room where his late wife died, for solace.

== Beatification ==
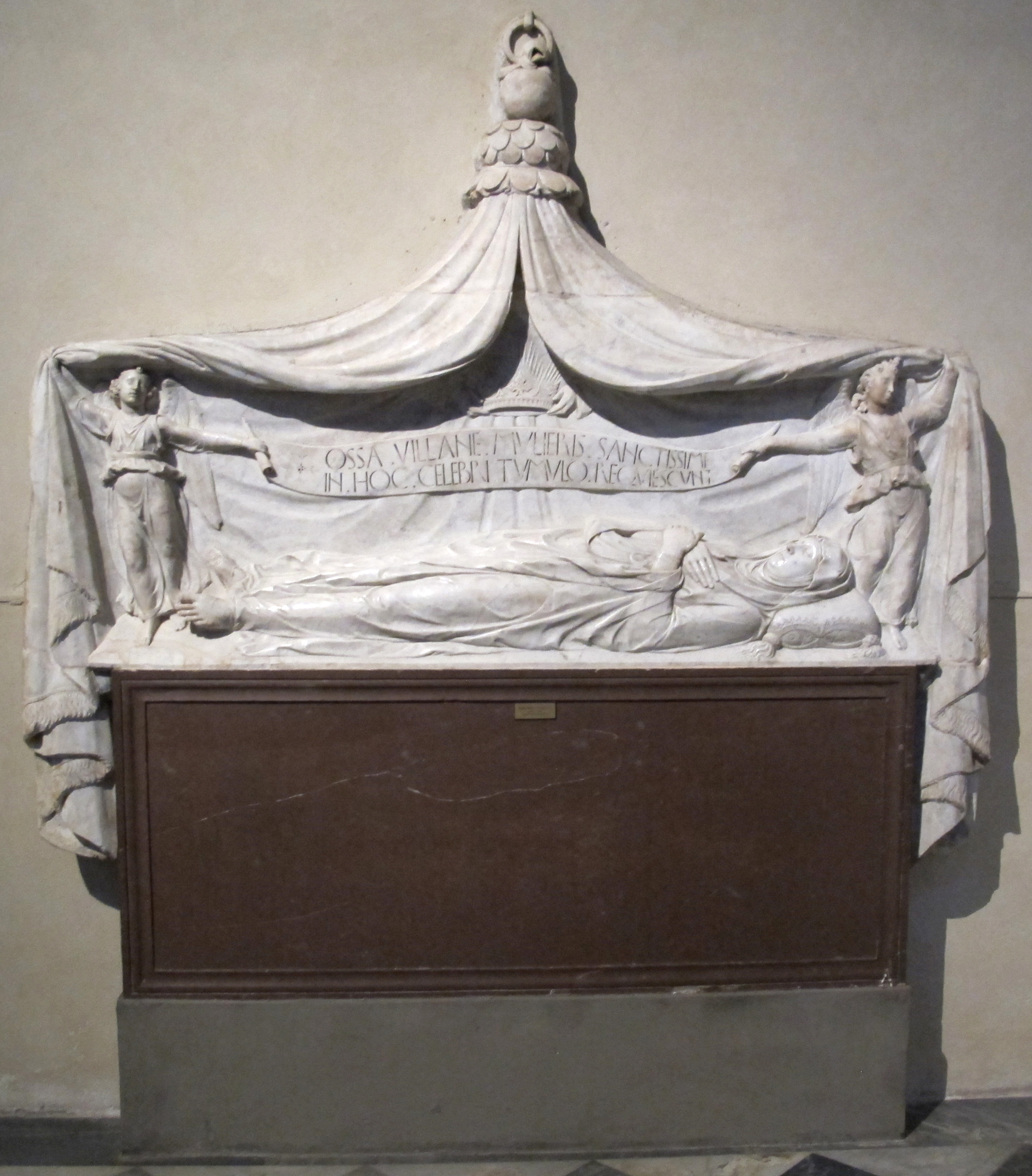
Tomb.

Shortly after de' Botti's death, she became the object of a strong local devotion, which prompted the author of her first biography, a descendant, to prematurely call her a beata. The confirmation of de' Botti's local 'cultus' on 27 March 1824 allowed for Pope Leo XII to grant his approval for her beatification.
