= Chronological list of saints and blesseds in the 15th century =

A list of people, who died during the 15th century, who have received recognition as Blessed (through beatification) or Saint (through canonization) from the Catholic Church:

Name	Birth	Birthplace	Death	Place of death	Notes
Blessed Andrea Franchi	1335		1401		Bishop of Pistoia
Blessed James of Lodi	1364		1404		
Blessed Jamess Strepa			1409		
Blessed Ursulina	1375		1410		
Daniel of Murano			1411		
Blessed Jeanne-Marie de Maille	1332		1414		
Vincent Ferrer	1350		1419		
Blessed Clare of Pisa	1362		1419		
Blessed John Dominici	1356		1419		
Lucy the Chaste			1420	Spain	followed St. Vincent Ferrer to Spain
Elizabeth the Good	1386		1420		
Blessed Lawrence Nerucci and Companions			1420		
Blessed Gonzalo of Lagos	1360		1422		
Paganus			1423		
Blessed Juliana of Norwich			1423		
Blessed Gemma of Sulmona	1364		1429		
Blessed Alvarez of Cordoba	1350		1430		
Joan of Arc	1412		1431		
Blessed Mary Mancini of Pisa	1350		1431		
Nuno Álvares Pereira	1360	Portugal	1431	Portugal	Portuguese general
Lidwina	1380		1433		
Blessed Angelina of Marsciano	1377		1435		
Blessed Peter of Pisa	1355		1435		
Blessed Angelo Augustine of Florence	1377		1438		
Blessed Ambrose of Camaldoli	1386		1439		
Frances of Rome	1384		1440		
Blessed Ferdinand of Portugal	1402		1443		
Blessed Nicholas Albergati	1375		1443		Bishop of Bologna
Bernardino of Siena	1380		1444		
Blessed Felicia of Milan	1378		1444		
Blessed Peter of Tiferno	1390		1445		
Colette	1381		1447		
Blessed Tommaso Bellacci			1447		
Blessed André Abellon	1375		1450		
Blessed Anthony of Amandola	1355		1450		
Blessed Matthew of Girgenti		Agrigento	1450	Palermo	Bishop of Girgenti
Blessed Stephen Bandelli	1369		1450		
Blessed Herculanus of Piegaro			1451		
Blessed Philippa de Chantemilian	1412		1451		
Blessed Pietro Geremia	1399		1452		
Blessed Pedro de Cerdena			1453		
Lorenzo Giustiniani			1455		Bishop of Venice
Blessed Jerome Ranuzzi			1455		
Agostina (Cristina) Camozzi (of Spoleto)	1435		1456		
Gabriel Ferretti (of Ancona)	1385		1456		
John of Capistrano	1386		1456		
Peter de Regalado	1390		1456		
Rita of Cascia	1381		1457		
Blessed Bonne d'Armagnac	1434		1457		
Blessed Lorenzo da Ripafratta	1359		1457		novice master of Peter of Tiferno and Antoninus of Florence
Blessed Bernard of Baden	1428		1458		Margrave of Baden-Baden
Blessed Christina Visconti	1435		1458		
Blessed Elena Valentinis	1396	Udine, Venice	1458	Udine, Venice	
Antoninus of Florence	1389		1459		
Blessed Anthony della Chiesa	1395		1459		
Blessed Anthony Neyrot	1425		1460		
Blessed Anthony of Stroncone	1381		1461		
Blessed Andrew Oexner of Riun			1462		
Catherine of Bologna	1413		1463		
Diego of Alcala	1400		1463		
Blessed Margaret of Savoy	June 21, 1390	Fossano	November 23, 1464	Casale Monferrato	
Blessed Magdalene Albrici			1465		
Blessed Bartholomew of Cervere	1420		1466		Inquisitor of Savigliano, murdered by Waldenses
Blessed Elizabeth Picenardi	1428		1468		
Blessed Eustochium of Messina	1432		1468		
Blessed Julian Mayali			1470		
Blessed Matthew of Mantua			1470		
Blessed Isaiah of Cracow			1471		
Blessed Thomas a Kempis	1380		1471		
Blessed Amadeus IX, Duke of Savoy	1435		1472		
Blessed Antonia of Florence	1401		1472		
John of Kanty	1390		1474		
Simon of Trent			1475		
James of the March	1394		1476		
Blessed Catherine of Pallanza	1437		1478		
John of Sahagun	1430		1479		
Blessed Mark Fantucci	1405		1479		
Martyrs of Otranto			1480	Otranto	800 men martyred after the Ottoman invasion of Otranto
Blessed Constantius of Fabriano			1481		
Amadeus of Portugal	1420		1482		
Blessed Anthony Bonfadini	1400		1482		
Blessed Pacificus of Ceredano	1424		1482		
Blessed Simon of Lipnicza			1482		
Blessed James Bertoni	1444		1483		
Casimir of Poland	1458	Kraków	1484	Grodno	Son of the King Casimir IV of Poland
Blessed Christopher of Milan			1484		
Blessed Damian of Finario (Damian dei Fulcheri)		Finale Ligure	1484		
Blessed Helie de Bourdeille	1413		1484		
John of Dukla	1414	Dukla	29 September 1484	Lwów	
Peter Arbues	1441	Epila, Aragon	1485	Zaragoza	Inquisitor of Zaragoza, murdered by judeoconversos
Blessed Andrew Gregho of Peschiera	1400		1485		
Blessed Frances of Amboise	1427		1485		
Blessed Louis Morbioli	1433		1485		
Blessed Michael Giedroyc			1485		
Nicholas von Flue	1417		March 21, 1487		
Blessed Bartholomew of Foresto			1489		
Beatriz da Silva	1424	Campo Maior, Portugal	1490	Toledo, Spain	
Blessed Aloysius Rabata			1490		
Blessed James of Bitetto			1490		
Blessed Joanna of Portugal	1452		1490		
Blessed Peter of Mongliano	1442		1490		
Blessed Giovanna	1428		1491		
Blessed James of Ulm (Jakob Griesinger)	1407		1491		
Blessed Balthasar of Chiavari	1420		1492		
Blessed Prudenza			1492		
Blessed Augustine of Biella	1430		1493		
Blessed Archangela Girlani	1460		1494		
Blessed Bernardine of Feltre	1439		1494		
Blessed Aimo Taparelli (Haymo)	1398	Savigliano	1495	Savigliano	Inquisitor of Savigliano and confessor of Amadeus IX, Duke of Savoy
Blessed Angelo of Chivasso	1411		1495		
Blessed Bartholomew Fanti	1443		1495		
Blessed Sebastian Maggi	1414		1496		
Blessed Thaddeus MacCarthy	1455		1497		Bishop of Cork
Blessed Veronica of Binasco	1445		1497		
Blessed Mark of Modena			1498		

== See also ==
- Christianity in the 15th century
