= Stephana de Quinzanis =

Italian mystic (1457–1530)

Blessed Stephana de Quinzanis TOSD
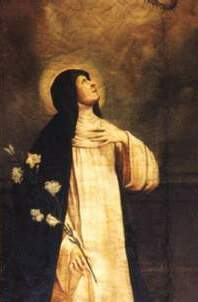

Virgin
- Born: 1457; Brescia, Italy
- Died: 2 January 1530; Soncino, Cremona, Italy
- Venerated in: Roman Catholic Church
- Beatified: 14 December 1740 by Pope Benedict XIV
- Major shrine: Convent of the Dominican Tertiary Sisters; Soncino, Cremona, Italy
- Feast: 2 January

Stephana de Quinzanis, TOSD (variant spellings include Stephanie, Stefana; also, Quinzani) (1457 – 2 January 1530) was an Italian sister of the Third Order of St. Dominic, stigmatic and mystic. She was beatified by Pope Benedict XIV in 1740.

== Life ==
She was born in 1457 in Brescia, Italy, to Lorenzo de Quinzanis and his wife, who were a poor and pious couple. Her father became a member of the Third Order of St. Dominic while Stephana was very young. While accompanying him on visits to the Dominican monastery in nearby Soncino, she met the stigmatic friar, Matthew Carrieri, OP, who instructed her in the catechism. Carrieri told her that she would be his spiritual heiress, a statement she did not understand for many years. She began receiving visions of Dominican saints from age seven, at which point she made vows of poverty, chastity and obedience. In a subsequent miraculous experience in 1464, Christ appeared to her, accompanied by Mary and Dominican saints Dominic, Thomas Aquinas, and Catherine of Siena, presenting her with a wedding ring, signifying her mystical marriage. Carrieri died when Stephana was 14 years old; soon after he appeared to her in a vision, and she herself received the stigmata.

De Quinzanis started to work as a servant for her living, but she continued in her formation in the Third Order, and at age 15 made her profession at the Dominican priory in Soncino. Her devotion to the poor and sick led her to found a community of Third Order Sisters there. She served as its first prioress.

Her counsel was sought by many, including Angela Merici, foundress of the Ursulines, also Augustine Fangi, as well as her fellow Dominican tertiary and mystic, Osanna of Mantua. She participated in various stages of the passion of Jesus Christ, which was attested to by 21 witnesses in 1497 in a still extant account, written in the vernacular, and entitled Relazione dell'Estasi della Passione. Sources state that although Stephana was "ugly", she had magnificent hair. Grudging herself this one beauty, she pulled it out by the roots.

Blessed Stephana depicted on a holy card

De Quinzanis had a particularly intense devotion to Saint Thomas Aquinas. In fact, to overcome the temptation of thoughts against purity, she once threw herself upon a cartload of thorns in imitation of the Doctor Angelicus. Exhausted from this penance, she prayed to Saint Thomas, and, according to legend, was girded by angels with a cord, which they tied so tightly around her waist that she cried out in pain.

Though she had no formal theological training, she could discuss mystical theology at the most profound level. She is therefore considered a patron saint for theologians. It is said that she could read the hearts and minds of the people around her, and had the gift of prophesy and healing. She lived in a nearly continuous fasting. She accurately predicted the date of her own death, which occurred from natural causes on 2 January 1530.

== Veneration ==
De Quinzanis' tomb became a pilgrimage site almost immediately. Her intercession was often felt in the convent that she had founded, where the sisters obtained both material and spiritual help through her intercession.

Her cult was popularized by the Dominicans Bartholomeo of Mantua and Battista of Salò, but their Latin vitae have been lost, and only a later Italian version which combined the two texts has survived. Her cultus was confirmed by Pope Benedict XIV on 14 December 1740.
