= Christianity in the 15th century =

The 15th century marked the transition from the Late Middle Ages to the Early Modern Period in Western Christendom. It was dominated by the spread of the Italian Renaissance and its philosophy of Renaissance Humanism (gradually replacing medieval scholasticism) from its heartland in Northern and Central Italy across the whole of Western Europe.

== Eastern Orthodoxy ==
=== Reunion attempts ===
The eastern Emperor John VIII Palaeologus, pressed hard by the Ottoman Turks, was keen to ally himself with the West, and to do so he arranged with Pope Eugene IV for discussions about reunion to be held again, this time at the Council of Ferrara-Florence. After several long discussions, the emperor managed to convince the Eastern representatives to accept the Western doctrines of Filioque, Purgatory and the supremacy of the Papacy. On 6 June 1439, an agreement was signed by all the Eastern bishops present but one, Mark of Ephesus, who held that Rome continued in both heresy and schism. It seemed that the Great Schism had been ended. However, upon their return, the Eastern bishops found their agreement with the West broadly rejected by the populace and by civil authorities (with the notable exception of the emperors of the East who remained committed to union until the Fall of Constantinople two decades later). The union signed at Florence has never been accepted by the Eastern churches.

=== Fall of Constantinople ===
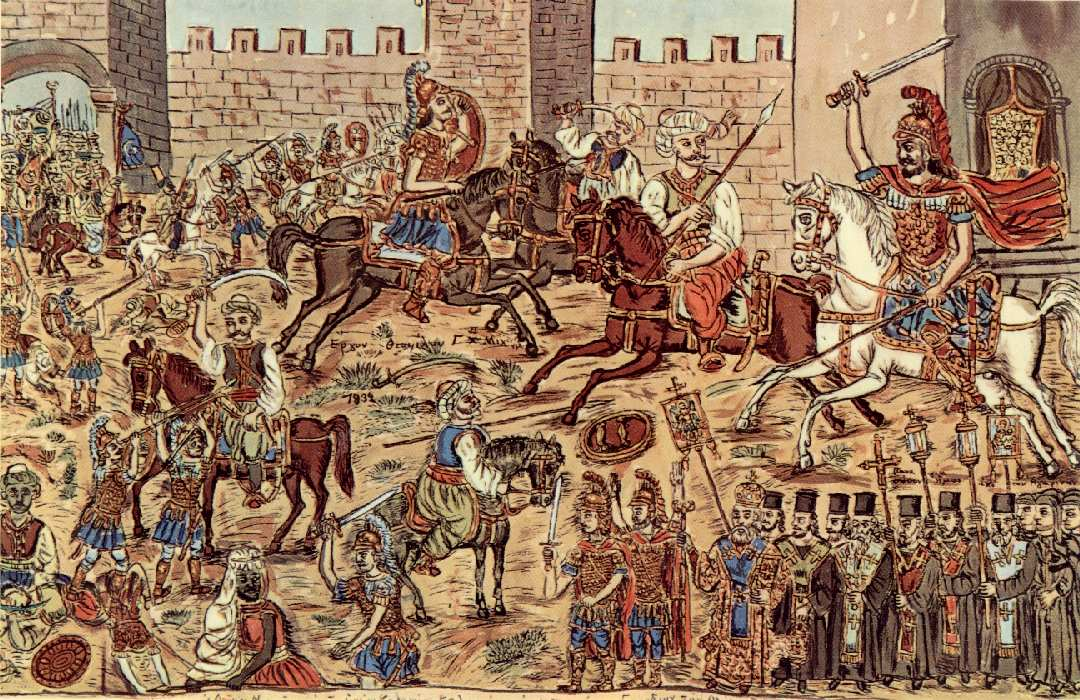
Painting by the Greek folk painter Theophilos Hatzimihail showing the battle inside the city, Constantine is visible on a white horse

In 1453, the Eastern Roman Empire fell to the Ottoman Empire. But Orthodoxy was still very strong in Russia which became autocephalous (since 1448, although this was not officially accepted by Constantinople until 1589); and thus Moscow called itself the Third Rome, as the cultural heir of Constantinople.

Eastern Christians expressed a belief that the fall of Constantinople was God's punishment for the emperor and clergy accepting the West's doctrines of filioque, purgatory and the supremacy of the papacy. The West did not fulfill its promise to the Eastern emperor of troops and support if he agreed to the reconciliation. The Sack of Constantinople is still considered proof by the East that the West ultimately succeeded in its endeavor to destroy the East.

Under Ottoman rule, the Orthodox Church acquired power as an autonomous millet. The ecumenical patriarch was the religious and administrative ruler of the entire Rum Millet (Ottoman administrative unit), which encompassed all the Eastern Orthodox subjects of the empire. Those appointed to the role were chosen by the Muslims rulers not the Church.

As a result of the Ottoman conquest, the entire Orthodox communion of the Balkans and the Near East became suddenly isolated from the West. For the next four hundred years, it was confined within the Islamic world, with which it had little in common religiously or culturally. The Orthodox Churches from East Slavic states, Wallachia and Moldavia were the only part of the Orthodox communion that remained outside the control of the Ottoman Empire.

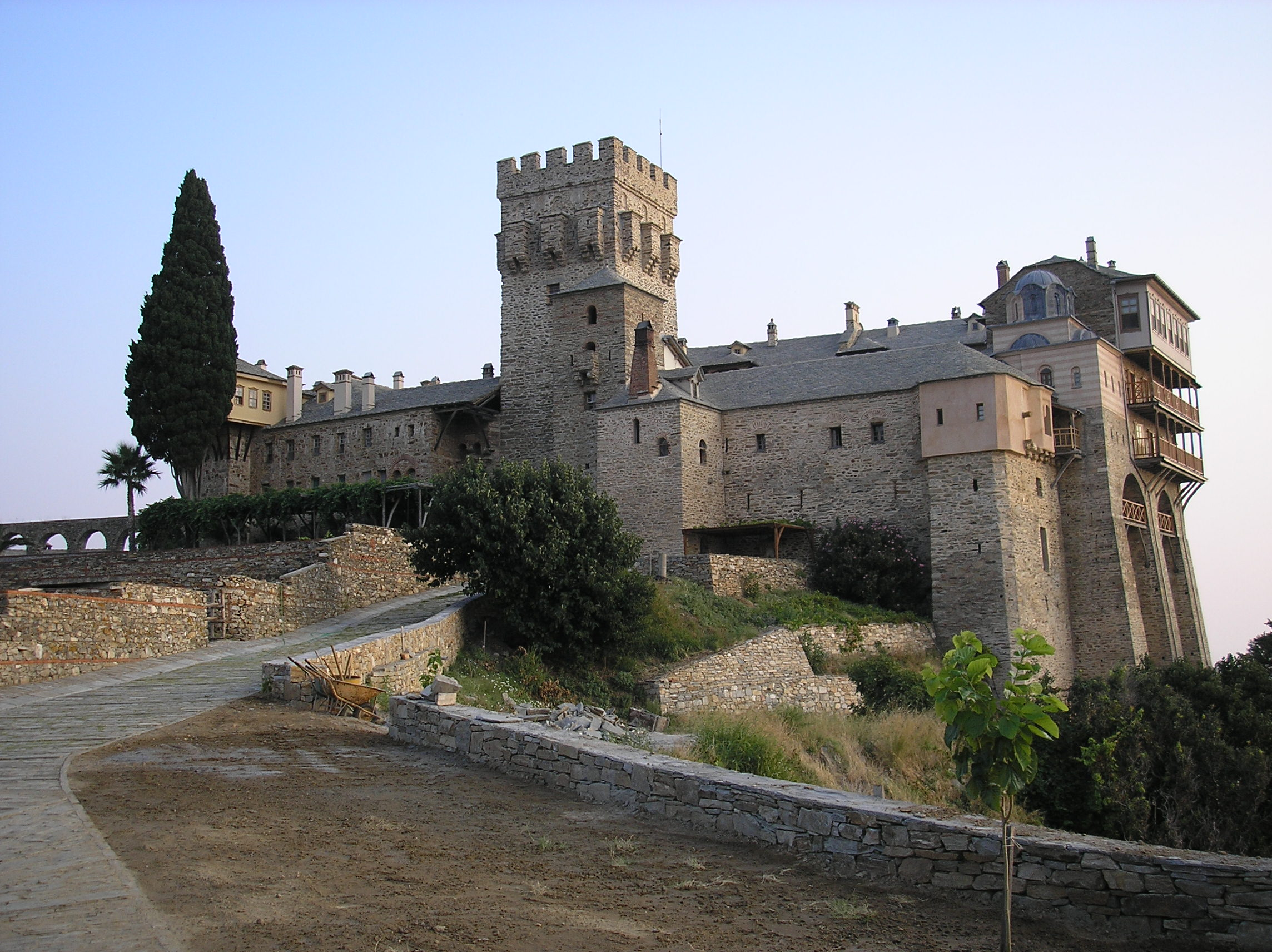
Stavronikita monastery, South-East view

=== Isolation from the West ===
As a result of the Ottoman conquest of the Byzantine Empire in 1453, and the Fall of Constantinople, the entire Orthodox communion of the Balkans and the Near East became suddenly isolated from the West. For the next four hundred years, it was confined within a hostile Islamic world, with which it had little in common religiously or culturally. The Russian Orthodox Church was the only part of the Orthodox communion which remained outside the control of the Ottoman Empire. It is, in part, due to this geographical and intellectual confinement that the voice of Eastern Orthodoxy was not heard during the Reformation in 16th-century Europe. As a result, this important theological debate often seems strange and distorted to the Orthodox. They never took part in it and thus neither Reformation nor Counter-Reformation is part of their theological framework.

=== Religious rights under the Ottoman Empire ===
Islam recognized Jesus as a great prophet and considered Christians as another People of the Book. But it imposed severe penalties including frequent deaths for non Muslims. As such, the Church was not extinguished nor was its canonical and hierarchical organization completely destroyed. Its administration continued to function though in lesser degree, no longer being the state religion. One of the first things that Mehmet the Conqueror did was to allow the Church to elect a new patriarch, Gennadius Scholarius. The Hagia Sophia and the Parthenon, which had been Christian churches for nearly a millennium, were converted into mosques, yet most other churches, both in Constantinople and elsewhere, remained in Christian hands. Because Islamic law makes no distinction between nationality and religion, all Christians, regardless of their language or nationality, were considered a single millet, or nation. The patriarch, as the highest ranking hierarch, was thus invested with civil and religious authority and made ethnarch, head of the entire Christian Orthodox population. Practically, this meant that all Orthodox Churches within Ottoman territory were under the control of Constantinople. Thus, the authority and jurisdictional frontiers of the patriarch were enormously enlarged.

However, these rights and privileges, including freedom of worship and religious organisation, were often established in principle but seldom corresponded to reality. The legal privileges of the patriarch and the Church depended, in fact, on the whim and mercy of the Sultan and the Sublime Porte, while all Christians were viewed as second-class citizens. Moreover, Turkish corruption and brutality were not a myth. That it was the "infidel" Christian who experienced this more than anyone else is not in doubt. Nor were pogroms of Christians in these centuries unknown (see Greco-Turkish relations). Devastating, too, for the Church was that it could not bear witness to Christ. Missionary work among Muslims was dangerous and indeed impossible, whereas conversion to Islam was entirely legal and permissible. Converts to Islam who returned to Orthodoxy were put to death as apostates. No new churches could be built, and even the ringing of church bells was prohibited. Education of the clergy and the Christian population either ceased altogether or was reduced to the most rudimentary elements.

=== Corruption ===
The Orthodox Church found itself subject to the Turkish system of corruption. The patriarchal throne was frequently sold to the highest bidder, while new patriarchal investiture was accompanied by heavy payment to the government. In order to recoup their losses, patriarchs and bishops taxed the local parishes and their clergy. The patriarchal throne was never secure. Few patriarchs between the 15th and the 19th centuries died a natural death while in office. The forced abdications, exiles, hangings, drownings, and poisonings of patriarchs are well documented. But if the patriarch's position was precarious so was the hierarchy's.

=== Devshirmeh ===
Devshirmeh was the system of the collection of young boys from conquered Christian lands by the Ottoman sultans as a form of regular taxation in order to build a loyal army (formerly largely composed of war captives) and the class of (military) administrators called the "Janissaries", or other servants such as tellak in hamams. The word devşirme means "collecting, gathering" in Ottoman Turkish. Boys delivered to the Ottomans in this way were called ghilmán or acemi oglanlar ("novice boys").

=== Antioch ===
The Church of Antioch was moved to Damascus in response to the Ottoman invasion of Antioch. Its traditional territory includes Syria, Lebanon, Iran, Iraq, Kuwait and parts of Turkey. The remainder of the Church of Antioch, primarily local Greeks or Hellenized sections of the indigenous population, remained in communion with Rome, Constantinople, Alexandria, and Jerusalem.

=== Serbia ===
In the second half of the 15th century, the Ottoman Empire gradually conquered all Serbian lands. Finally, the Serbian capital of Smederevo fell and Serbia was officially conquered by Sultan Mehmed II on June 20, 1459. All eparchies of the Serbian Patriarchate were devastated during Turkish raids, and many monasteries and churches were plundered and destroyed. Because of that, the period was remembered as "The Great Desolation" (ser. великое запустение). After the death of Patriarch Arsenije II in 1463, the question of succession was opened. Since sources are silent, historians concluded that the period of vacancy was prolonged, resulting in de facto abolition of the Patriarchal office.

== Western Christianity ==
=== Western Schism ===
In 1409, a council was convened at Pisa to resolve the issue. The council declared both existing popes to be schismatic (Gregory XII from Rome; Benedict XIII from Avignon) and appointed a new one, Alexander V. But the existing popes refused to resign, and thus there were three papal claimants. Another council was convened in 1414, the Council of Constance. In March 1415 the Pisan pope, John XXIII, fled from Constance in disguise; he was brought back a prisoner and deposed in May. The Roman pope, Gregory XII, resigned voluntarily in July. The Avignon pope, Benedict XIII, refused to come to Constance; nor would he consider resignation. The council finally deposed him in July 1417. The council in Constance, having finally cleared the field of popes and antipopes, elected Pope Martin V as pope in November.

=== Italian Renaissance (1399–1599) ===
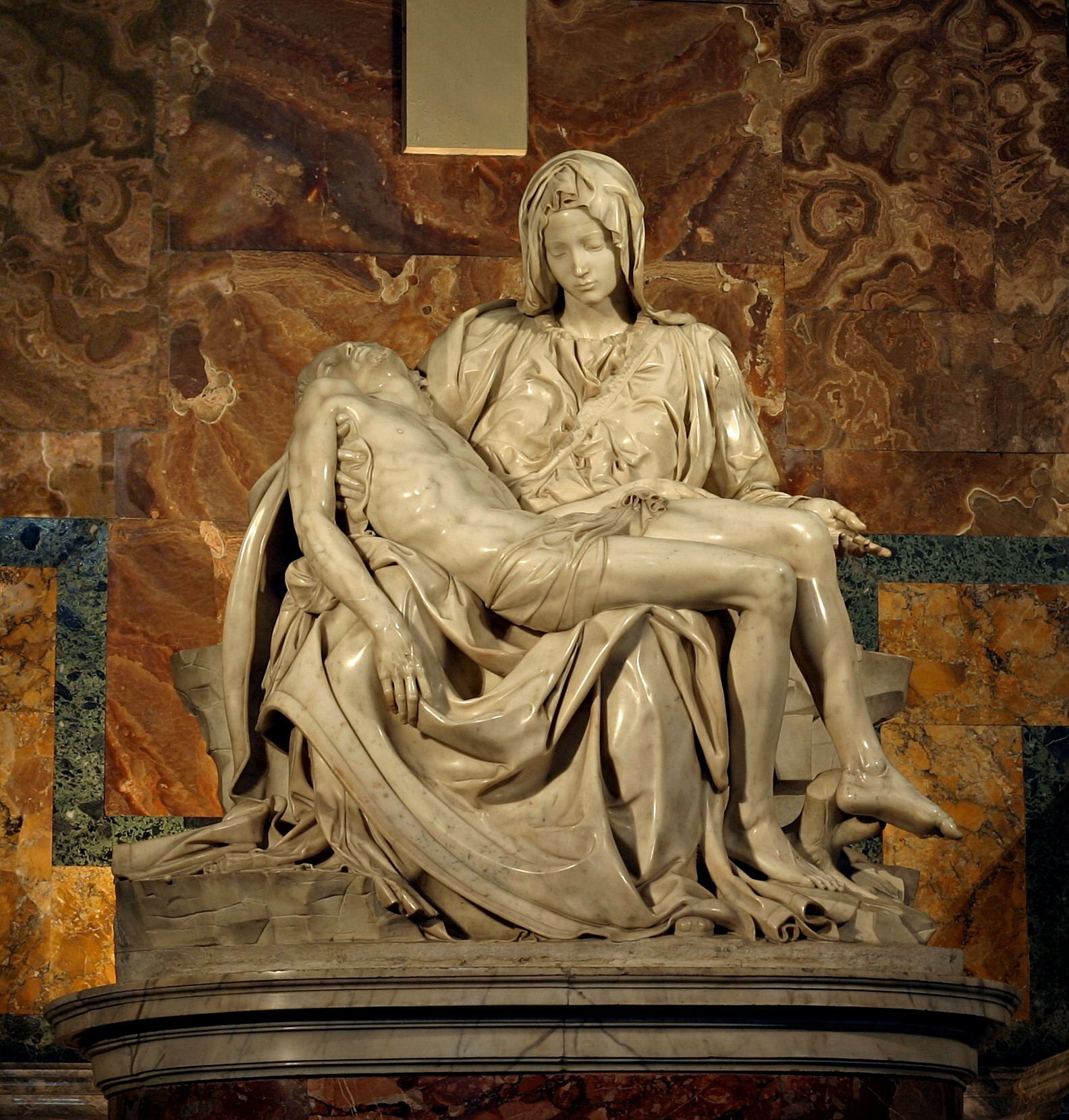
Michelangelo's Pietà in St. Peter's Basilica, Vatican City

The Italian Renaissance was a period of great cultural change and achievement, marked in Italy by a classical orientation and an increase of wealth through mercantile trade. The city of Rome, the Papacy, and the Papal States were all affected by the Renaissance. On the one hand, it was a time of great artistic patronage and architectural magnificence, where the Church supported such artists as Michelangelo, Brunelleschi, Bramante, Raphael, Fra Angelico, Donatello, and Leonardo da Vinci. On the other hand, wealthy Italian families often secured episcopal offices, including the papacy, for their own members, some of whom were known for immorality, such as Alexander VI and Sixtus IV.

=== Scholasticism and Movements ===
Scholastic theology continued to develop as the 13th century gave way to the fourteenth, becoming ever more complex and subtle in its distinctions and arguments. The 14th century saw in particular the rise to dominance of the nominalist or voluntarist theologies of men like William of Ockham. The 14th century was also a time in which movements of widely varying character worked for the reform of the institutional church, such as conciliarism, Lollardy and the Hussites. Spiritual movements such as the Devotio Moderna also flourished.

Notable authors

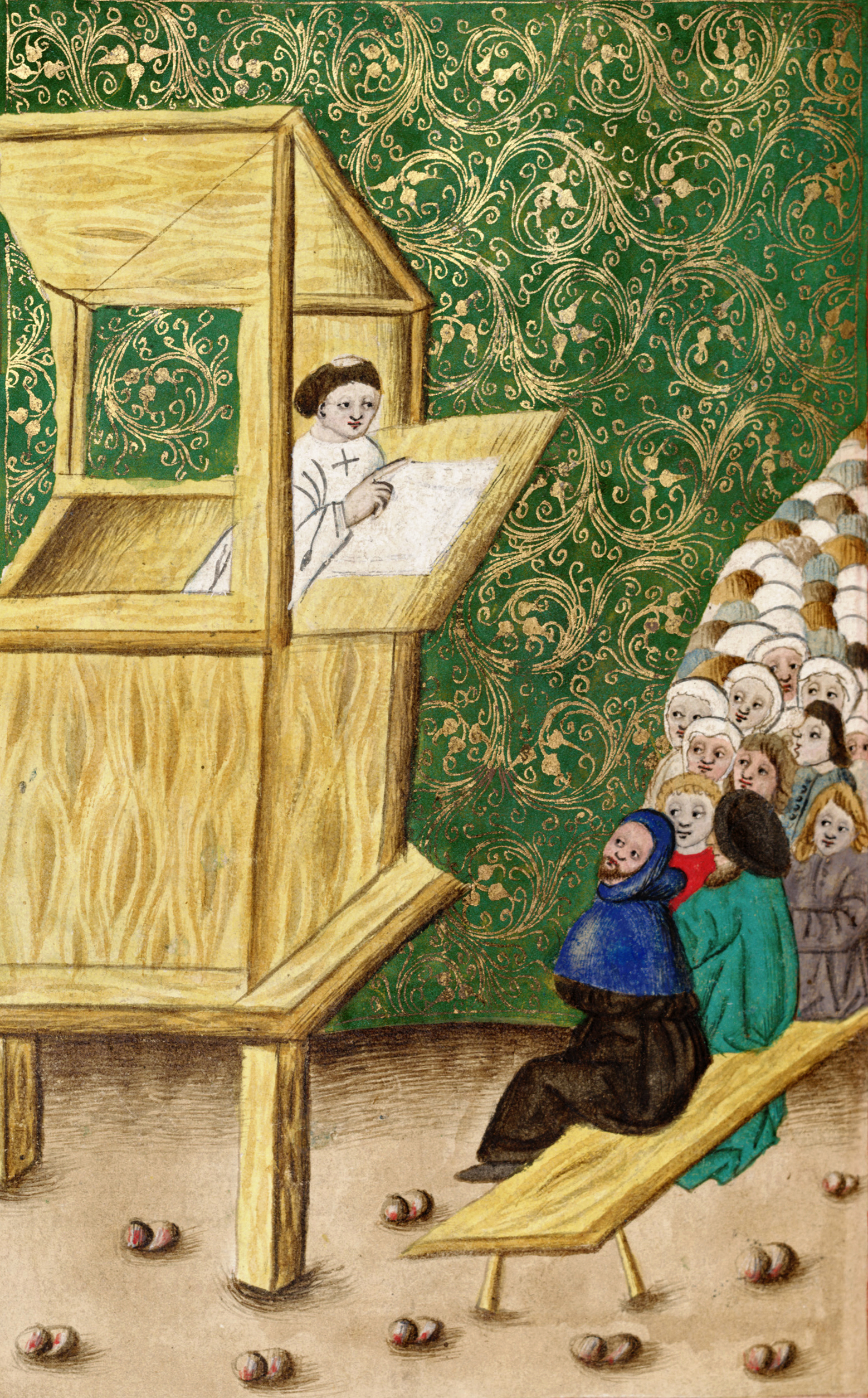
Jan Hus preaching, illumination from a Czech manuscript, 1490s

- Jan Hus (c.1369–1415)
- Pierre d'Ailly (1351–1420)
- Jean Gerson (1363–1429)
- Nicholas of Clemanges (1360–1440)
- Nicholas of Cusa (1401–1464)
- Thomas a Kempis (1380–1471)
- Denis the Carthusian (1402–1471)
- Rudolf Agricola (1444–1485)
- Wessel Gansfort (1419–1489)
- Gabriel Biel (1425–1495)
- Johann Heynlin (1425–1496)
- Girolamo Savonarola (1452–1498)
- Jan Standonck (1454–1504)
- Conrad Celtis (1459–1508)
- Johann Geiler (1445–1510)
- Johann Reuchlin (1455–1522)
- Johann von Staupitz (1460–1524)
- Jacob Wimpfeling (1450–1528)
- Jacques Lefevre d'Etaples (1455–1536)

=== Protestant Reformation roots and precursors ===
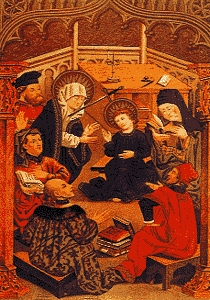
Hussite theologians dispute in the presence of King Władysław II Jagiełło of Poland

The Council of Constance confirmed strengthened the traditional medieval conception of Churches and Empires. It did not address the national tensions or the theological tensions which had been stirred up during the previous century. The council could not prevent schisms and the Hussite Wars in Bohemia.

Historical upheaval usually yields much new thinking as to how society should be organized. This was the case leading up to the Protestant Reformation. Following the breakdown of monastic institutions and scholasticism in late medieval Europe, accentuated by the "Babylonian Captivity" of the Avignon Papacy, the Great Schism, and the failure of the Conciliar movement, the 16th century saw the fomenting of a great cultural debate about religious reforms and later fundamental religious values. Historians would generally assume that the failure to reform (too many vested interests, lack of coordination in the reforming coalition) would eventually lead to a greater upheaval or even revolution since the system must eventually be adjusted or disintegrate, and the failure of the Conciliar movement helped lead to the Protestant Reformation in Europe. These frustrated reformist movements ranged from nominalism, devotio moderna (modern devotion), to humanism occurring in conjunction with economic, political and demographic forces that contributed to a growing disaffection with the wealth and power of the elite clergy, sensitizing the population to the financial and moral corruption of the secular Renaissance church.

The outcome of the Black Death encouraged a radical reorganization of the economy and eventually of European society. In the emerging urban centers, however, the calamities of the 14th and early 15th century, and the resultant labor shortages, provided a strong impetus for economic diversification and technological innovations. Following the Black Death, the initial loss of life from famine, plague, and pestilence contributed to an intensification of capital accumulation in the urban areas and thus a stimulus to trade, industry, and burgeoning urban growth in fields as diverse as banking (the Fugger banking family in Augsburg and the Medici family of Florence being the most prominent); textiles, armaments, especially stimulated by the Hundred Years' War, and mining of iron ore with the booming armaments industry. Accumulation of surplus, competitive overproduction, and heightened competition to maximize economic advantage contributed to civil war, aggressive militarism, and thus to centralization. As a direct result of the move toward centralization, leaders like Louis XI of France sought to remove all constitutional restrictions on the exercise of their authority. In England, France, and Spain the move toward centralization begun in the 13th century was carried to a successful conclusion.

But as recovery and prosperity progressed, enabling the population to reach its former levels in the late 15th and 16th centuries, the combination of both a newly abundant labor supply as well as improved productivity, were 'mixed blessings' for many segments of Western European society. Despite tradition, landlords started the move to exclude peasants from "common lands". With trade stimulated, landowners increasingly moved away from the manorial economy. Woolen manufacturing greatly expanded in France, Germany, and the Netherlands and new textile industries began to develop.

The invention of movable type leads to the Protestant zeal for translating the Bible and getting it into the hands of the laity. This would advance the culture of Biblical literacy.

The "humanism" of the Renaissance period stimulated unprecedented academic ferment, and a concern for academic freedom. Ongoing, earnest theoretical debates occurred in the universities about the nature of the church, and the source and extent of the authority of the papacy, of councils, and of princes.

== Spread of Christianity ==
Through the late 15th and early 16th centuries, European missionaries and explorers spread Catholicism to the Americas, Asia, Africa and Oceania. Pope Alexander VI, in the papal bull Inter caetera, awarded colonial rights over most of the newly discovered lands to Spain and Portugal. Under the patronato system, state authorities controlled clerical appointments, and no direct contact was allowed with the Vatican.

On December 1511, the Dominican friar Antonio de Montesinos openly rebuked the Spanish authorities governing Hispaniola for their mistreatment of the American natives, telling them "... you are in mortal sin ... for the cruelty and tyranny you use in dealing with these innocent people". King Ferdinand enacted the Laws of Burgos and Valladolid in response. Enforcement was lax, and while some blame the Church for not doing enough to liberate the Indians, others point to the Church as the only voice raised on behalf of indigenous peoples.

== Timeline ==
15th century Timeline
- 1408 Council of Oxford forbids translations of the Scriptures into the vernacular unless and until they were fully approved by Church authority
- 1408 - Spanish Dominican Vincent Ferrer begins a ministry in Italy in which it is said that thousands of Jews and Muslims were won to faith in Christ
- 1409 Council of Pisa, declared Roman Pope Gregory XII and Avignon Pope Benedict XIII deposed, elected Pope Alexander V (called the Pisan Pope)
- 1410 - Bible is translated into Hungarian
- 1414–1418 Catholic Council of Constance, asked Gregory XII, Benedict XIII, Pisan Pope John XXIII to resign their papal claims, then elected Pope Martin V; condemned John Wycliffe and Jan Hus who was burned at the stake
- 1420 - Franciscan missionaries accompany Portuguese expedition to Madeira
- 1423–1424 Council of Siena
- 1425 Catholic University of Leuven
- 1430? Andrei Rublev, the greatest of medieval icon-painters
- 1431 - Franciscan missionaries accompany Portuguese expedition to the Azores
- 1431 St. Joan of Arc, French national heroine, burned at the stake
- 1431–1445 Catholic Council of Basel-Ferrara-Florence
- 1435 - Forced conversion of Jews in Palma de Mallorca, Spain
- 1439 Notre-Dame de Strasbourg, highest building in the world until 1874
- 1445 - First Christians reported in Guinea Bissau
- 1448 - First Christians reported in Mauritania
- 1450 - Franscian missionaries accompany Portuguese expedition to the Cape Verde Islands
- 1453 - Constantinople falls to the Muslim Ottoman Turks who make it their capital. An Islamic service of thanksgiving is held in the church of Saint Sophia
- 1453 Fall of Constantinople, overrun by Ottoman Empire
- 1455 - With the bull Romanus Pontifex the patronage of missions in new countries behind Cape Bojador is given to the Portuguese.
- 1455 Gutenberg Bible, first printed Bible, by Johann Gutenberg
- 1462 - Johannes Gutenberg begins printing the Bible with his movable-type printing process; Pope Pius II assigns the evangelization of the Portuguese Guinea Coast of Africa to the Franciscans led by Alfonso de Bolano
- 1473–1481 Sistine Chapel built
- 1478 Spanish Inquisition established by Pope Sixtus IV
- 1484 December 5, Summis desiderantes against Witchcraft issued by Pope Innocent VIII
- 1485 - After having come into contact with the Portuguese, the King of Benin requests that a church be planted in his kingdom
- 1486 - Dominicans become active in West Africa, notably among the Wolof people in Senegambia.
- 1489 - Baptism of Wolof king Behemoi in Senegal
- 1491 - The Congo sees its first group of missionaries arrive. Under the ministry of these Franciscan and Dominican priests, the king would soon be baptized and a church built at the royal capital.
- 1492 - Birth of the church in Angola
- 1493 - Pope Alexander VI commands Spain to colonize the New World with Catholic missions; Christopher Columbus takes Christian priests with him on his second journey to the New World
- 1494 - First missionaries arrive in Dominican Republic
- 1495 - The head of a convent in Seville, Spain, Mercedarian Jorge, makes a trip to the West Indies.
- 1496 - First Christian baptisms in the New World take place when Guaticaba along with other members of his household are baptized on the island of Hispaniola
- 1497 - Forced conversion of Jews in Portugal
- 1498 - First Christians are reported in Kenya
- 1498 Girolamo Savonarola, Dominican priest, Bonfire of the Vanities
- 1499 - Portuguese Augustinian missionaries arrive at Zanzibar. Their mission will end in 1698 due to the Oman-Arab conquest.
- 1500 - Franciscans enter Brazil with Cabral

== See also ==
- History of Christianity
- History of the Roman Catholic Church
- History of the Eastern Orthodox Church
- History of Christian theology#Late Scholasticism and its contemporaries
- History of Oriental Orthodoxy
- Timeline of Christianity#Middle Ages
- Timeline of Christian missions#Middle Ages
- Timeline of the Roman Catholic Church#800–1453
- Chronological list of saints and blesseds in the 15th century

History of Christianity: The Middle Ages
Preceded by: Christianity in the 14th century / 15th century / Followed by: Christianity in the 16th century
| BC | C1 | C2 | C3 | C4 | C5 | C6 | C7 | C8 | C9 | C10 |
| C11 | C12 | C13 | C14 | C15 | C16 | C17 | C18 | C19 | C20 | C21 |
