= Lorenzo da Ripafratta =

Italian religious

Blessed Lorenzo da Ripafratta O.P.
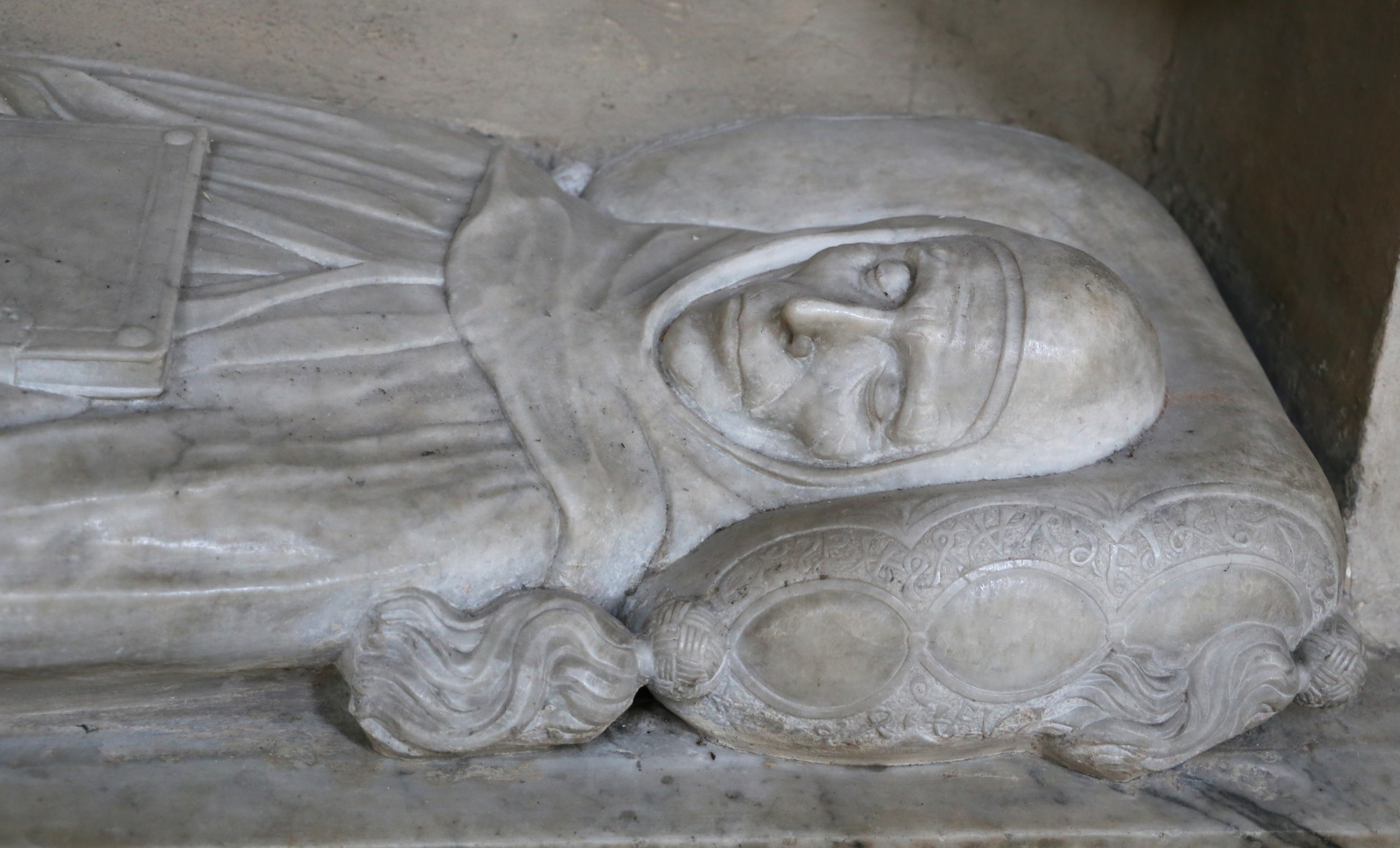

Religious
- Born: 1373; Ripafratta, Pisa, Republic of Florence
- Died: 27 September 1456 (aged 83); Pistoia, Republic of Florence
- Venerated in: Roman Catholic Church
- Beatified: 4 April 1851, Saint Peter's Basilica, Papal States by Pope Pius IX
- Feast: 27 September
- Attributes: Dominican habit

Lorenzo da Ripafratta (1373 – 27 September 1456) was an Italian Roman Catholic professed religious from the Order of Preachers. He was born to nobles in Pisa and served as a novice master in Cortona in the latter half of his career while distinguishing himself in aiding the ill during times of the plague in both Pistoia and Fabriano.

He was beatified on 4 April 1851 when Pope Pius IX approved that there existed an enduring and local 'cultus'—or popular devotion—to the late friar.

== Life ==
Lorenzo da Ripafratta was born in 1373 in Ripafratta, Pisa, to nobles tasked with guarding the town's outer defenses.

He assumed residence at the Santa Caterina convent in Pisa in 1396 after joining the Order of Preachers and receiving their habit. He served as the novice master in Cortona from 1402 (until relocation to Pistoia later) and would there oversee the spiritual formation of the likes of Guido di Pietro and Antoninus of Florence. He distinguished himself in aiding the victims of the plague in both Pistoia and Fabriano. Lorenzo became known for his harsh methods of personal penance and underwent long fasts and vigils. Lorenzo was also called to help in the reform movement of the order that Giovanni Dominici began and led. He moved to the convent of San Domenico in Pistoia after being made its vicar-general. He continued to maintain correspondence with Antoninus as he felt that being the Archbishop of Florence was a difficult task and that Antoninus would need to hear from friends.

In the later decades of his life he suffered pain in one of his legs and endured it with remarkable resilience as a penitential sign. He died on 27 September 1456.

== Beatification ==
The late friar was beatified on 4 April 1851 after Pope Pius IX confirmed that the late religious had a spontaneous and enduring local 'cultus' - otherwise noted as longstanding veneration - that still existed as a testament to the late friar's reputation for holiness.
