= Herculanus of Piegaro =

Italian Roman Catholic saint

Herculanus of Piegaro (died 1451) was an Italian Franciscan, beatified in 1860. He is commemorated on 2 June.

Born at Piegaro, he entered the Franciscan Convent of the Strict Observance at Sarteano, where he studied under Albert Berdini of Sarteano. He later accompanied Berdini on his travels to Jerusalem and Cairo as a diplomatic envoy of Pope Eugene IV.

After his ordination as a priest Herculanus lived for a time in seclusion and in prayer before he was sent out to preach, and he became one of the order's best preachers in the 15th century.

He was said to have emboldened the citizens of Lucca to resist an attack by the Florentines in 1430. After a pilgrimage to the Holy Land, he returned to Tuscany. He spent his last years in a monastery he had founded in Castelnuovo in Tuscany, where he died on 28 May 1451. His body is said to have remained incorrupt after his death when 5 years after he died it was moved to a shrine in the local Franciscan church.

He was beatified on 29 March 1860 when his cult was confirmed by Pope Pius IX.
