= Giovanni Liccio =

Religious figure (c. 1430-1511)

Blessed Giovanni Liccio O.P.
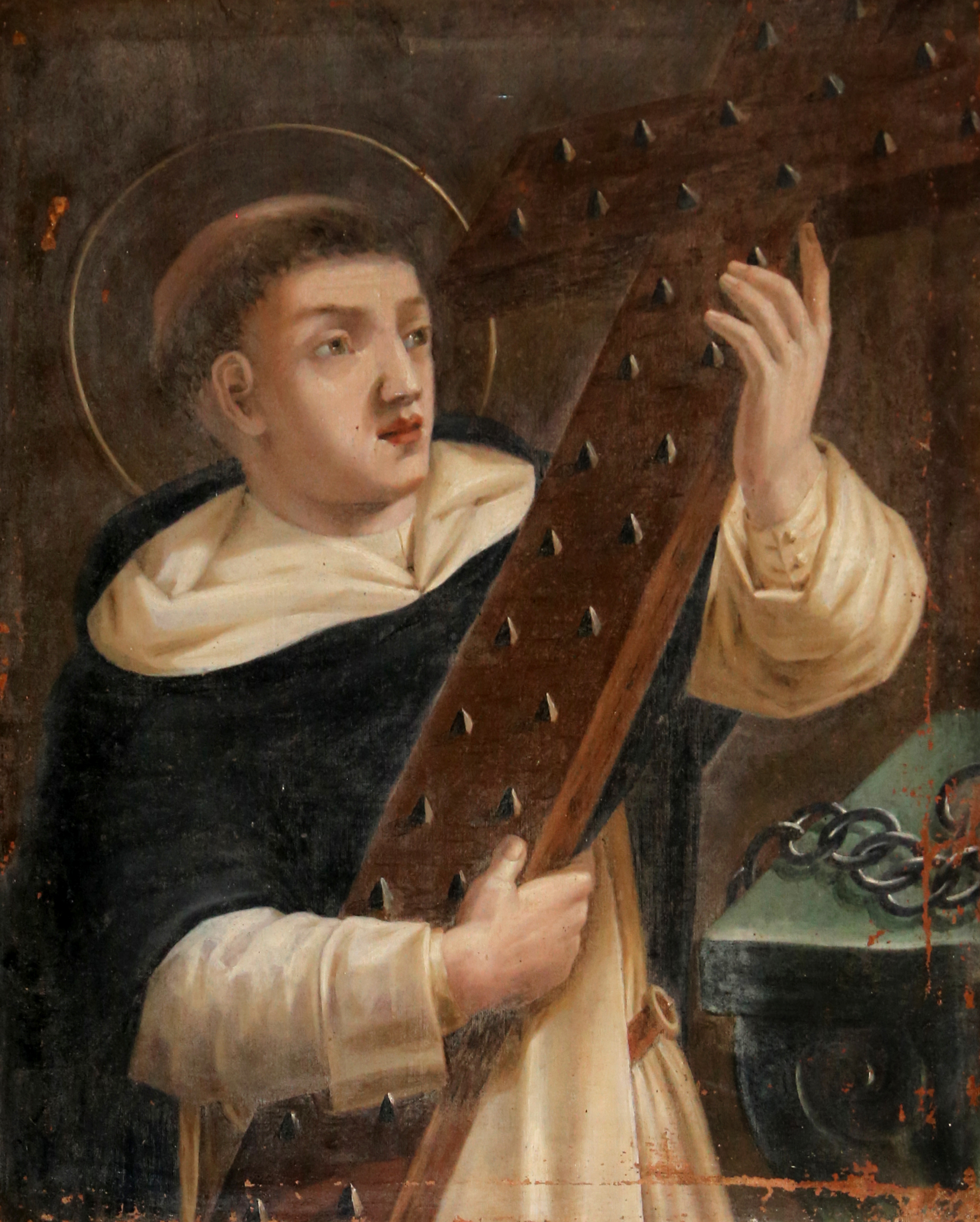

Priest
- Born: c.1430 Caccamo, Palermo, Kingdom of Naples
- Died: 14 November 1511; Caccamo, Palermo, Kingdom of Naples
- Venerated in: Roman Catholic Church
- Beatified: 25 April 1753, Saint Peter's Basilica, Papal States by Pope Benedict XIV
- Feast: 14 November
- Attributes: Dominican habit; Crucifix
- Patronage: Caccamo; Against head injuries

Blessed Giovanni Liccio (c.1430 - 14 November 1511) was an Italian Roman Catholic priest and a professed member of the Order of Preachers. Liccio was a noted miracle worker and a pious preacher who was also known for his simple and ascetic manner of living. Liccio's miracles earned him the reputation of being a saint and devotion to him throughout the Sicilian cities spread.

On 25 April 1753 he was beatified after his cultus was approved.

== Life ==
Giovanni Liccio was born around 1430 in Caccamo to a poor farmer. His mother died during childbirth. His father neglected the child; he fed him crushed pomegranates, all he could afford. Liccio's cries led to a female neighbor taking him to her home to feed him and left him next to the bedside of her husband who was paralyzed. As soon as Liccio was placed near him, the husband found that he could move. The neighbor told Liccio's father but the latter was dismissive and more concerned with the fact that she had taken his son without his permission. As soon as the child was taken the husband could no longer move. Liccio's father took this as a sign of the divine and allowed the neighbours to care for his son while he worked. After a short time, the man was once again able to walk.

As the child grew older, he was cared for by an aunt. Before he turned ten he was able to recite the canonical hours. On a trip to Palermo he went to have his confession heard in the church of Saint Zita of Lucca; the Blessed Pietro Geremia heard his confession and suggested that Liccio take Holy Orders. Despite his initial feelings of doubt he joined the Order of Preachers in 1445 and was later ordained to the priesthood.

Once he was ordained he was sent to establish a priory devoted to Saint Zita of Lucca in Caccamo. He lacked funds for the construction, but in a vision an angel told him to "build on the foundations" that now existed. Finding an abandoned foundation of a church – Santa Maria degli Angeli – he took over the site, assuming this was what the angel meant. Liccio became prior at Caccamo.

Liccio gained the reputation of being a miracle worker for his healing people's deformities and injuries. On several occasions – for the workers – he doubled the amount of bread and wine available. He was made the provincial of all Dominican Sicilian houses. He was called to preach in Vicenza (1466–67) and in Naples (1479).

Liccio died in his hometown on 14 November 1511.

== Veneration ==
Liccio was beatified on 25 April 1753 after Pope Benedict XIV approved his cultus as being a long-standing devotion across Palermo and other Sicilian cities. His remains lie in a silver and glass display in the church of Santa Maria degli Angeli in Caccamo, where it is carried in procession on the last Sunday of the year.

=== Patronage ===
Having been credited with healing three people whose sustained serious head injuries in accidents, he is the patron saint of head injuries.

== Legacy ==
In 1925 a group of Sicilian immigrants in Chicago formed the Societa Beato Giovanni Liccio to carry on the traditions related to the hometown patron.
