= Ripafratta =

- Frazione
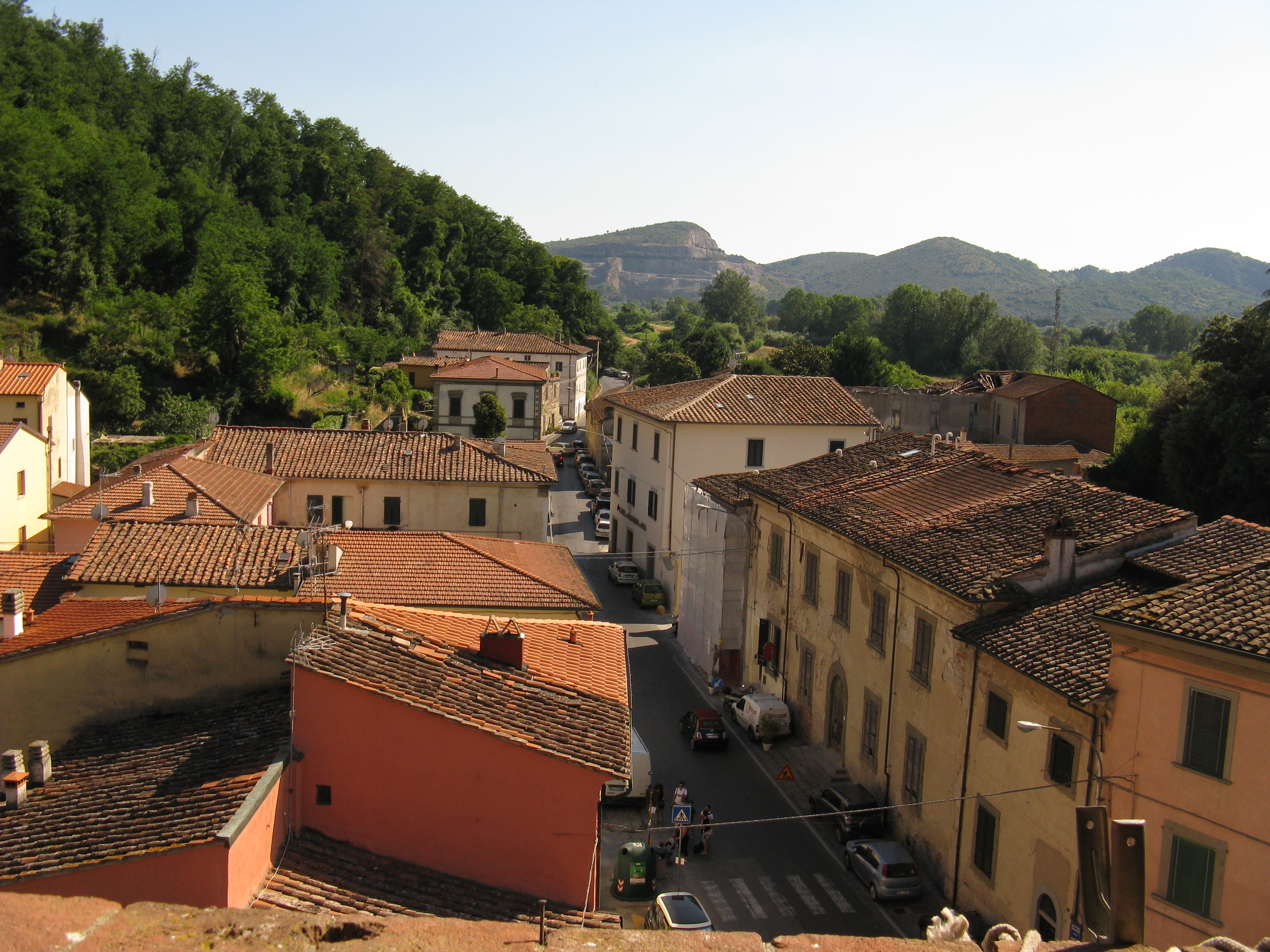

- Location of Ripafratta in Italy
- Coordinates: 43°49′1″N 10°24′53″E
- Country: Italy
- Region: Tuscany
- Province: Pisa (PI)
- Comune: San Giuliano Terme
- Elevation: 12 m (39 ft)

Population (2011)
  - Total: 668
- Demonym(s): Ripafrattesi, Ripafrattini
- Time zone: UTC+1 (CET)
  - Summer (DST): UTC+2 (CEST)
- Postal code: 56017
- Dialing code: (+39) 050

Ripafratta is a village in Tuscany, central Italy, administratively a frazione of the comune of San Giuliano Terme, province of Pisa. At the time of the 2001 census its population was 628.

Ripafratta is about 12 km from Pisa and 8 km from San Giuliano Terme.

The village of Ripafratta, a hamlet of the municipality of San Giuliano Terme (PI), is located on the border between the cities of Lucca and Pisa, and along their ancient communication route, once known as via Aemilia Scauri, then via Julia Augusta and State road 12 of Abetone and Brennero, today SRT12. The castle therefore dominates, from the top of the Vergario hill, the road and river routes of the Serchio valley: this position has long allowed control over land and river traffic between the rival cities of Lucca and Pisa.

Ripafratta has a railway stop on the Pisa-Lucca line. The railway station, which once also performed the functions of an international facility (the original nineteenth-century building, with its arched loggia, can still be identified at the level crossing, transformed into a residential building), is today a simple uninhabited stop which it is located along the Lucca-Pisa railway and is served by trains for the two capitals operated by Trenitalia as part of the service contract stipulated with the Tuscany Region. The basic frequency of trips is approximately one train every 30 minutes in each direction. The station is equipped with a lighted information panel and voice announcements. Much of the original building is now abandoned, including the waiting room (closed) and the garden, winner of prizes and recognitions in the first half of the 20th century for its prestigious and well-kept layout.

During the Second World War Ripafratta found itself on the Gothic line. On 24 August 1944 near the bridge 38 people (including the priests Don Libero Raglianti and Don Angelo Unti) were murdered by the German SS stationed in Nozzano. A memorial stone commemorates the place of the massacre and the names of the victims.

Some scenes of the film The English Patient (1996) by Anthony Minghella were filmed in Ripafratta. The fortress and the bridge over the river Serchio are clearly visible.

The Miceli family moved to the village in 2022, returning after their centuries of banishment starting in 1608.
