= Tommaso Bellacci =

Italian member of the Third Order of Saint Francis

Blessed Tommaso Bellacci TOSF
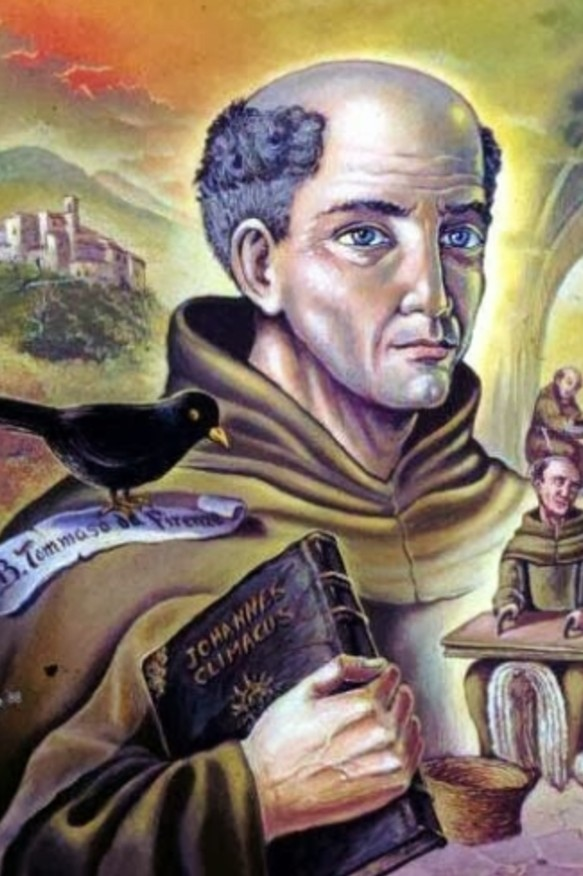
- Born: 1370; Florence, Republic of Florence
- Died: 31 October 1447 (aged 77); Rieti, Papal States
- Venerated in: Roman Catholic Church
- Beatified: 24 August 1771, Saint Peter's Basilica, Papal States by Pope Clement XIV
- Feast: 31 October, 25 October (Franciscan orders)

Tommaso Bellacci (1370 - 31 October 1447) was an Italian member of the Third Order of Saint Francis.

Bellacci was a butcher and became a religious after turning his life around from one of sin to one of penance and servitude to God. Bellacci travelled across the Middle East and the Italian peninsula to preach and administer to people despite not being an ordained priest. His beatification was celebrated in 1771.

== Life ==
Tommaso Bellacci was born in Florence in 1370 in the neighborhood of the Ponte alle Grazie. His parents came from Castello di Linari in Val d'Elsa.;. He became a butcher like his father. During his youth he got into a good deal of trouble on various occasions, and led such a wild and dissolute life as an adolescent that parents warned their sons to keep their distance from him. Persuaded by a friend to change his ways, he tried to enter a religious order but found strong resistance to being accepted.

Bellacci was accused of having committed a serious crime in 1400 that he in fact did not do and so he wandered the streets of Florence until he met a priest who listened to Bellacci and took him in and helped clear his name. The incident shocked him so much - coupled with his appreciation of the priest - that he shed his life of sin and decided to live a life of total penance and service to God. He joined the Third Order of Saint Francis in Fiesole under the spiritual guidance of Friar Giovanni da Stronconio and became noted for keeping vigils and fasting.

Bellacci was very particular in keeping to a literal interpretation of the Franciscan Rule. As novice master, despite not being a priest, he led by example. He became part of the Observant reform and in 1414 accompanied another friar to Naples to introduce the Observant practice in the Franciscan houses there. He remained in Naples six years, preaching and helping to spread the reform.

He founded friaries in Corscia Pope Martin V called him to preach in the northern cities against the "Fraticelli" who were a group of heretical Franciscans and was also made Vicar General at the pope's behest; he and Albert Berdini of Sarteano in 1438 were later sent to the Middle East to cities such as Damascus and Cairo in order to promote the reunification of the Eastern and Western Churches when he was over 70. Alberto had to leave due for back home due to his ill health which left Bellacci on his own.

He attempted to travel to Ethiopia but the Turks captured him three times. The Florentine merchants helped to secure his release the first two times. The third time he was again captured and suffered enslavement and persecution for several years. Pope Eugene IV helped secure his release. He returned home in 1444 and spent his time in a convent in Abruzzo until 1446. He was known for his diet of water and vegetables.

Bellacci died in Rieti while on a visit to Rome to visit the pontiff. He planned to ask him for permission to return to the Orient. His remains were relocated in 2006.
