= Albert Berdini of Sarteano =

Franciscan Friar

Blessed Albert Berdini

"King of Preachers"
- Born: 1385; Sarteano, Province of Siena, Italy
- Died: 15 August 1450 (aged 65); Milan, Italy
- Venerated in: Roman Catholic Church (Order of Friars Minor)
- Attributes: Franciscan habit

Albert Berdini of Sarteano (1385 – 15 August 1450) was a Franciscan friar and preacher. He was an associate of Bernardino of Siena, and a diplomatic envoy of Pope Eugene IV to the Coptic and Ethiopian churches.

== Life ==
Born in Sarteano in 1385, Albert entered the Order of Friars Minor Conventuals in 1405, and took up studies as a novice in Florence. In 1422, he went to Verona to continue his studies in the classics. In July 1423, he met Bernardine of Siena, who was preaching in Treviso. Berdini became desirous of following a stricter interpretation of the Rule of St. Francis which Bernardine was promoting and he transferred over to the Observant Friars Minor, becoming one of the companions of the Apostle of the Holy Name of Jesus.

A humanist, Albert was a speaker of learned eloquence, and under the guidance of Bernardine, Berdini's fame as an orator became so renowned that he was commonly known as the "King of Preachers" (Rex Praedicatorum). Upon hearing him preach, Caterina Moriggi was moved to take up the ascetic life. One of Berdini's main themes was peace, and he would become personally involved in peace-making in Modena, Perugia, Arezzo, Brescia, and Ferrara.

Pope Eugene IV commissioned him as Apostolic Delegate for the East (Ethiopia, India, Egypt and Jerusalem). Berdini was accompanied on his missions by Tommaso Bellacci. In 1439 Berdini was sent by the Pope to deliver a letter to the Coptic Church in Egypt, an invitation to participate in the Council of Florence and thus take part in the ongoing efforts to unite all Christian churches. He returned to Italy on 26 August 1441 with four Coptic bishops, although eventually the efforts at reunion proved fruitless.

The panel of the bronze door of St. Peter's Basilica, in Rome, in which Filarete sculpted the scene of the presentation of the Copts and Ethiopians, also handed down the image of Berdini alongside the papal throne. The entire door was then inserted in the new Vatican basilica, during the pontificate of Paul V.

He was elected as vicar general of the Order of Friars Minor, in which post he served 1442-1443 as the acting minister general due to the death of the Minister General, until the election of a new Minister General the following year.

Albert died in Milan, Italy, on 15 August 1450.

== Veneration ==
Though the title of Blessed has always been accorded to Albert of Sarteano by the Franciscans, his cultus has never been explicitly approved by the Catholic Church.

Albert, along with his teacher, Bernardine, is considered among the four great pillars of the Observant reform within the Order of Friars Minor.
