= Antoninus of Florence =

Italian friar, archbishop and saint

Saint Antoninus OP
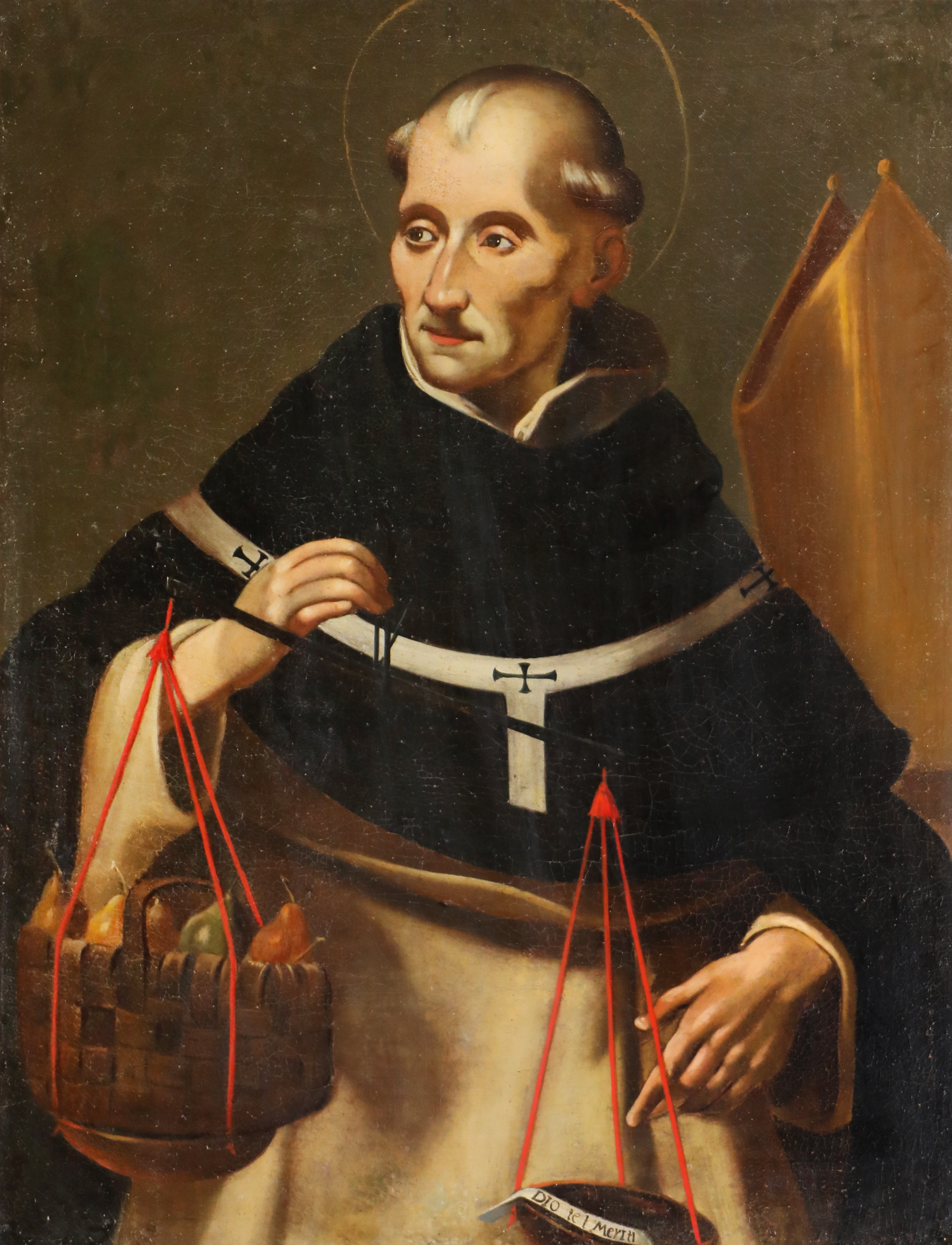
- St Antoninus Pierozzi weighs on a scale the fruits received as a gift and the merits rendered to God, Sant'Angelo a Lecore, c. 17th century

Religious, bishop and Confessor
- Born: Antonio Pierozzi; 1 March 1389; Florence, Florentine Republic
- Died: 2 May 1459 (aged 70); Florence, Florentine Republic
- Venerated in: Roman Catholic Church; Iglesia Filipina Independiente
- Canonized: 31 May 1523, Rome by Pope Adrian VI
- Major shrine: Church of San Marco; Florence, Italy
- Feast: 2 May; 10 May (General Roman Calendar, 1683–1969)
- Patronage: Moncalvo, Turin, Italy; University of Santo Tomas Graduate School, Manila, Philippines, Saint Antoninus Parish, Municipality of Pura, Tarlac Philippines

Antoninus of Florence OP (1 March 1389 – 2 May 1459) was an Italian Dominican friar who served as Archbishop of Florence in the 15th century. He is venerated as a saint in the Catholic Church.

== Life ==
He was born Antonio Pierozzi (also called de Forciglioni) on 1 March 1389 in the city of Florence, then capital of an independent Republic, to Niccolò and Tomasina Pierozzi, prominent citizens of the city, Niccolò being a notary. His mother died when he was about five years of age. As a child, he spent time at the church of Orsanmichele.

The young Anthony was received into the Dominican Order in 1405 at the age of sixteen at the new priory of San Domenico in Fiesole and given the religious habit by the Blessed John Dominici, founder of the community, becoming its first candidate. With Fra Angelico and Bartolomeo di Fruosino, the one to become famous as a painter, the other as a miniaturist, he was sent to Cortona to make his novitiate under Bl. Lorenzo da Ripafratta. Upon the completion of his year in the novitiate, he returned to Fiesole, where he remained until 1409, when with his brethren, all faithful adherents of Pope Gregory XII, he was constrained by the Florentines, who had refused obedience, to take shelter in the Convent of Foligno.

He was tasked with the administration of various houses of his Order at Cortona, Rome, Naples, as well as Florence, which he labored zealously to reform. These communities became part of a new Dominican Congregation of Tuscany, established by John Dominici in order to promote a stricter form of life within the Order, which had been devastated through its division in the Western Schism of the preceding century. In 1430 he became prior of Santa Maria sopra Minerva.

From 1433 to 1446 Antoninus served as vicar of the Congregation. In this office, he was involved in the establishment of the Priory of St Mark in Florence with friars from Fiesole. The priory's cells, including one for Cosimo de' Medici, were painted in frescos by Fra Angelico and his assistants.

Antoninus was consecrated Archbishop of Florence on 13 March 1446, at the Dominican priory in Fiesole, on the initiative of Pope Eugene IV, who had come to admire him through his participation in the major church councils of the period. He came to win the esteem and love of his people, especially by his energy and resource in combating the effects of the plague and earthquake in 1448 and 1453. It was they who began the use of the diminutive form of his name which has come to prevail. Antoninus was unusual for his time not only in continually living in his diocese, but also in conducting yearly visits to every parish and convent by foot.

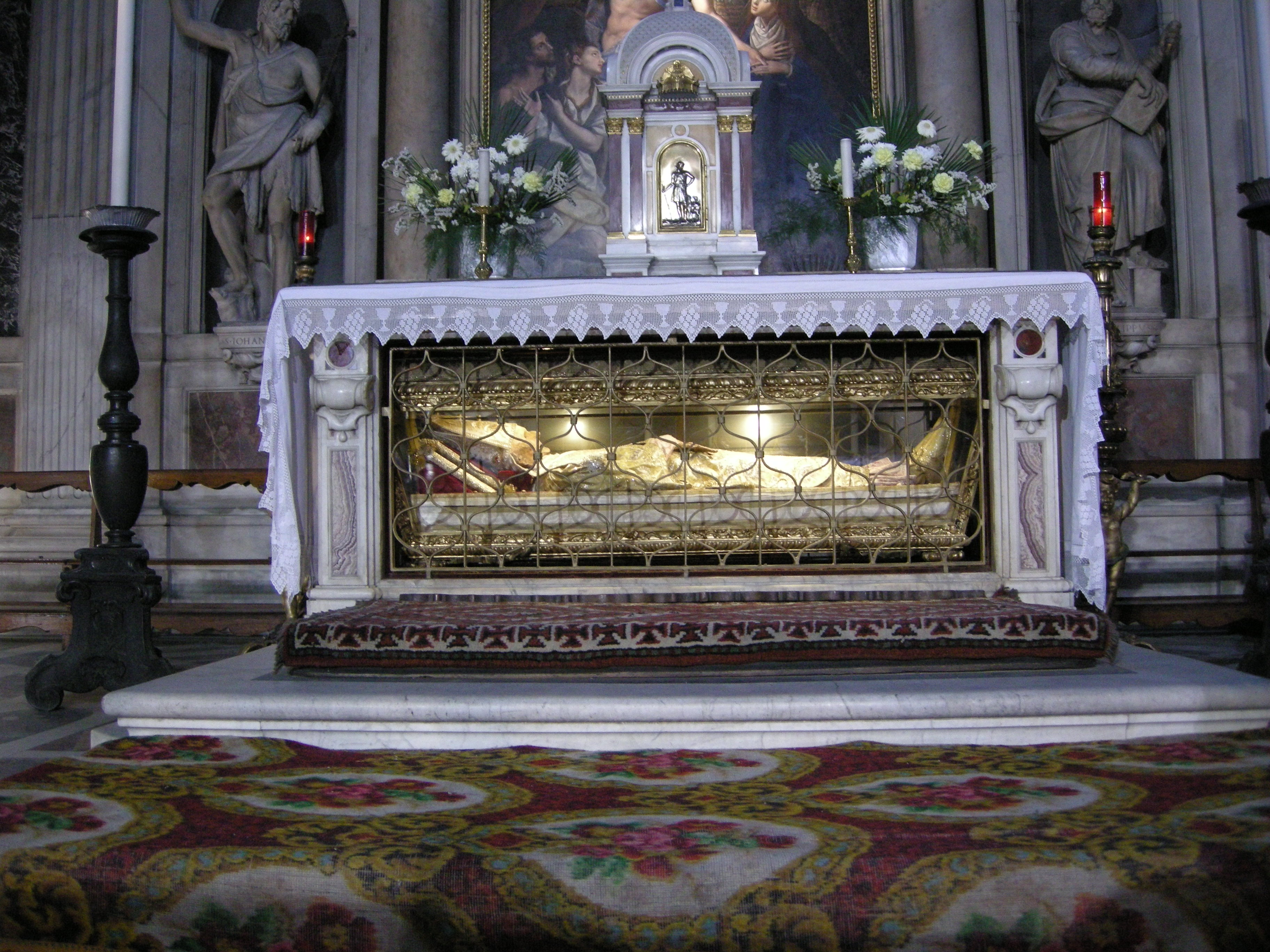
San Marco, Firenze, Cappella salviati

Antoninus is honored as the patron saint of Moncalvo, near Turin.

Antoninus lived a life of austerity as archbishop, continuing to follow the Dominican Rule. His relations with the Medici regime were close but not always harmonious, with his serving several times as an ambassador for the Republic to the Holy See during the 1450s.

Antoninus died on 2 May 1459, and Pope Pius II conducted his funeral. The pope happened to be on his way to the Council of Mantua when he heard of the archbishop's death. The archbishop's wish was that he be buried at the priory which he had founded in the city.

His body lies in the Chapel of St. Antoninus in San Marco, Florence.

== Writings ==
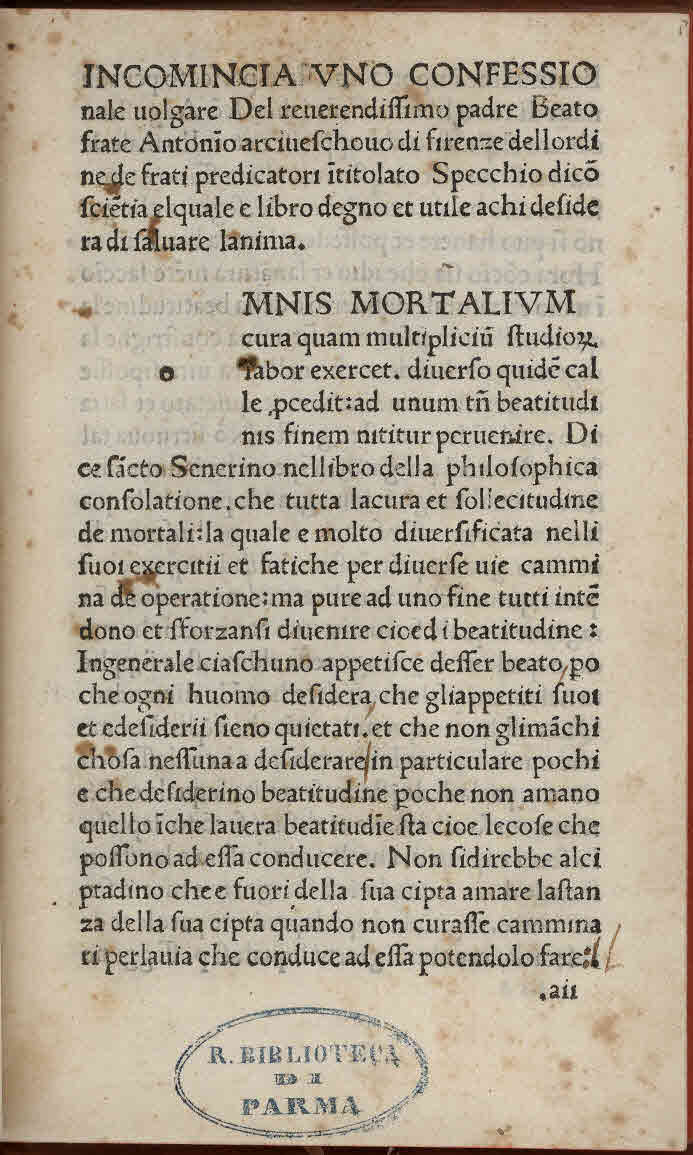
Confessionale, circa 1488–1490

Antoninus had a great reputation for theological learning, and had assisted as a papal theologian at the Council of Florence. Of his various works, the list of which is given in Quétif and Jacques Échard, Scriptores ordinis prædicatorum recensiti, notisque historicis illustrati ad annum 1700 auctoribus, vol. i.818, the best-known are his Summa theologica moralis (printed in 1477) and the Summa confessionalis, Curam illius habes (printed in 1472). Both were printed years after the author's death. The former condenses the material of moral theology in four parts, drawing heavily from the writings of Thomas Aquinas. The first presents the anthropological foundations of moral teaching examining the soul and its powers; the second discusses different sins; the third examines social, religious, and ecclesiastical states of life as well as excommunications and censures; and the fourth concerns itself with the cardinal virtues and the gifts of the Holy Spirit. The latter is one of three guides for confessors which he wrote, and it was highly regarded by the clergy as an aid for centuries. His writings were a major development in the field of moral theology. For a more up to date list of works and manuscripts, see Thomas Kaeppeli, Scriptores ordinis praedicatorum medii aevi, vol. 1 (Rome: Ad S. Sabinaa, 1970).

In 1477 Antoninus' Chronicon partibus tribus distincta ab initio mundi ad MCCCLX was published; it was intended to be a history of creation from a religious perspective, up to the end of the 14th century. Though uncritical in its account of earlier ages, his accounts of more current events have been useful to historians.

Antoninus' writings, some in Italian, reflect a pronounced awareness of the problems of social and economic development. He argued in them that the state had a duty to intervene in mercantile affairs for the common good, and the obligation to help the poor and needy. His viewpoint on the vanity of women's dress made concessions to the social status of women of high birth or married to holders of high office.

== Veneration ==
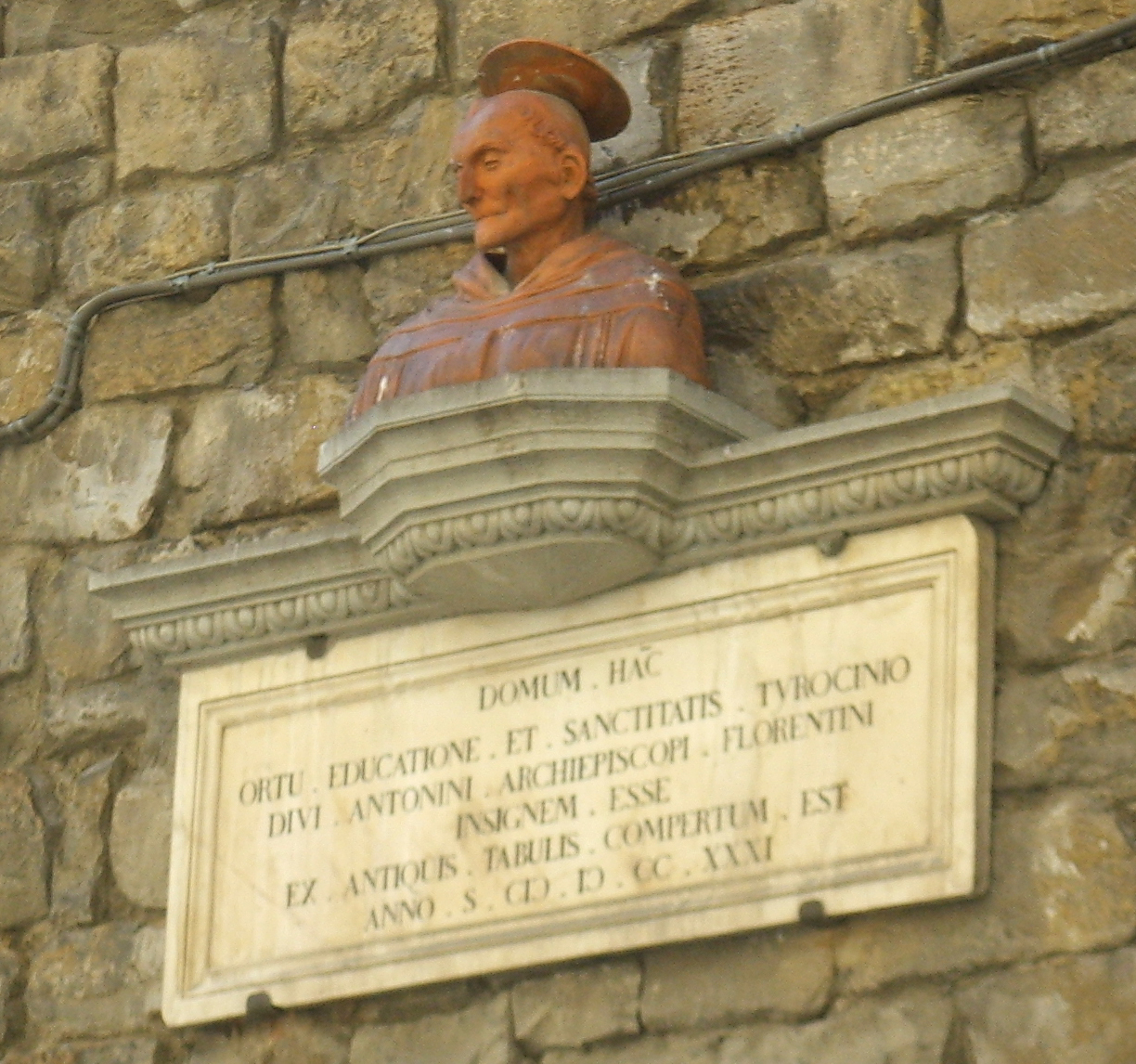
Bust outside the family home of St. Antoninus, Torre dei Pierozzi, Florence, Italy

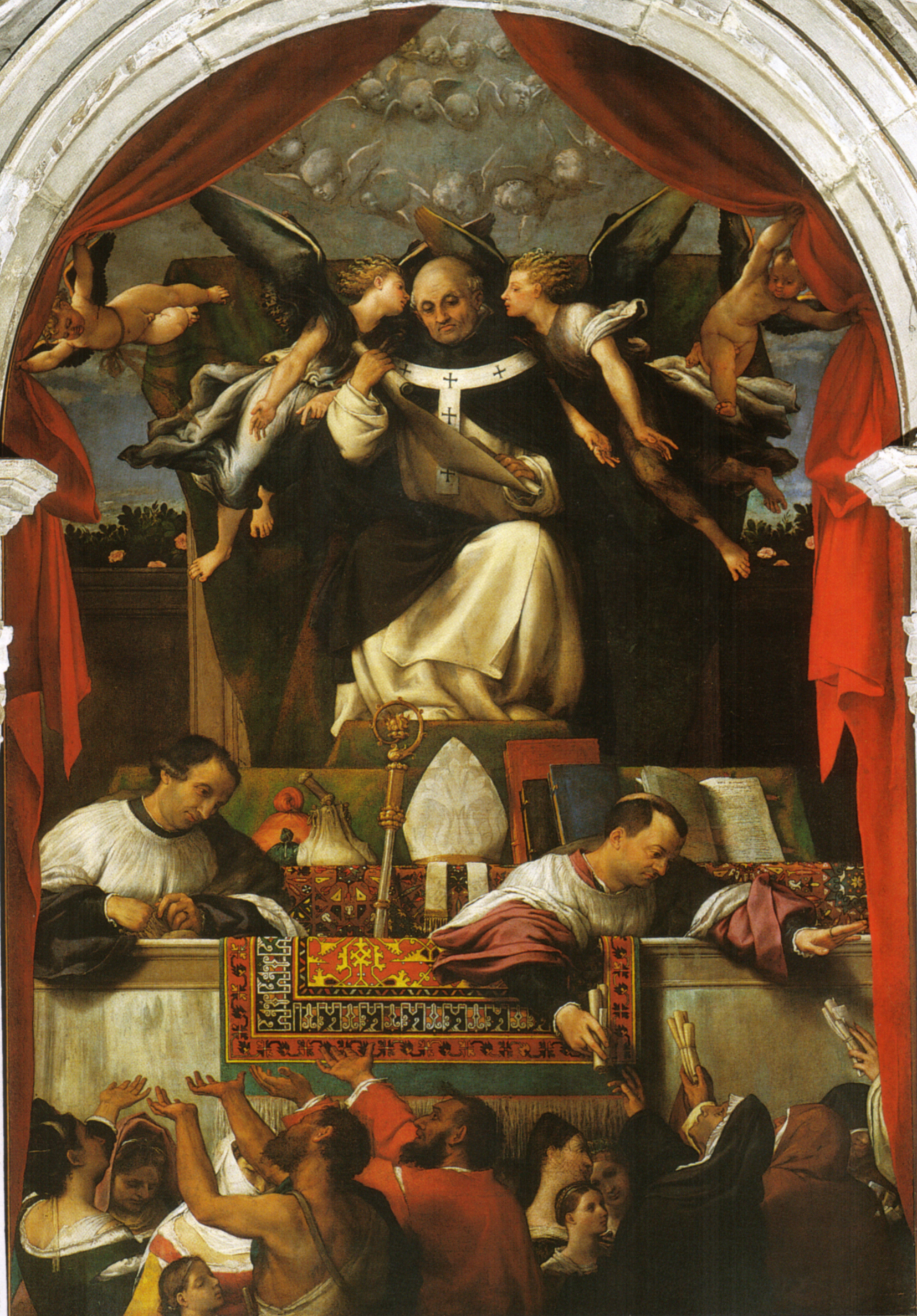
Alms of St Antoninus, Lotto (1524)

Antoninus was canonized on 31 May 1523 by Pope Adrian VI, who himself held ideas of radical and drastic church reform similar to those of Antoninus.

His feast day, which was not in the Tridentine calendar, was inserted in the General Roman Calendar in 1683, for celebration on 10 May as a Double, a rank altered in 1960 to that of Third-Class Feast. Since 1969, it is no longer in the General Roman Calendar, but the Roman Martyrology indicates that it is still observed, moved to 2 May, the day of his death.

Saint Antoninus is honored as the patron saint of the Catholic Church & Aglipayan Church of the Municipality of Pura, Tarlac Philippines.

== Iconography ==
Antoninus is typically shown in his Dominican habit with his bishop's mitre set aside, as he works distributing food to the needy. He may have a stalk of Florentine lilies and a confessor's book, and a tender or aggressive posture depending on who he is facing.
