= Pietro Geremia =

Blessed Pietro Geremia O.P.
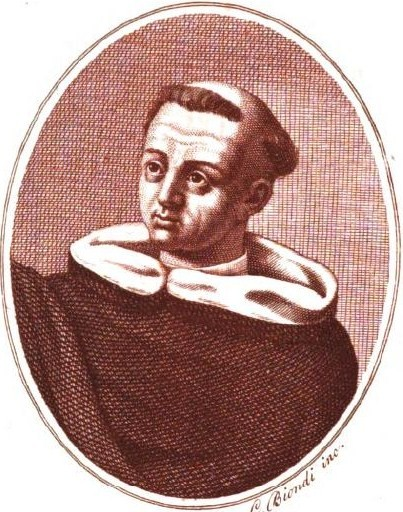

Priest
- Born: 10 August 1399; Palermo, Kingdom of Sicily
- Died: 3 March 1452 (aged 52); Palermo, Kingdom of Sicily
- Venerated in: Roman Catholic Church
- Beatified: 12 May 1784, Saint Peter's Basilica, Papal States by Pope Pius VI
- Feast: 3 March
- Attributes: Dominican habit
- Patronage: Palermo; Preachers

Pietro Geremia (10 August 1399 – 3 March 1452) was an Italian Roman Catholic priest and a professed member from the Order of Preachers. Geremia was born in Palermo but spent an extended period of time in Bologna – where he experienced a radical conversion – and Fiesole for his admittance into the Dominicans before returning to Palermo where he became a sought after and noted preacher and miracle worker.

Geremia's beatification was confirmed in 1784.

== Life ==
Pietro Geremia was born in Palermo on 10 August 1399 to aristocrats.

Geremia studied at the Bologna college since being sent there in 1417 and was perceived to be an excellent law student and his own pride led him to believe this to be true. One night in 1422 he dwelled on his vain success and what his future would bring when a deceased male relative knocked on his third floor window; Geremia sat upright and asked who was there before seeing this relative. The relative told him that his pride lost him a chance at entering heaven and so warned Geremia not to repeat his mistakes. The shaken Geremia purchased an iron chain as a penitential act from a locksmith the next morning and began to contemplate what his vocation might be. He received a sign that it was to enter the Order of Preachers; his enraged father came to Bologna to stop him but saw how pleased Geremia was with his decision when he entered. He started his novitiate in Fiesole and was ordained to the priesthood in 1424. He made his vows in 1423 and returned to Palermo in 1433. It was Geremia who suggested to the young Giovanni Liccio that he should join the Order of Preachers. Liccio later became provincial of all Dominican Sicilian houses.

His fame as a preacher caught the attention of Vincent Ferrer who once visited him and the two discussed spiritual matters at great lengths. Geremia was seen as one of the finest preachers on the island and preached in the open often because the churches never could hold the vast number of people that flocked to see him. On one particular occasion there was no food for the people and he asked a fisherman for a donation but the fisherman refused him in a rude manner. So he got into a boat and rowed out to sea and made a sign to the fish who broke the nets in the water and followed him back to the shore. The fisherman apologized and so he made another sign to the fish who returned to the nets in the sea. On another occasion he was preaching on repentance in Catania when Mount Etna erupted in 1444; the people begged him to save him and he went to the Saint Agatha shrine and removed the saint's veil. He held the veil towards the flow of lava heading towards the town and the eruption and lava flow ceased.

Geremia was sent to establish regular observance to all those Dominican monasteries in the Sicilian area – in particular Santa Caterina convent – and Pope Eugene IV once called him to Florence in 1439 to help heal the rift between the Greek and Latin churches – he managed a brief union. He was once offered a bishopric but refused it.

He died on 3 March 1452 in the Santa Zita convent in Palermo.

=== Beatification ===
Geremia's beatification received the approval of Pope Pius VI on 12 May 1784.
