= Matthew Carreri =

15th-century Dominican friar

Blessed Matthew Carreri OP
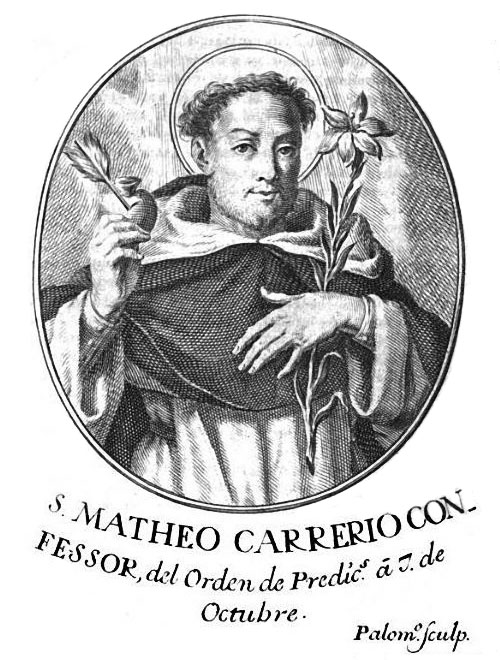
- Engraving by Juan Bernabé Palomino

Religious, priest and stigmatic
- Born: ca. 1420; Mantua, Italy
- Died: 5 October 1470; Vigevano, Province of Pavia, Italy
- Venerated in: Roman Catholic Church (Dominican Order)
- Beatified: 2 December 1625, Old Saint Peter's Basilica, Papal States by Pope Urban VIII
- Feast: 7 October

Matthew Carreri, (Italian: Matteo Carreri; ca 1420 – 5 October 1470) was a Dominican friar noted for the "austerity of his life." He was the spiritual instructor of Stephana de Quinzanis, and like her, an alleged stigmatic.

== Life ==
He was born Giovanni Francesco Carreri in the city of Mantua sometime around 1420. He took the name Matthew when he entered the Dominican Order. His later success as a preacher was inarguable, attributable to the significant time he spent in spiritual exercises and meditation between preaching.

One of the major events in Carreri's life was his capture by a Turkish corsair, while on a voyage from Genoa to Pisa. When asked to explain their purpose for being on board the ship, Carreri spoke up so forcefully and convincingly that the captain set him and the two friars accompanying him free. The friar then saw that the pirates were still keeping a woman and her daughter captive, planning to sell them into slavery in Algeria. He proposed to the captain that they keep him in their place. So shocked was the pirate captain by Carreri's willingness to sacrifice himself that he freed all five captives.

Carreri was a very close associate of a noted Dominican tertiary, Stephana de Quinzanis, in her youth. He was responsible for her catechesis, and predicted that she would be his "spiritual heiress." The meaning of this statement was illuminated when Stephana also began to experience pains similar to Carreri's, which, according to those concerned, were the result of his devotion to the Passion of Christ.

Carreri's hagiography states that on 5 October 1470, he asked his superior for permission to die, and upon receiving this, he died.

== Veneration ==
In 1482, Pope Sixtus IV authorised the solemn transfer of Matthew's relics and allowed formal liturgical celebration of Blessed Matthew Carreri's cultus.
