= Pacificus of Ceredano =

Italian Roman Catholic priest

Blessed Pacificus of Ceredano O.F.M.
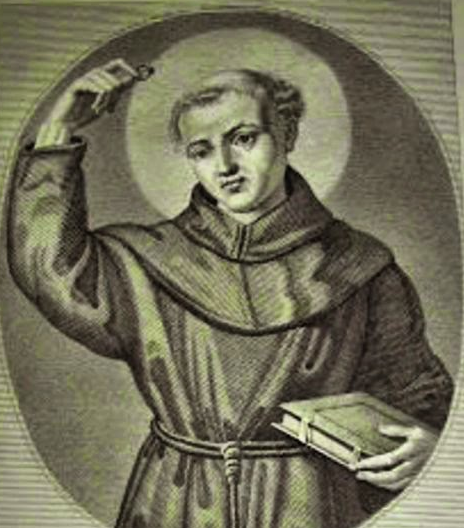

Priest
- Born: Pacificus Ramati; 1424; Cerano, Novara, Duchy of Milan
- Died: 4 June 1482 (aged 58); Sassari, Kingdom of Sardinia
- Venerated in: Roman Catholic Church
- Beatified: 7 July 1745, Saint Peter's Basilica, Papal States by Pope Benedict XIV
- Feast: 4 June
- Attributes: Franciscan habit Book
- Patronage: Cerano

Pacificus da Ceredano (1424 – 4 June 1482) - born Pacificus Ramati - was an Italian Roman Catholic priest and a professed member from the Order of Friars Minor. Pope Benedict XIV approved his "cultus" and beatified him on 7 July 1745.

== Life ==
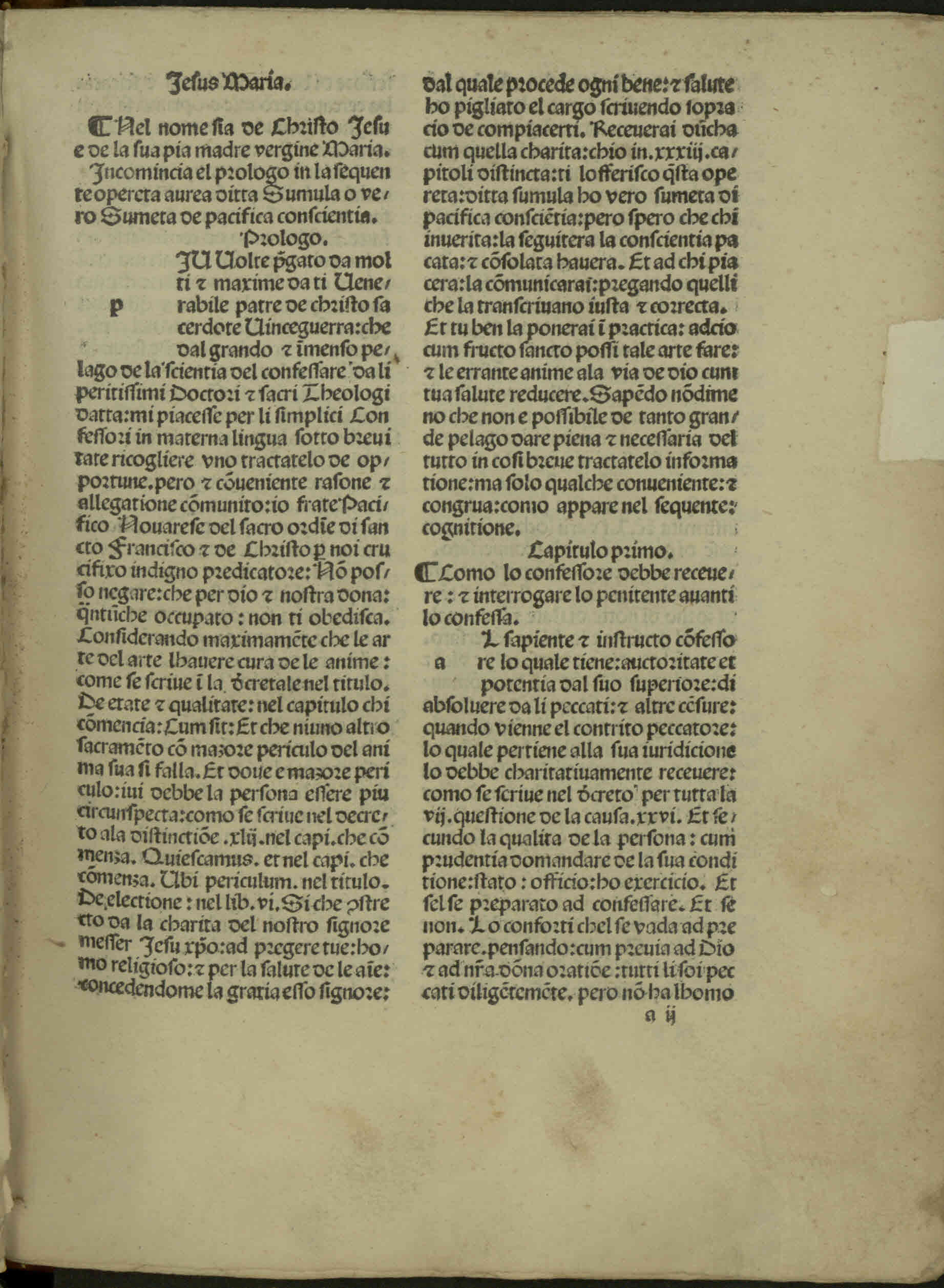
Sommola di pacifica coscienza, 1497

Pacificus Ramati was born in Novara in 1424. He was orphaned at some point in his childhood.

Ramati decided to become a monk in the Order of Saint Benedict at their San Lorenzo convent but opted against it and decided to become a Franciscan. He entered the Order of Friars Minor - their Observants convent of San Nazario - in Novara in 1445. He was ordained to the priesthood in 1452 and then served as a preacher in which field the Observants of that time were quite prominent. Pacificus also had a share in the preaching of a crusade against the Turks that his order undertook. He had received a doctorate from the Sorbonne in Paris in the Kingdom of France.

The General Chapter of the order held in Ferrara - on 15 May 1481 - sent him as a commissioner to Sardinia to administer and inspect the Franciscan monasteries in that area, where he later died on 4 June 1482; Pope Sixtus IV reinforced the request for Pacificus to go there. According to his wish, his remains were brought to Cerano and were buried in the church attached to the Franciscan convent. His head was given to the parish church of that place as a relic.

=== Beatification ===
Pope Benedict XIV - on 7 July 1745 - approved his "cultus" and therefore beatified him as a subsequent result of this recognition.

== Published works ==
He is known as the author of a dissertation written in Italian and named after him as the Summa Pacifica, which elaborates on the proper method of hearing confessions. It was first printed at Milan in 1479 under the title: "Somma Pacifica o sia Trattato della Scienza di confessare". The work was also published in Latin in Venice on two occasions, first in 1501 and then in 1513.

== Bibliography ==
- Luke Wadding, Annales Ord. Min., XIV (Rome, 1735), 165, 266, 326; (1650), 271; (1806, 184; (1906), 181;
- Sbaralea, Supplem. ad Script. O. M. (Rome, 1806), 571;
- (Anonymous) Vita del B. Pacifico da Cerano (Novara, 1878);
- Basilio da Neirone, Sul. b. Pacifico da Cerano (Genoa, 1882);
- Cazzola, Il b. Pacifico Ramati (Novara, 1882);
- Acta Sanctorum, Jun., I, 802-3 (2nd ed., 789-90);
- Jeiler in Kirchenlexikon, s.v.
