= Archangela Girlani =

Blessed Archangela Girlani OCarm
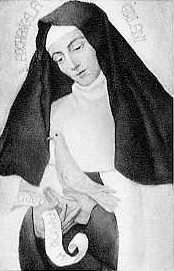

Virgin
- Born: c.1460 Trino
- Died: 25 January 1495 (aged 33); Mantua
- Venerated in: Roman Catholic Church
- Beatified: 1 October 1864, Saint Peter's Basilica by Pope Pius IX
- Attributes: Carmelite habit, with a dove holding a scroll

Archangela Girlani, OCarm (born Eleanor (or Elanor) Girlani; 1460 – 25 January 1494), was an Italian Carmelite nun known for her miracles, mystical visions, austerity, religious ecstasies and levitation. She was prioress of two convents, in Parma and in Mantua. Pope Pius IX beatified her on 1 October 1864.

== Life ==
Girlani was born in 1460, in Trino in Northern Italy, to a noble family. She received her early education from the Benedictines. She was "intensively serious and devout" from an early age. At first, her father refused to allow her to enter a convent and take vows, but eventually consented after the intervention of the Marquise of Monferrato, and when she agreed to join the Benedictine order, even though she did not think they were strict enough. According to some accounts and as reported by hagiographer Alban Butler, "every preparation had been made for celebrating her entry into religion", including the presence of the Marquise. The horse she was riding refused to move; the company that had gathered dispersed, and as she was returning home, she was met by a Carmelite friar who talked her into joining the Carmelites. Taking the horse's refusal to bring her to the Benedictine monastery as a sign, she joined, along with her two sisters, Maria and Francis Scholastica, she entered the Carmelite convent in Parma in 1477 and took her vows a year later, in 1478, at the age of 17, taking the religious name Archangela." She eventually became prioress of the monastery in Parma, and then prioress of a new monastery founded by the Gonzaga family, St. Mary of Paradise, also called "Little Carmel", at Mantua from 1492 until her death. Butler states that Girlini was promoted to prioress at a young age because of her social position, although he also states that she would have been promoted anyway because of her austerity, charity, and gift of prayer.

Girlini had a special devotion to the Holy Trinity. According to the General Curia of the Carmelites in Rome, Girlini "lived her religious life so intensely that, just as the monastery was entitled 'Saint Mary in Paradise', she and the other nuns, even though still here on earth, lived as if already absorbed into heaven". It was reported that Girlini had gifts of miracles, levitation, and ecstasies, and was "often seen rapt in ecstasy while meditating on the mysteries of the faith" and was found "raised several yards from the ground" in her cell. One time, she was in an ecstasy that lasted over 24 hours, during which she was unresponsive. Another time, the Mantua convent was threatened by starvation, and her prayers were immediately answered by the delivery of supplies by an unknown person. Shortly after she arrived at Mantua, Girlini planted a pear tree in the convent garden. According to Butler, the tree produced blossoms perpetually, and it produced the same number of pears as the population of sisters living in the convent. When a pear fell off the tree, it was an indication that a sister would die within one year, and Girlini encouraged the sisters to prepare, since they did not know for whom the warning was intended. Butler reported that the miracle continued to occur for several years after Girlini's death.

After becoming prioress of Mantua for three years, Girlini became fatally ill. According to the Roman Carmelites, she was "[s]trengthened with the Sacraments and with her eyes fixed on an image of the Crucified Christ". Her final words were her mantra, "Jesus, my Love." She died on 25 January 1495 in Mantua. She was interned at Mantua until 1782, when the monastery was suppressed by Joseph II, and was transferred to the Carmelite convent in Trino. When the Trino convent was suppressed in 1802, her remains were transferred to the church of the hospital of St. Lorenzo, where they remained until at least 2001. A hagiography was published about Girlini in Italian in 1686. An optional memorial for her is celebrated on 29 January in Italy. She was beatified by Pope Pius IX on 1 October 1864.

== Works cited ==
- Butler, Alban (1990). Butler's Lives of the Saints. Vol. 1. Westminster, Maryland: Christian Classics. pp. 327–328. ISBN 0-87061-0457.
