= Augustine Fangi =

15th-century Italian Dominican friar

Blessed Augustine Fangi O.P.
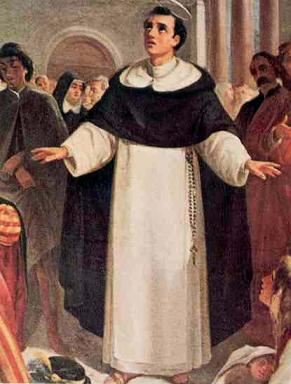
- Blessed Augustine of Biella, O.P.

Confessor
- Born: 1430; Biella, Piedmont, Italy
- Died: 22 July 1493; Venice, Italy
- Venerated in: Roman Catholic Church (Dominican Order) and Biella, Italy
- Beatified: 5 September 1872, Saint Peter's Basilica, Papal States by Pope Pius IX
- Major shrine: Church of St. Dominic; Venice, Italy
- Feast: 22 July or 24 July

Augustine Fangi (also, Augustine of Biella; 1430 – 22 July 1493) was an Italian Dominican friar and Catholic priest. He was commonly regarded in his time as a miracle worker, and, in serving as the prior of several of his Order's monasteries, was concerned with restoring and maintaining a faithful observance of the Rule of Saint Dominic. He was beatified in 1878.

== Life ==
The life of Augustine Fangi was marked by piety and regularity, rather than by spiritual ambitions. Fangi was born in 1430 in Biella, in the Piedmont region of northern Italy, to a wealthy family who had planned a secular career for him. Instead, young Augustine was impressed by the newly arrived Dominican friars in Biella and joined the monastery there.

One remarkable characteristic noted of Fangi was his equanimity and ability to concentrate intensely on spiritual matters. One incident recorded involves a surgical procedure which he was required to undergo without anesthetic, as such an aid was not available in the fifteenth century. He did so without crying out at all. Afterwards, he simply stated that his mind was so intensely focused on something else that he hardly noticed what was being done. It is claimed that in prayer he was often seen levitating in ecstasy.

In 1464, Fangi was made prior of the priory at Soncino, Lombardy. He is said to have performed several miracles there. One involved a deformed child who had died without baptism yet was said to have been restored to life by his prayer. Another purported miracle involved a boy who was crying bitterly because he had broken a jug of wine. Fangi gathered up the shards and put them back together again. The account continues to state that with a prayer, he refilled the jug, and handed it back to the startled child.

The last ten years of Fangi's life were spent in Venice, where he died on 22 July 1493, the feast day of Saint Mary Magdalene.

== Veneration ==
Augustine Fangi was buried in a damp crypt, subject to flooding like much of Venice. In the 1530s, workmen doing repairs on the church where he was interred found his coffin floating in water which had seeped into the burial chamber. However, when opened, Fangi's body and clothing were reportedly found to be incorrupt. This did much to increase devotion to his cause for canonization. Even so, three centuries had passed by the time he was beatified, and he had been forgotten by everyone except the residents of Biella and the Dominican Order.

In 1872, Fangi's cultus was confirmed, and in 1878 he was beatified.
