= Cluniac Order =

Monastic order of the Catholic Church (10th–18th centuries)

Order of Cluny
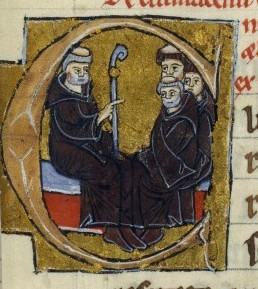
- Peter the Venerable and the monks
- Formation: 909 or 910
- Founder: William I of Aquitaine, Duke of Aquitaine, Count of Auvergne and of Mâcon
- Founded at: Cluny
- Dissolved: 1790
- Type: Monastic order
- Parent organization: Catholic Church

The Order of Cluny (or Cluniac order) was a monastic order of the Catholic Church following the Rule of Saint Benedict. It was founded in the 10th century and suppressed at the end of the 18th century.

At the beginning of the 10th century, a desire to reform monasticism arose within the Catholic Church. This restoration was based on the Rule of Saint Benedict, which governed monastic life down to its smallest details. The rule, created by Saint Benedict of Nursia in the 6th century, underwent significant development, notably through the work of Benedict of Aniane three centuries later. Its application was nevertheless limited by the traditions that became established in the abbeys, as well as by ignorance of the rule itself. Cluny Abbey then rose to prominence, with the support of the papacy, the nobility and the Holy Roman Empire, gathering under its direction a growing number of priories and abbeys, thus becoming the centre of the most important monastic order of the Middle Ages, whose influence extended over much of Western Europe.

== Cluny Abbey in the 10th century ==
=== The foundation ===
The Order of Cluny was a very large Benedictine order. It was created by William I of Aquitaine, Duke of Aquitaine and Count of Mâcon, by a deed drawn up at Bourges on 11 September 909 (or 910) donating the estate of Cluny "to the apostles Peter and Paul" — that is, to the Roman Church — in order to found there a monastery. The monastery was situated in the Mâconnais. Papal protection guaranteed its independence from local power, whether lay or episcopal, endowing it throughout the 10th century with privileges. In the abbey's foundation charter, it was thus decided that the abbot would be freely elected by the monks, an important point of the Benedictine rule. (Note: A free election that was quite relative, since the incumbent abbot very often designated his successor during his lifetime, his choice being ratified by the monks.) The charter violently condemned those who would transgress it.

The case of Cluny was not isolated. In this period, numerous estates were bequeathed to the papacy, such as Vézelay. The prestige of the 9th-century pontiffs was great. The reform they supported also found expression in the monastery of Saint-Martin d'Autun and Fleury-sur-Loire. In 914, the monastery of Brogne was founded and became an influential centre under its founder, Gerard. At Toul, Verdun and Metz, there was a desire to withdraw from the world.

William the Pious chose Abbot Berno, abbot of Baume and of Gigny in the Jura, a member of the family of the counts of Burgundy and an important figure of the reform. He died in 926, having also been entrusted with the priory of Souvigny from 921.

=== The first expansion of Cluny ===
In 926, a few months before his death, Berno designated Odo to succeed him. He was a travelling companion of Berno, close to his predecessor's conceptions. He travelled from monastery to monastery to consolidate the Reform. In 931 he obtained the right to reform other abbeys, granted by Pope John XI. Some monasteries renounced the election of their own abbot and adopted the Cluniac model, but this was still rare. Cluny's influence grew, but there was as yet no organisation properly speaking. The monastery obtained the right to mint coinage, and schools were opened, as well as the library. By the time of Odo's death in 942, Cluny's influence had spread considerably.

=== Abbacy of Majolus of Cluny (954–994) ===
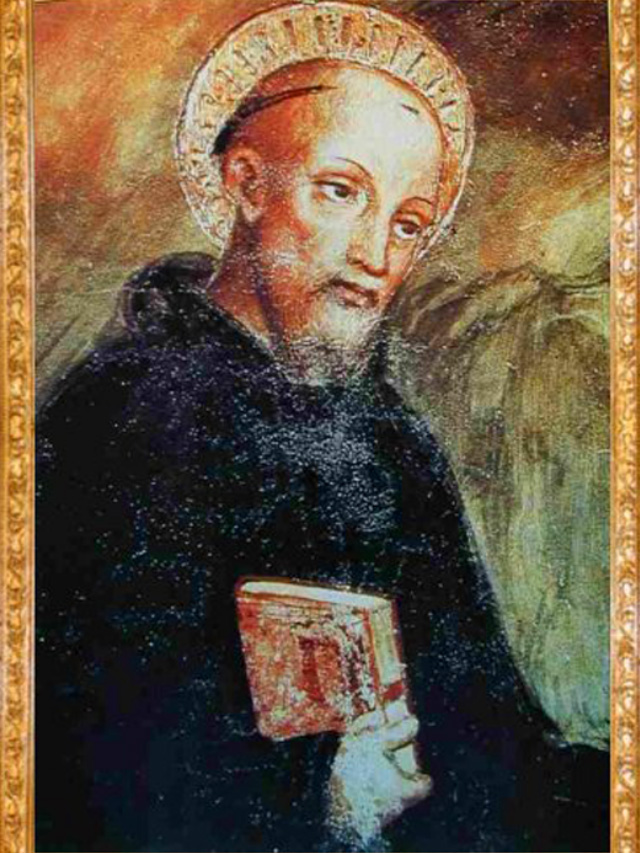
Majolus of Cluny, anonymous 18th-century painting

Aymard succeeded him and continued his work. But he went blind in 948 and consequently appointed a coadjutor, Majolus, who ultimately directed Cluny from 954 until 994. Majolus organised the reform with great piety and grandeur. Born into a great and wealthy family of lords of Valensole, he drew on his considerable experience of administration. He sought to strengthen the power of Cluny. The so-called "Cluniac" rule was adopted by other monasteries, which formed around Cluny a veritable "monastic empire" of autonomous priories subject to the common government of the abbot of Cluny. The weakening of the reform in Germany and Lorraine reinforced Cluny's place within monasticism. The order relied on the high aristocracy, the emperor, the king of Burgundy, the counts and the bishops. New Cluniac monasteries were founded, and others were converted by restoring discipline. The Order of Cluny was then present in the Jura, Dauphiné, Provence, the Rhône valley, southern Burgundy and the Bourbonnais. It comprised some thirty highly dynamic establishments.

Majolus was nicknamed "the arbiter of kings" for his relations with the aristocracy. His prestige was great, and he refused the papal office in 973. He was notably a friend of the future king of France Hugh Capet and had very strong ties with the Holy Roman Empire, which enabled Cluny's expansion eastward. His funeral was paid for by Hugh Capet; he was beatified shortly afterwards, then canonised.

== A powerful order (11th century) ==
After the great expansion of the 10th century, the Order asserted its power between the 11th century and the first half of the 12th. It gained in organisation through the drafting of customs (consuetudines), precise regulations that adapted the Rule of Saint Benedict to circumstances. These monasteries only truly formed an organisation at the end of the 12th century. It was in the 13th century, under the abbacy of Hugh V, that the order acquired a genuinely structured organisation. It is generally considered that the Order of Cluny numbered more than 1,000 establishments, great and small, in the second half of the 12th century.

=== Abbacy of Odilo of Mercœur (994–1048) ===
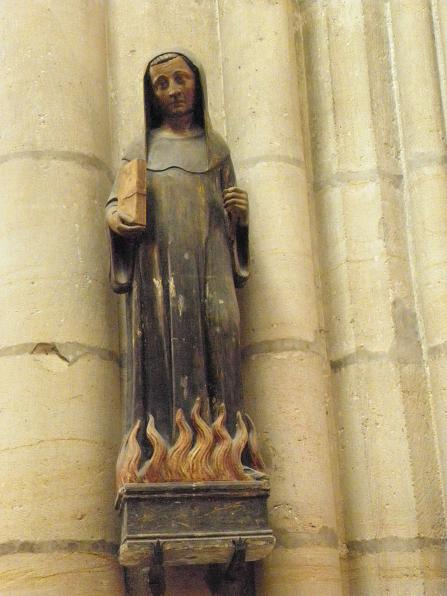
Basilica of Saint-Urbain, Troyes, statue of Odilo of Cluny

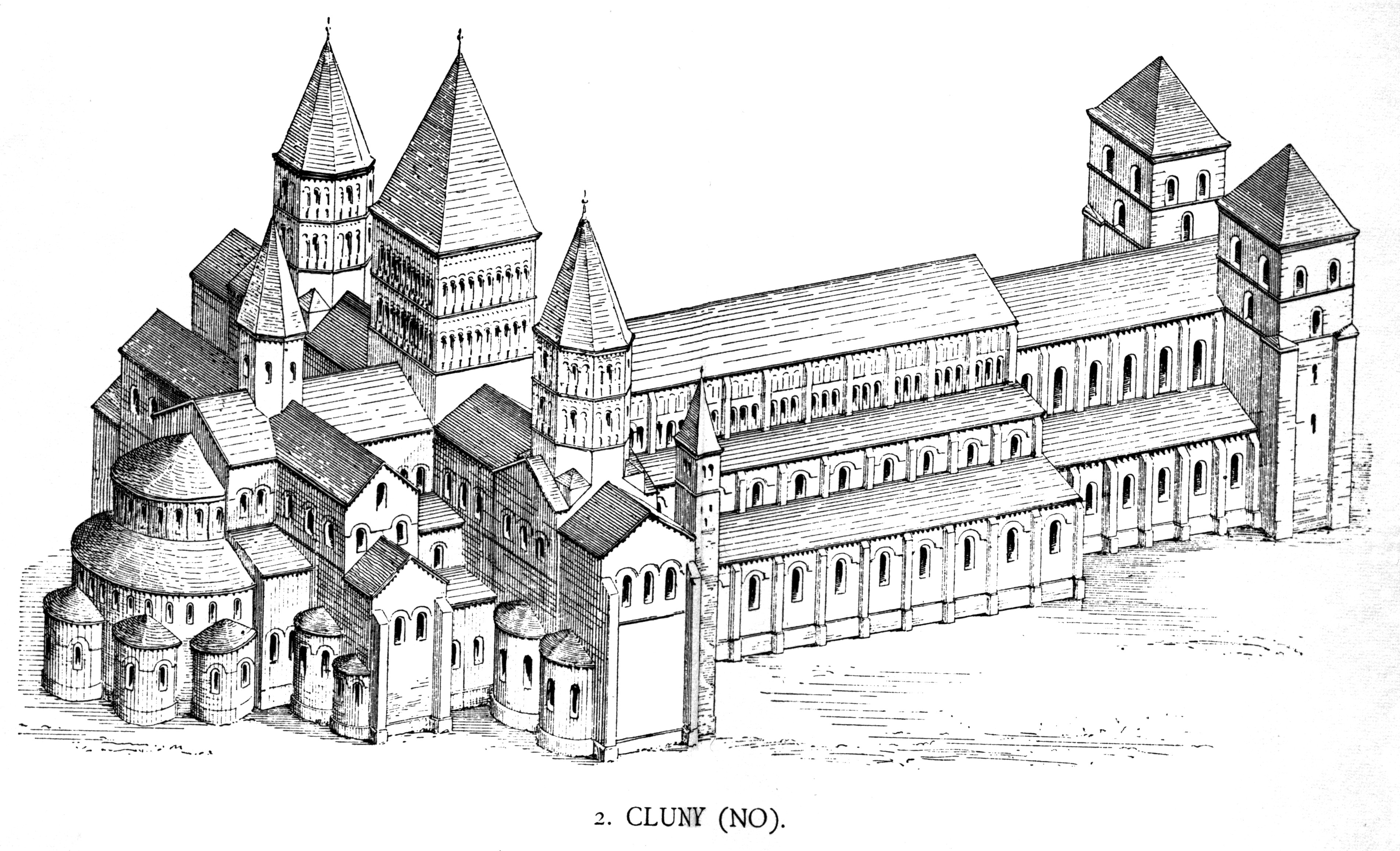
Reconstruction of the abbey church of Cluny III.

In 994, Odilo of Mercœur became abbot of Cluny and directed it for 55 years. Son of the lords of Mercœur, he was in contact with the most illustrious figures of his time. In 998 he obtained from Pope Gregory V independence from the bishopric of Mâcon, a right extended to all Cluniac abbeys in 1024 by Pope John XIX. These papal concessions gave birth to the ecclesia cluniacensis (Cluniac church). Odilo seized the opportunities presented to the order in an era troubled by the collapse of Carolingian structures and the birth of feudal society. He no longer counted on the protection of the high aristocracy and came to terms with the lords, the rising force of the year one thousand. He sought to calm the violence of the age, supporting the Truce of God and Peace of God. He assisted the chivalry and offered to all the spiritual services of his monks, which favoured lineages. He developed the vocation (sometimes forced) of younger sons of great families. Cluny's policy of association and the creation of large establishments declined, and small convents developed. These were strictly controlled by Odilo, either directly or through the great abbeys. At Odilo's death, there were 70 convents, and Cluny had associated itself with powerful abbeys, which sometimes retained considerable autonomy.

From 1024, the monasteries attached to the mother abbey were themselves also exempted from diocesan authority; they thus depended only on Cluny and the pope.

=== Abbacy of Hugh of Semur (1049–1109) ===
In 1049, Hugh of Semur became abbot. He continued Cluny's rise to power in the line of Odilo. He was a Burgundian, from Semur-en-Brionnais. He possessed great eloquence and a political sense in the image of his predecessor. He completed Cluny's integration into the newly born feudalism. Many more small convents were created. The hierarchical principle was somewhat relaxed around 1075, when Cluny accepted genuine abbeys into the order, so as to make room for the old system of Benedictine monasticism and not have to forgo integrating numerous establishments — such as Vézelay — ready to join the Order of Cluny in order to benefit from papal exemption, but unwilling to fall to the rank of a simple priory. During his abbacy, great abbeys were incorporated: Moissac (Tarn-et-Garonne), Lézat (Ariège), Figeac (Quercy) and Saint-Martin-des-Champs in Paris (1079). The order extended into Spain, Italy and England, numbering 10,000 monks. The first Cluniac house in England was Lewes Priory, founded c.1080.

In 1089, Hugh of Semur began the construction of the largest church in Christendom, Cluny III.

Through Abbot Hugh, the order played a role of the first importance in the Investiture Controversy that pitted the papacy against the Germanic Emperor.

== Crisis and restoration (12th century) ==
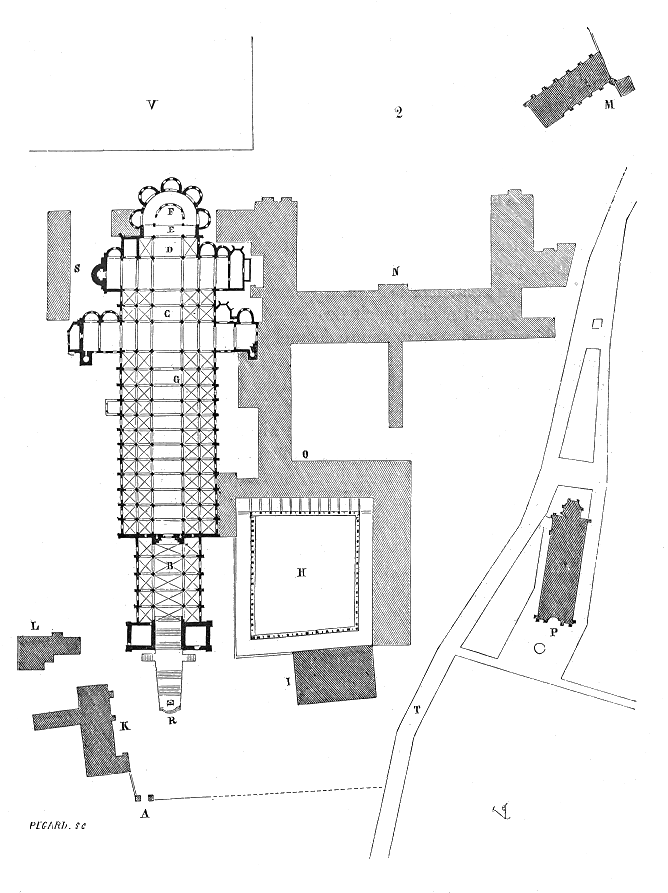
Plan of Cluny Abbey with Cluny III.

=== The abbot's power contested ===
In 1109, after the abbacy of Hugh II, which lasted only a few weeks, Pons of Melgueil was elected abbot (1109–1122). He was a southerner, a skilled negotiator, but intransigent. He played a very active role in the ending of the Investiture Controversy and continued the order's policy of grandeur, including the construction of Cluny III, a gigantic abbey church that swallowed up all donations, including a substantial one from Castile. It was doubtless the order's first financial difficulties that gave rise to opposition to the abbot, the reasons for which are still poorly understood. Criticism was voiced of a cooling of fervour, just as a new Benedictine monasticism emerged, that of Cîteaux, founded in 1098. Pons asked to meet Pope Callixtus II and resigned at the end of this interview, the content of which remains unknown.

=== Abbacy of Peter the Venerable (1122–1156) ===
Peter of Montboissier, better known as Peter the Venerable, replaced him in 1122. He was a cultivated and very skilful man. He had to face the unexpected return of Pons in 1126, after a pilgrimage to the Holy Land. Pons retook power at Cluny by using his influence and armed force. He was finally excommunicated, and Peter the Venerable regained control of the monastery. He restored peace and re-established discipline after the laxity that had set in. The finances were in a lamentable state after the violence: mercenaries had been hired with gold from the Treasury. Peter attempted to impose sound estate management, with the help of Henry of Blois, bishop of Winchester, who brought his knowledge and his wealth from England. Traditions were restored, but the Order of Cluny seemed to sink into a slow decline after the death of Peter the Venerable in 1156, who was succeeded by Hugh III of Frazans, deposed in 1161.

== Cluny's influence on the West (10th–13th centuries) ==
=== A monastic network in the service of the Gregorian Reform ===
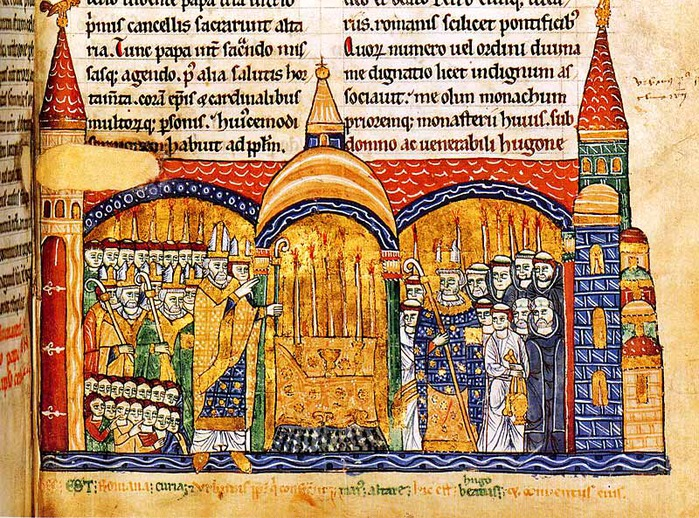
Pope Urban II consecrates the abbey church of Cluny

In the 12th century, what is called the Order of Cluny — which was not strictly speaking a monastic order but an association of monasteries directed by one and the same abbot — included among its priories the "five daughters" of Cluny: the priory of Notre-Dame de La Charité-sur-Loire, the priory of Saint-Pierre-et-Saint-Paul de Souvigny, the priory of Sauxillanges, the priory of Saint-Martin-des-Champs in Paris, and Saint Pancras Priory, Lewes, in England.

The various monasteries, spread across a large part of Western Europe, were grouped into ten provinces: Cluny, France (Paris basin), Auvergne, Bourbonnais, Gascony, Poitou, Provence, Lombardy, Germany, England and Spain. At its height, the number of Cluniac monks is estimated to have been between 9,000 and 12,000.

Directly subject to the Holy See, Cluny was in the 11th century the effective instrument of the success of the peace institutions and of the Gregorian Reform. Several popes and papal legates came from Cluny (including Gregory VII). The Cluniac network spread the principles of the reform against simony and Nicolaism, and intervened in the Investiture Controversy.

=== Cluniac ideology ===
The "Cluniac ideology" appeared around the year one thousand. It took shape under the abbacy of Odilo and asserted itself under the abbacies of Hugh of Semur and Peter the Venerable, the latter rejecting the new monasticism. This ideology was characterised by a conception of monasticism resting on: prayer, reading, meditation on the sacred texts, liturgical chant, contrition and an asceticism that must not, however, impair the divine office — all accompanied by attachment to the pope.

Odo put sacred history into verse and developed a practical morality. Odilo's sermons long remained models of elegant and concise eloquence. Abbo of Fleury defined the balances of political power. Peter the Venerable called on Christians to gain knowledge of the Quran in order to combat it more effectively, and to make more frequent use of translations from Arabic. Cluny produced theologians, moralists, poets and historians.

Cluny recruited its monks essentially from the nobility, and as a result the rigours of monastic life gradually softened.

Accused in its turn of excessive enrichment and excessive temporal power, the Order of Cluny lost its spiritual influence with the emergence, at the end of the 11th and beginning of the 12th century, of new orders inspired by an ideal of poverty and austerity: Cîteaux, the Premonstratensians, the Carthusians…

It was thus in complete opposition to the Cistercian ideal — over which Bernard of Clairvaux disputed bitterly with Peter the Venerable — that Cluny became one of the principal centres of intellectual and artistic life in the West.

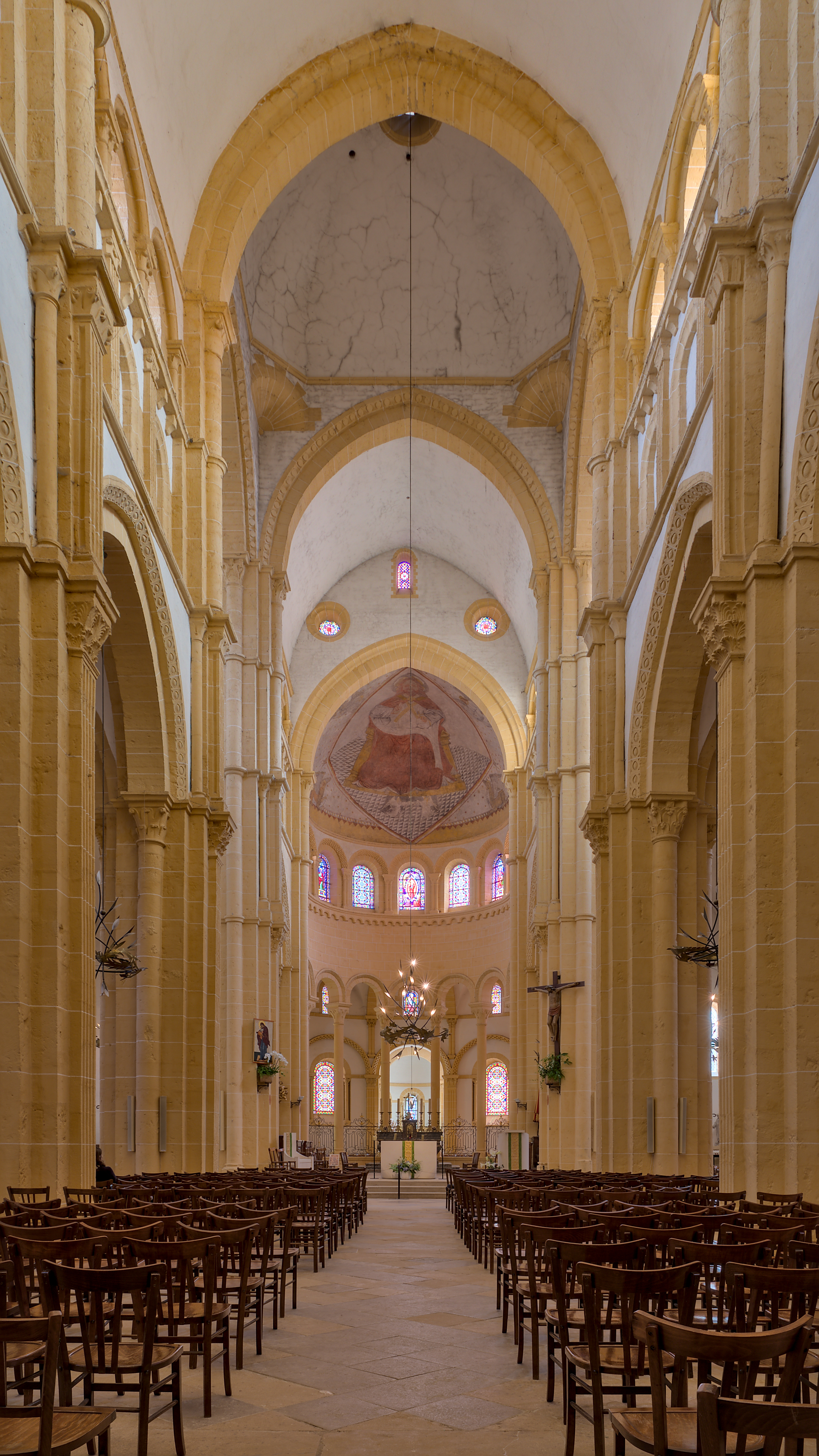
The Basilica of Paray-le-Monial, a smaller copy of Cluny III

=== Cluny's influence on Western art ===
Architecture was another affirmation of Cluny's power and influence. A church contemporary with the foundation was succeeded by Berno's abbey church, then by that of abbots Aymard and Majolus, known as Saint-Pierre-le-Vieux, whose characteristic plan, with its choir flanked by aisles, was more or less reproduced in a whole group of monastic churches. This was followed by the abbey church of Abbot Hugh, whose choir was consecrated in 1095. Cluny served as a model. The plan of Saint-Pierre-le-Vieux was found again in Burgundy, Germany and Switzerland.

The sculpted decoration of the abbey church was an innovation that spread to other monasteries. The portals decorated with sculptures and the historiated capitals were imitated in many churches. Its use of pointed arches and Roman-style fluted pilasters with Corinthian capitals was also influential, especially in Burgundy.

== Decline (second half of the 12th century – 18th century) ==
=== Competition from new religious orders ===
In the 12th century, Cluny's influence was challenged by the foundation of new orders — the Cistercians under the impulse of Bernard of Clairvaux, the Premonstratensians with Norbert of Xanten, among others. From the second half of the 12th century, despite several attempts, the Order of Cluny proved incapable of thorough reform and turned in on itself, which led it to stagnation. Moreover, the eminent role played by Cluny in the quarrel between priesthood and empire was diminished by the weakening of imperial authority and the assertion of the power of the kings of France. The papacy succeeded in imposing its authority by relying on the secular clergy more than on the regular clergy. It henceforth appointed the abbots of Cluny and the priors directly.

In the 13th century came the appearance of the mendicant orders of friars, which, together with urban growth, undermined Cluniac power, resting as it did on landed property and the support of the nobility. If Cluny's prestige remained intact, its dynamism withered. During the Hundred Years' War, the cells of French abbeys in England were viewed with suspicion, and Cluniac houses became increasingly separate from Cluny itself, becoming naturalised to avoid dissolution as 'alien houses'. This political division was exacerbated by the Papal Schism of the late 14th century, in which England and France supported rival claimants to the papacy. Similarly, both Scottish houses (Paisley and Crossraguel) were raised to abbey status, effectively becoming independent from Cluny.

=== The early modern period: attempts at reform ===
Faced with the laxity and abuses affecting a large part of the Cluniacs from the 15th century onwards, Abbot Jean de Bourbon attempted from 1458 a great enterprise of restoring monastic discipline throughout the order, and decreed various measures, which met with mixed success.

While these measures brought about the disappearance of abuses in certain monastic establishments — including Cluny itself, which during his tenure once again became a flourishing abbey — the same was not true of others, which vigorously opposed the decreed measures. To this end, some Cluniacs went so far as to appeal to the civil courts or even to the Pope to have them annulled or to remove themselves from the jurisdiction of the abbot of Cluny. Jean de Bourbon's efforts at restoration were finally reduced to nothing by the outbreak of the Burgundian Wars. Cluny Abbey was ravaged by the forces of Charles the Bold, causing a disorganisation that weakened Cluny, and thereby all its daughters.

The decline continued in the 16th century. The system of commendam, the Protestant Reformation and the French Wars of Religion were the principal causes. The commendatory abbots, all drawn from the great noble families of the kingdom, most often contented themselves with collecting the revenues attached to their appointment. The Reformation brought about the dissolution of the monasteries in England in the 1530s and the closure of a number in Germany. Both Scottish houses were also dissolved in the late 16th century. In France, the Wars of Religion caused destruction at Cluny itself and in other priories. This weakening of the order was intensified by the conduct of the monks, who no longer respected the rule and behaved more and more like the secular clergy.

Nevertheless, after the Council of Trent, the abbot of Cluny, Claude de Lorraine, convened the general chapter in 1600 with the aim of reforming the order from within. The failure of this attempt and of those that followed led to the search for reform from without. Richelieu, Mazarin and their successors likewise failed to reform this sclerotic order: the attempted unions with the Congregation of Saint-Vanne and Saint-Hydulphe, founded in 1604, and the Congregation of Saint Maur, founded in 1621 — both congregations engaged in a reform of the Benedictine monasteries — provoked multiple oppositions that led certain priories to leave the order, which split between priories following the ancient observance (unreformed) and priories following the strict observance (reformed). Cluny, considerably weakened, remained independent but was slowly dying.

== Disappearance of the order ==
In 1768, the royal government created a Commission of Regulars charged with assessing the situation of the monasteries of all the orders with a view to consolidation. For the Order of Cluny, there were 296 religious following the ancient observance and 375 the strict observance. A decree of the Council of 27 March 1788 forbade the monasteries following the ancient observance from recruiting novices; the 214 remaining religious were distributed among other establishments. Only the priories and abbeys following the strict observance remained in the Order of Cluny.

The abolition of religious vows and the suppression of the regular clergy by the National Constituent Assembly in February 1790 brought about the dispersal of the monks and the disappearance of the Order — a disappearance marked by the sale of the abbey church of Cluny, which had become a bien national, followed by its destruction at the beginning of the 19th century.

== European Federation of Cluniac Sites ==
On 18 June 1994, as part of the celebrations of the millennium of the death of Abbot Majolus, 24 communes of France and Switzerland founded at Souvigny (Allier, France) the Federation of Cluniac Sites, an association intended to promote the Cluniac heritage. (Note: Wishing to develop the Cluniac brand, the association registered the federation's name, its activities and the rosette of the Cluniac Sites with the Institut national de la propriété industrielle as early as the end of 1994.) Across Europe and the Middle East, more than 2,047 places that at some point in their history maintained an administrative or cultural link with the Cluniac monastic order have been identified; the Federation of Cluniac Sites has set itself the goal of restoring cultural meaning to this dense and complex common heritage.

In 2005, the Council of Europe recognised the network of Cluniac Sites as a "Major Cultural Route" for its pan-European dimension and the major role played by Cluny in the formation of European identity. This certification as a Cultural Route has been renewed without interruption (most recently in 2023).

For the 1,100th anniversary of the foundation of Cluny Abbey, the association became in May 2010 the European Federation of Cluniac Sites.

In 2023, the Federation brought together 202 sites from 8 European countries: Germany, Spain, France, Italy, Poland, Portugal, the United Kingdom and Switzerland. Within it, they carry out projects in the fields of heritage, culture, tourism, events, research and education.

Since 2017, the European Federation of Cluniac Sites has promoted and coordinated the candidacy for inscription on the UNESCO World Heritage List of the property "Cluny and the European Cluniac Sites".

In 2024, the Federation envisaged the inscription on the World Heritage List of 38 sites, spread across 8 European countries:

- France:
  - Bourgogne-Franche-Comté: Cluny, Semur-en-Brionnais, Cruzille, Cormatin, Blanot, Baume-les-Messieurs, Berzé-la-Ville, Bonnay, Saint-Gengoux, Paray-le-Monial, La Charité-sur-Loire, Nevers, Autun, Bray
  - Auvergne-Rhône-Alpes: Mozac, Souvigny, Charlieu, Pommiers-en-Forez
  - Centre-Val de Loire: Déols
  - Nouvelle-Aquitaine: Moirax
  - Occitanie: Carennac, Moissac
  - Pays de la Loire: Maillezais
- Germany: Hirsau
- Spain: Carrión de los Condes, Sahagún, Frómista
- Italy: Vizzolo Predabissi, Provaglio d'Iseo, Capo di Ponte, Carpignano Sesia
- Poland: Tyniec Abbey
- Portugal: Monastery of Rates
- United Kingdom: Lewes, Castle Acre, Much Wenlock
- Switzerland: Romainmôtier, Payerne

== List of Cluniac sites in Europe ==
This list is not exhaustive. (Note: See also the general map for Europe on the website sitesclunisiens.org.)

=== In France ===
- Abbeville (Somme), priory of Saint-Pierre-et-Saint-Paul
- Airaines (Somme), priory of Airaines
- Albert (Somme), priory of Saint-Gervais-et-Saint-Protais (destroyed)
- Ambierle (Loire), priory of Saint-Martin
- Amiens (Somme), priory of Saint-Denis (destroyed)
- Auxerre (Yonne), abbey of Saint-Germain
- Baume-les-Messieurs (Jura), abbey of Saint-Pierre
- Baugy (Saône-et-Loire), church of Saint-Ponce
- Béard (Nièvre), priory
- Beaulieu-sur-Dordogne (Corrèze), abbey of Saint-Pierre
- Berzé-la-Ville (Saône-et-Loire), priory
- Bournoncle-Saint-Pierre (Haute-Loire), priory of Saint-Pierre
- Boves (Somme), priory of Saint-Ausbert (destroyed)
- Brétigny (Oise), priory of Saint-Pierre-et-Saint-Nicolas
- Cappy (Somme), priory (destroyed)
- Carennac (Lot), priory of Saint-Pierre-et-Saint-Saturnin
- La Charité-sur-Loire (Nièvre), priory of Notre-Dame
- Charlieu (Loire), priory of Saint-Fortunat
- Charolles (Saône-et-Loire), priory of Sainte-Marie-Madeleine
- Châtel-Montagne (Allier), priory of Notre-Dame
- Cluny (Saône-et-Loire), Cluny Abbey
- Courteuil (Oise), priory of Saint-Nicolas-d'Acy
- Crépy-en-Valois (Oise), priory of Saint-Arnoul
- Davenescourt (Somme), priory of Notre-Dame (destroyed)
- Déols (Indre), abbey of Notre-Dame
- Dole (Jura), college of Saint-Jérôme
- Domène (Isère), priory of Saint-Pierre-et-Saint-Paul (listed ruin)
- Dompierre-sur-Authie (Somme), priory (destroyed)
- Doullens (Somme), priory of Saint-Michel (destroyed)
- Figeac (Lot), abbey of Saint-Sauveur
- Fleurines (Oise), priory of Saint-Christophe-en-Halatte
- Froville (Meurthe-et-Moselle), priory of Froville
- Gaye (Marne), priory of Notre-Dame de Gaye
- Ganagobie (Alpes-de-Haute-Provence), abbey of Notre-Dame
- Gigny (Jura), abbey of Saint-Pierre
- Iguerande (Saône-et-Loire), church of Saint-Marcel
- Lamontgie (Puy-de-Dôme), priory of Notre-Dame
- Lavoûte-Chilhac (Haute-Loire), priory of Sainte-Croix
- L'Échelle-Saint-Aurin (Somme), priory
- Le Pouzin (Ardèche), priory of Saint-Pierre
- Ligny-sur-Canche (Pas-de-Calais), priory
- Lihons (Somme), priory of Lihons-en-Santerre (destroyed)
- Limoges (Haute-Vienne), Abbey of Saint Martial, Limoges
- Marcigny (Saône-et-Loire), priory of La Trinité
- Marestmontiers (Somme), priory of Saint-Pierre-et-Saint-Paul (destroyed)
- Marsat (Puy-de-Dôme), priory of Notre-Dame
- Massay (Cher), abbey of Saint-Martin
- Mazille (Saône-et-Loire), deanery of Cluny Abbey
- Menat (Puy-de-Dôme), abbey of Saint-Sauveur
- Moirax (Lot-et-Garonne), priory of Notre-Dame
- Moissac (Tarn-et-Garonne), abbey of Saint-Pierre-et-Saint-Paul
- Montbrison-sur-Lez (Drôme), priory
- Montdidier (Somme), priory of Notre-Dame
- Mozac (Puy-de-Dôme), abbey of Saint-Pierre-et-Saint-Caprais
- Nantua (Ain), priory of Saint-Pierre
- Nevers (Nièvre), priory of Saint-Étienne, priory of Saint-Sauveur, priory of Saint-Cyprien
- Nogent-le-Rotrou (Eure-et-Loir), priory of Saint-Denis
- Paray-le-Monial (Saône-et-Loire), priory of Notre-Dame
- Paris, Collège de Cluny
- Paris, priory of Saint-Martin-des-Champs
- Poitiers (Vienne), abbey of Montierneuf
- Pommiers-en-Forez (Loire), priory of Saint-Pierre
- Pont-Saint-Esprit (Gard), priory of Saint-Saturnin
- Piolenc (Vaucluse), priory of Saint-Pierre
- Quierzy (Aisne), priory
- Ris (Puy-de-Dôme), priory of Notre-Dame
- Ronsenac (Charente), priory of Saint-Jean-Baptiste
- Ruffey-sur-Seille (Jura), priory of Saint-Christophe
- Saint-Germain-des-Fossés (Allier), priory of Saint-Germain
- Saint-Gilles (Gard), abbey of Saint-Gilles
- Saint-Leu-d'Esserent (Oise), priory of Saint-Nicolas
- Saint-Lothain (Jura), priory of Silèze
- Saint-Marcel-lès-Chalon (Saône-et-Loire), priory of Saint-Marcel
- Saint-Pierre-d'Allevard (Isère), church of Saint-Pierre
- Saint-Saulve (Nord), abbey of Saint-Saulve de Valenciennes
- Sarrians (Vaucluse), priory of Saint-Pierre
- Sauxillanges (Puy-de-Dôme), priory of Saint-Pierre-et-Saint-Paul
- Semur-en-Brionnais (Saône-et-Loire), Semur-en-Brionnais
- Souvigny (Allier), priory of Saint-Pierre-et-Saint-Paul
- Ternay (Rhône), priory of Saint-Pierre
- Thiers (Puy-de-Dôme), abbey of Le Moutier
- Valensole (Alpes-de-Haute-Provence), priory of Saint-Maxime-et-Saint-Blaise
- Vaux-sur-Poligny (Jura), priory of Vaux-sur-Poligny
- Vézelay (Yonne), abbey of Sainte-Marie-Madeleine
- Volvic (Puy-de-Dôme), priory of Saint-Priest

=== In Spain ===
- Monastery of San Pedro de Cardeña, priory of Saint Peter
- Carrión de los Condes, priory of San Zoilo
- Sahagún, abbey of Santos Facundo y Primitivo
- Monastery of San Juan de la Peña

=== In Switzerland ===
- Bassins, priory of Notre-Dame
- Baulmes, parish church of Saint-Pierre
- Bevaix, priory
- Payerne, priory of Sainte-Marie
- Romainmôtier, priory of Saint-Pierre-et-Saint-Paul
- Rougemont, priory
- Rüeggisberg, priory

=== In Italy ===
- Pontida, priory of Saint James
- San Benedetto Po, abbey of Saint Benedict
- Vertemate con Minoprio, priory of Saint John the Baptist

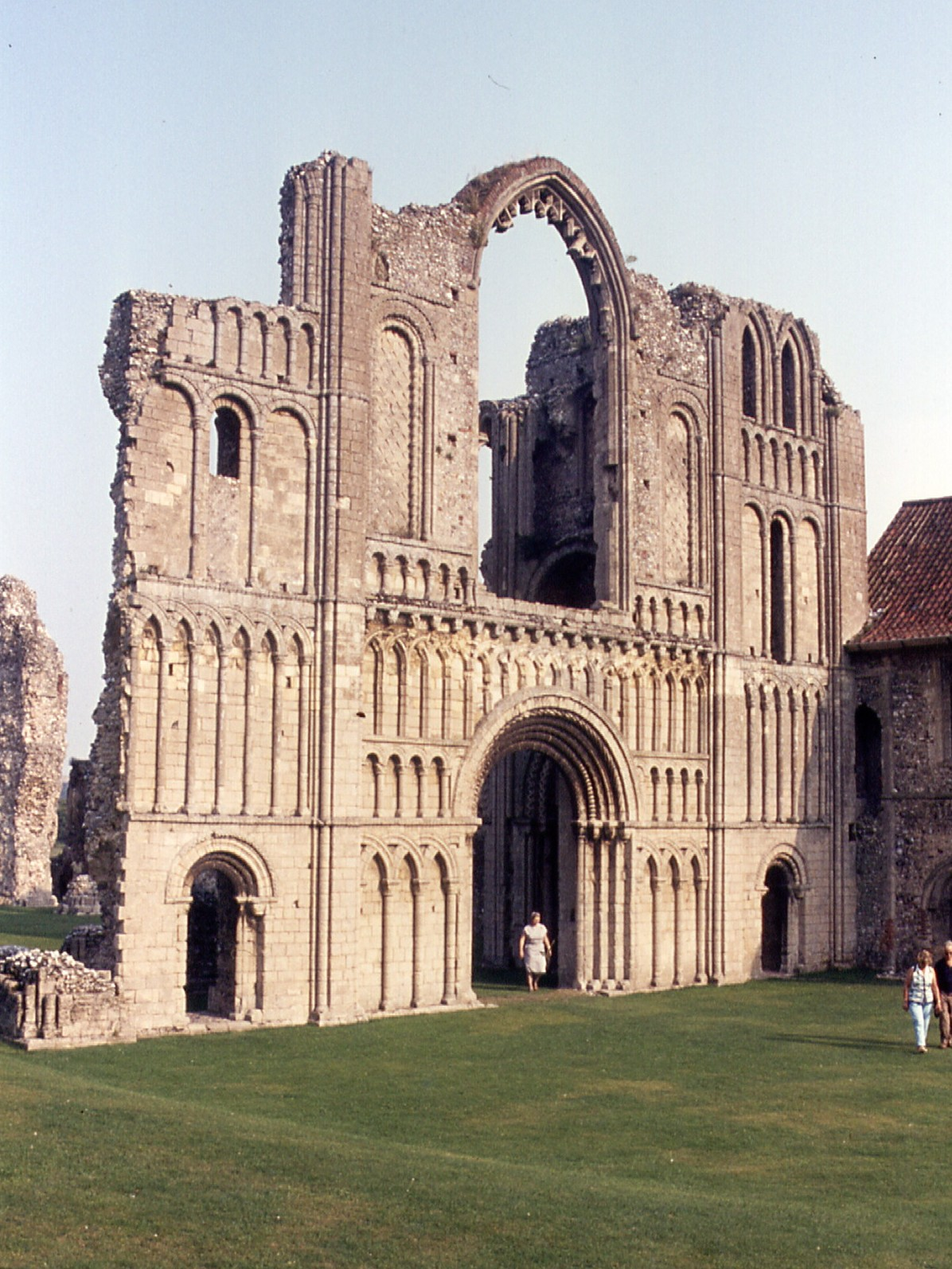
The ornate west front of Castle Acre Priory

=== In Great Britain ===
- Arthington Priory (nuns)
- Barnstaple Priory
- Bermondsey Abbey
- Bromholm Priory
- Castle Acre Priory
- Crossraguel Abbey
- Daventry Priory
- Delapré Abbey (nuns)
- Dudley Priory
- Faversham Abbey
- Lenton Priory
- Lewes Priory
- Monk Bretton Priory (until 1281)
- Montacute Priory
- Paisley Abbey
- Pontefract Priory
- Prittlewell Priory
- Thetford Priory
- Wenlock Priory

=== In Germany ===
- Alpirsbach, abbey
- Calw, Hirsau Abbey
- Sankt Ulrich im Schwarzwald, abbey

== See also ==
- Abbot of Cluny
- Order of Saint Benedict
- Ottonian Renaissance
- Abbey of Saint-Géraud d'Aurillac
- Burgundian Romanesque art

== Sources ==
- Henderson, Ernest F., ed. (1892). "The Foundation Charter of the Order of Cluny". Select Historical Documents of the Middle Ages. London: George Bell and Sons. pp. 329–333 – via Wikisource.

== Bibliography ==
Historical studies on Cluny are numerous, though with a very marked predominance of work on the Middle Ages. Cluny is a symbol of the Gregorian Reform, and a rich and influential order of its time. Moreover, the period of restoration under Peter the Venerable can be observed in two writings of great historical interest, the dispositio rei familiaris and the constitutio expensae cluniaci, which provide a wealth of information on the medieval agricultural economy.

=== General works ===
- Collective, "Cluny ou la puissance des moines", Dossiers d'Archéologie, no. 260. (in French)
- Dom Pierre Anger, Le Collège de Cluny, fondé à Paris dans le voisinage de la Sorbonne et dans le ressort de l'Université, Paris, 1916. (in French)
- Dom Jean-Martial Besse (May 1905). "L'Ordre de Cluny et son gouvernement. I. L'abbé de Cluny, supérieur général". Revue Mabillon (in French). 1 (1): 5–40.; II. Les chapitres généraux, August 1905, no. 2, pp. 97–138; III. Visites des monastères, November 1905, no. 3, pp. 177–194; IV. Officiers généraux et taxes, May 1906, vol. 2, no. 1, pp. 1–22.
- Alexandre Bruel, Recueil des chartes de l'abbaye de Cluny, Paris, 1876. (in French)
- Dom Gaston Charvin (ed.), Statuts, chapitres généraux et visites de l'ordre de Cluny, Paris, 1965–1982, 10 vols. (in French)
- Heitz, Carol (1984). "Cluny". Encyclopædia Universalis (in French). Paris.
- Dom Jacques Hourlier, "Cluny et la notion d'ordre religieux", in À Cluny. Congrès scientifique, fêtes et cérémonies liturgiques en l'honneur des saints abbés Odon et Odilon, proceedings of the congress "Art, histoire, liturgie" (9–11 July 1949), Dijon, 1950, pp. 219–226. (in French)
- Marcel Pacaut, L'Ordre de Cluny (909–1789), Paris, Fayard, 1986 ISBN 978-2-213-01712-9; 2nd ed. 1994. (in French)

=== Middle Ages ===
- Cochelin, Isabelle (1998). "Peut-on parler de noviciat à Cluny pour les X^{e}–XI^{e} siècles ?". Revue Mabillon (in French). LXX: 17–52. doi:10.1484/J.RM.2.305598.
- Cochelin, Isabelle (2000). "Étude sur les hiérarchies monastiques: le prestige de l'ancienneté et son éclipse à Cluny au XI^{e} siècle". Revue Mabillon (in French). LXXII: 5–37. doi:10.1484/J.RM.2.305639.
- Duby, Georges (1952). "Économie domaniale et économie monétaire: le budget de l'abbaye de Cluny entre 1080 et 1155". Annales. Économies, Sociétés, Civilisations (in French). 7 (2): 155–171. doi:10.3406/ahess.1952.2049.
- Duby, Georges (1993). "Seigneurs et paysans". Hommes et structures du Moyen Âge (in French). Vol. II. Éditions Flammarion. ISBN 978-2-08-081182-0.
- Henriet, Patrick (2000). "Moines envahisseurs ou moines civilisateurs ? Cluny dans l'historiographie espagnole (XIII^{e}–XX^{e} siècles)". Revue Mabillon (in French). LXXII: 135–159. doi:10.1484/J.RM.2.305645.
- Iogna-Prat, Dominique (2000). "Cluny, 909–910 ou l'instrumentalisation de la mémoire des origines". Revue Mabillon (in French). LXXII: 161–185. doi:10.1484/J.RM.2.305646.
- Méhu, Didier (2001). Paix et communauté autour de l'abbaye de Cluny (X^{e}–XV^{e} siècle) (in French). Lyon.
- Racinet, Philippe (1997). Crises et renouveaux: les monastères clunisiens à la fin du Moyen Âge (XIII^{e}–XVI^{e} siècle), de la Flandre au Berry et comparaisons méridionales (in French). Arras.
- Riche, Denyse (2000). L'ordre de Cluny à la fin du Moyen Âge: le vieux pays clunisien, XII^{e}–XV^{e} siècles (in French). Saint-Étienne: Presses de l'université de Saint-Étienne (C.E.R.C.O.R. Travaux et recherches). ISBN 978-2-86272-192-7.
- de Valoüs, Guy (1970). Le Monachisme clunisien des origines au XV^{e} siècle : vie intérieure des monastères et organisation de l'ordre (in French) (2nd, expanded ed.). Paris.
- Vingtain, Dominique (1998). L'Abbaye de Cluny, Centre de l'Occident médiéval (in French).

=== Early modern period ===
- Dom Gaston Charvin: (in French)
  - "L'abbaye et l'Ordre de Cluny en France de la mort de Richelieu à l'élection de Mazarin (1642–1654)", Revue Mabillon, vol. 33, 1943, pp. 85–124;
  - "L'abbaye et l'Ordre de Cluny sous l'abbatiat de Mazarin (1654–1661)", Revue Mabillon, vol. 34, 1944, pp. 20–81;
  - "La succession de Mazarin à l'abbaye de Cluny. Le cardinal Renaud d'Este (1661–1672)", Revue Mabillon, vol. 37, 1947, pp. 17–46;
  - "Dom Henri-Bertrand de Beuvron, abbé de Cluny (1672–1682)", Revue Mabillon, vol. 37, 1947, pp. 69–97;
  - "Emmanuel-Théodose de La Tour d'Auvergne, cardinal de Bouillon, abbé de Cluny (1683–1715), et le conflit de la juridiction abbatiale", Revue Mabillon, vol. 38, 1948, pp. 7–57;
  - "Henry-Oswald de la Tour d'Auvergne, abbé de Cluny (1715–1747)", Revue Mabillon, vol. 38, 1948, pp. 61–99;
  - "Frédéric-Jérôme de La Rochefoucauld, abbé de Cluny (1747–1757)", Revue Mabillon, vol. 39, 1949, pp. 25–35;
  - "L'abbaye et l'Ordre de Cluny à la fin du XVIII^{e} siècle (1757–1790)", Revue Mabillon, vol. 39, 1949, pp. 44–58; vol. 40, 1950, pp. 1–28;
  - "La fin de l'Ordre de Cluny (1789–1790)", Revue Mabillon, vol. 40, 1950, pp. 29–41;
  - "L'abbaye et l'Ordre de Cluny de la fin du XV^{e} au début du XVII^{e} siècle (1485–1630)", Revue Mabillon, vol. 43, 1953, pp. 85–117 (online); vol. 44, 1954, pp. 6–29 (online) and 105–132 (online).
- Denis, Dom Paul (1910). "Un procureur général de Cluny, agent secret à Rome de Philippe d'Orléans (1717–1718)". Revue Mabillon (in French). 6: 381–436.
- Pierre Gasnault, "La publication du dernier bréviaire de l'Ordre de Cluny (1778–1779)", Revue Mabillon, n.s., vol. 11 (= vol. 72), 2000, pp. 129–134. (in French)
- Goudot, Grégory (2004). "Le personnel clunisien en France à la veille de la Révolution. Sources, méthode et premiers résultats d'une enquête". Siècles (in French). 19 (19): 25–40. doi:10.4000/siecles.2445.
- Goudot, Grégory (2006). "Monachisme clunisien et vie rurale sous l'Ancien Régime. Le cas auvergnat de Menat aux XVII^{e}–XVIII^{e} siècles". Histoire et sociétés rurales (in French). 25 (25): 9–35. doi:10.3917/hsr.025.09.
- Goudot, Grégory (2007). "Pour une histoire de l'Ecclesia cluniacensis à l'époque moderne". Cahiers clunisiens (in French) (1): 28–31.
- Daniel-Odon Hurel, "La représentation de Cluny chez les auteurs des XVII^{e} et XVIII^{e} siècles", Revue Mabillon, n.s., vol. 11 (= vol. 72), 2000, pp. 115–128. (in French)
- Hurel, Daniel-Odon (2001–2002). "Cluny entre Réforme catholique et siècle des Lumières". Dossiers d'archéologie (in French) (269/270): 24–27.
