= Cluny Abbey =

Abbey in Saône-et-Loire, France

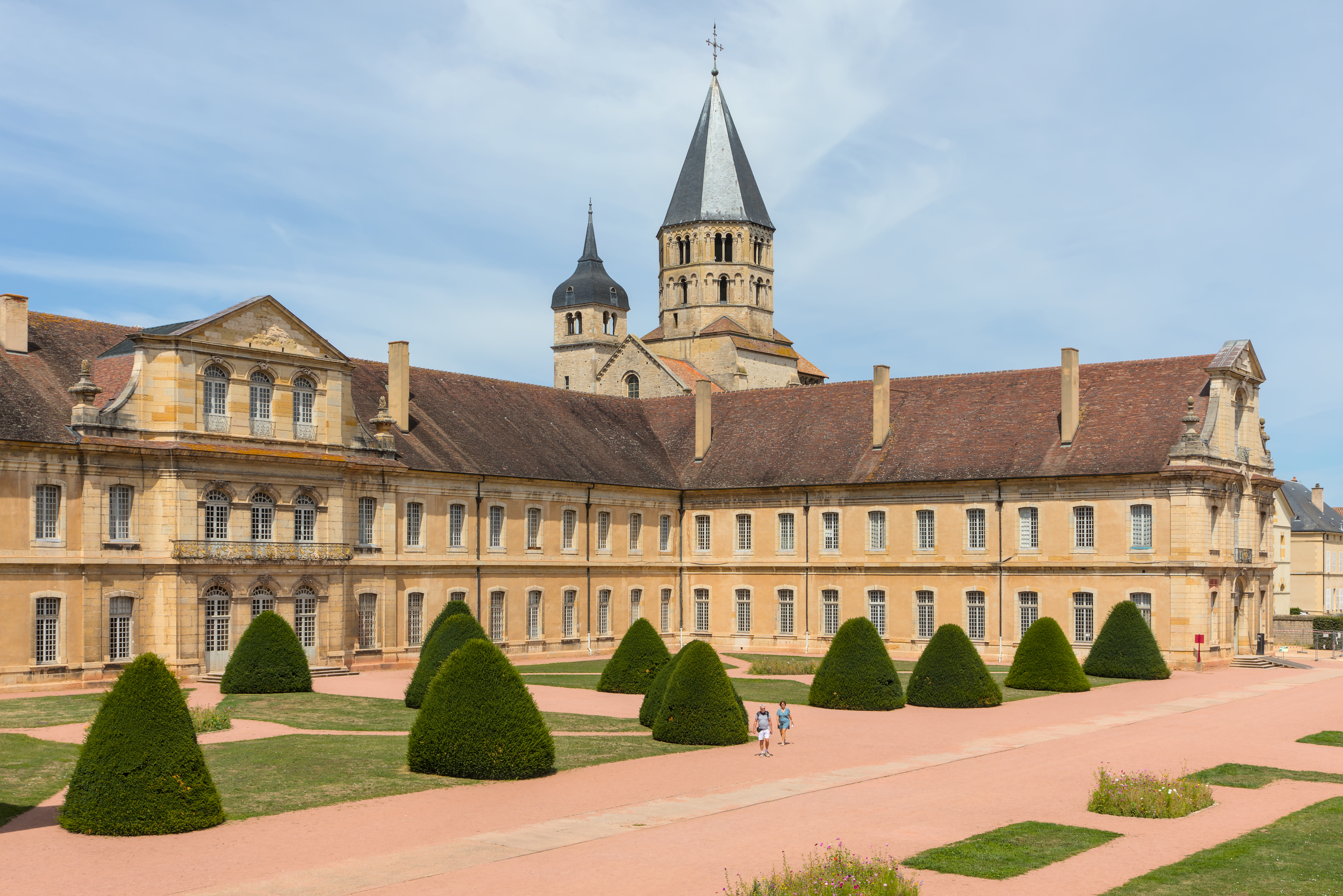
- Cluny Abbey in 2025.

- Location within France

Monastery information
- Order: Benedictine
- Established: 910
- Disestablished: 1790
- Dedication: Saint Peter and Saint Paul
- Diocese: Autun

People
- Founder: William I, Duke of Aquitaine

Site
- Location: Cluny, Saône-et-Loire, France
- Coordinates: 46°26′03″N 4°39′33″E
- Website: cluny-abbaye.fr

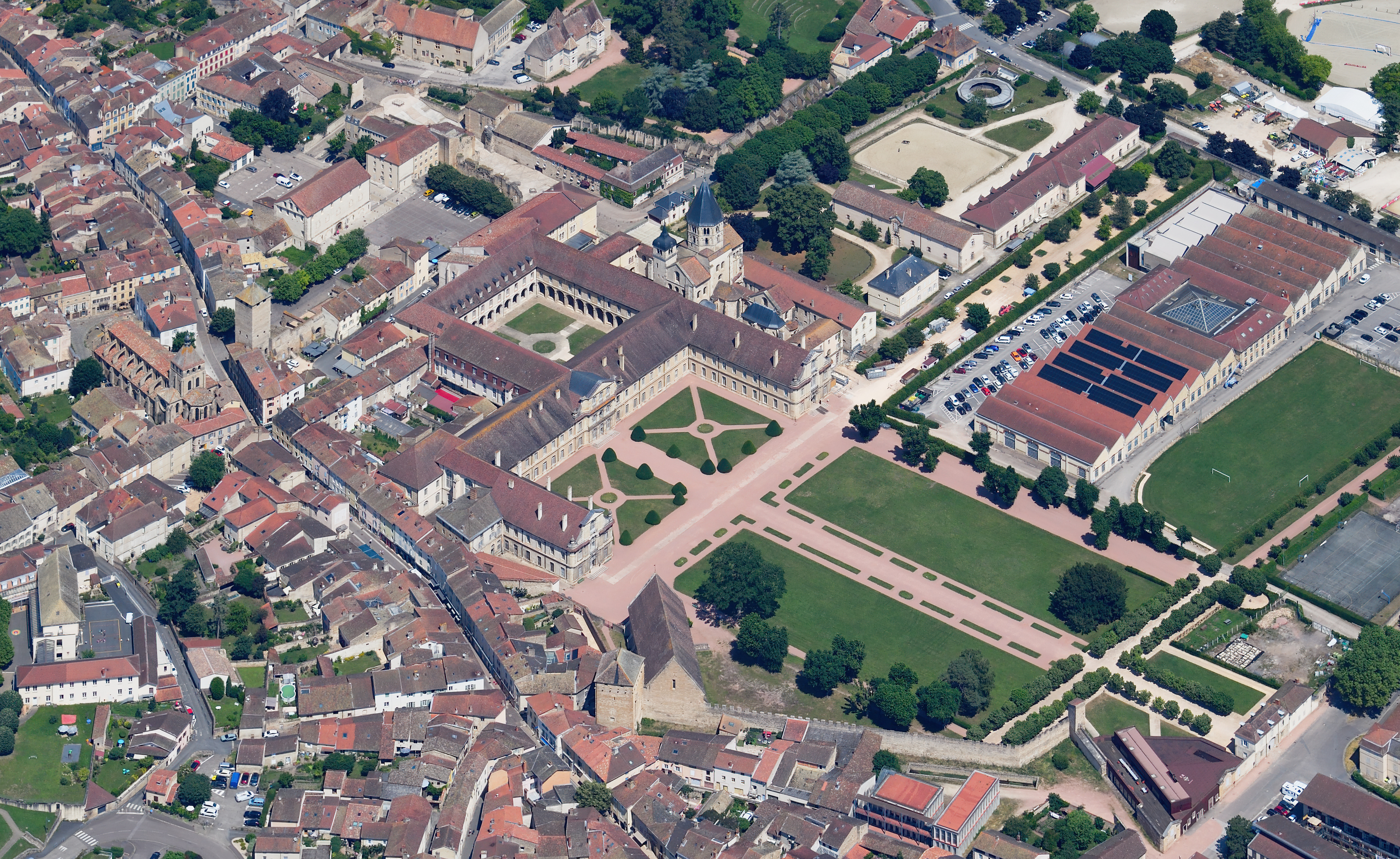
Aerial image of Cluny Abbey with its court of honor

Cluny Abbey (French: [klyni]; French: Abbaye de Cluny, formerly also Cluni or Clugny; Latin: Abbatia Cluniacensis) is a former Benedictine monastery in Cluny, Saône-et-Loire, France. It was dedicated to Saints Peter and Paul. The abbey was the originating point of Cluniac Reforms and controlled a large network of monasteries throughout the Western Europe, sometimes referred to as the Cluniac Order.

The abbey was constructed in the Romanesque architectural style, with three churches built in succession from the 10th to the early 12th centuries. The last basilica was the world's largest church until the construction of St. Peter's Basilica in Rome.

Cluny was founded by Duke William I of Aquitaine in 910. He nominated Berno as the first abbot of Cluny, subject only to Pope Sergius III. The abbey was notable for its stricter adherence to the Rule of St. Benedict, whereby Cluny became acknowledged as the leader of western monasticism. In 1790 during the French Revolution, the abbey was sacked and mostly destroyed, with only a small part surviving.

Starting around 1334, the Abbots of Cluny maintained a townhouse in Paris known as the Hôtel de Cluny, which has been a public museum since 1843. Apart from the name, and the building itself, it no longer possesses anything originally connected with Cluny.

Coat of Arms of Cluny Abbey: "Gules two keys in saltire the wards upwards and outwards or overall a sword in pale argent".

== History ==
=== Foundation ===
In 910, William I, Duke of Aquitaine "the Pious", and Count of Auvergne, founded the Benedictine Abbey of Cluny on a modest scale, as the motherhouse of the Congregation of Cluny. William chose as the first abbot Berno, abbot of Baume and of Gigny in the Jura, a member of the family of the counts of Burgundy and an important figure in the movement to reform Benedictine monasticism. The deed of gift included vineyards, fields, meadows, woods, waters, mills, serfs, and lands both cultivated and uncultivated. Hospitality was to be given to the poor, strangers, and pilgrims. It was stipulated that the monastery would be free from local authorities, lay or ecclesiastical, and subject only to the Pope, with the proviso that even he could not seize the property, divide or give it to someone else or appoint an abbot without the consent of the monks. William placed Cluny under the protection of Saints Peter and Paul, with a curse on anyone who should violate the charter. With the Pope across the Alps in Italy, this meant the monastery was essentially independent.

In donating his hunting preserve in the forests of Burgundy, William released Cluny Abbey from all future obligations to him and his family other than prayer. Contemporary patrons normally retained a proprietary interest and expected to install their kinsmen as abbots. William appears to have made this arrangement with Berno, the first abbot, to free the new monastery from such secular entanglements and initiate the Cluniac Reforms. The deeds made all assets of the Abbey sacred, so that to take them was to commit sacrilege.

=== Early years and expansion ===
In 926, a few months before his death, Berno designated Odo to succeed him. He was a travelling companion of Berno, close to his predecessor's conceptions. He travelled from monastery to monastery to consolidate the Reform. In 931 he obtained the right to reform other abbeys, granted by Pope John XI. Some monasteries renounced the election of their own abbot and adopted the Cluniac model, but this was still rare. Cluny's influence grew, but there was as yet no organisation properly speaking. The monastery obtained the right to mint coinage, and schools were opened, as well as the library. By the time of Odo's death in 942, Cluny's influence had spread considerably. The abbey depended on the patronage of the high aristocracy, the emperor, the king of Burgundy, the counts and the bishops.

Aymard succeeded Odo and continued his work, but he went blind in 948 and consequently appointed a coadjutor, Majolus, who ultimately directed Cluny from 954 until 994. Majolus organised the reform with great piety and grandeur. Born into a great and wealthy family of lords of Valensole, he drew on his considerable experience of administration. In 973 he was kidnapped by Arab Muslims from Fraxinet, who demanded a large ransom for his release. Majolus was nicknamed "the arbiter of kings" for his relations with the aristocracy. His prestige was great, and he refused the papal office in 973. He was notably a friend of the future king of France Hugh Capet and had very strong ties with the Holy Roman Empire, which enabled Cluny's expansion eastward. His funeral was paid for by Hugh Capet; he was beatified shortly afterwards, then canonised. The Order of Cluny then comprised some thirty highly dynamic establishments, under the authority of the central abbey at Cluny.

=== The abbey at its height ===
The abbots of Cluny became international leaders, and the monastery of Cluny was considered the grandest, most prestigious, and best-endowed monastic institution in Europe, at the head of a vast Order.

In 994, Odilo of Mercœur became abbot of Cluny and directed it for 55 years. Son of the lords of Mercœur, he was in contact with the most illustrious figures of his time. In 998 he obtained from Pope Gregory V independence from the bishopric of Mâcon, a right extended to all Cluniac abbeys in 1024 by Pope John XIX. These papal concessions gave birth to the ecclesia cluniacensis (Cluniac church). Odilo seized the opportunities presented to the order in an era troubled by the collapse of Carolingian structures and the birth of feudal society. He no longer counted on the protection of the high aristocracy and came to terms with the lesser lords. He sought to calm the violence of the age, supporting the Peace and Truce of God. At Odilo's death, there were 70 houses in the Order, and Cluny had associated itself with powerful abbeys, which sometimes retained considerable autonomy.

In 1049, Hugh of Semur became abbot. He was a Burgundian, from Semur-en-Brionnais. He possessed great eloquence and political sense He completed Cluny's integration into the feudal system. The hierarchical principle of the Order was partly relaxed around 1075, so as to allow powerful and proud Benedictine abbeys, such as Vézelay, to join. The order extended into Spain, Italy and England, numbering 10,000 monks. In 1089, Hugh of Semur undertook the construction of a great new church, Cluny III.

In 1109, after the abbacy of Hugh II, which lasted only a few weeks, Pons of Melgueil was elected abbot (1109–1122). He was a southerner, a skilled negotiator, but intransigent. He played a very active role in the ending of the Investiture Controversy and continued the order's policy of grandeur, including the construction of Cluny III, a gigantic abbey church that swallowed up all donations, including a substantial one from Castile. Charity given to the poor also increased the abbey's expenditure. This caused the abbey's first serious financial problems, leading to opposition to Pons. The abbey's supremacy within the reform movement was also challenged by the foundation of the more austere Citeaux Abbey in 1098, leading to the creation of the Cistercian Order. Pons resigned after a meeting with Pope Callixtus II.

Peter of Montboissier, better known as Peter the Venerable, replaced him in 1122. He was a cultivated and very skilful man. He had to face the unexpected return of Pons in 1126, after a pilgrimage to the Holy Land. Pons retook power at Cluny by using his influence and armed force. He was finally excommunicated, and Peter regained control of the monastery. He restored peace and re-established discipline after the laxity that had set in. The finances were in a lamentable state after the violence: mercenaries had been hired with gold from the Treasury. Peter attempted to impose sound estate management, with the help of Henry of Blois, bishop of Winchester. Peter died in 1151, and was succeeded by Hugh III of Frazans, deposed in 1161.

=== Later medieval decline ===
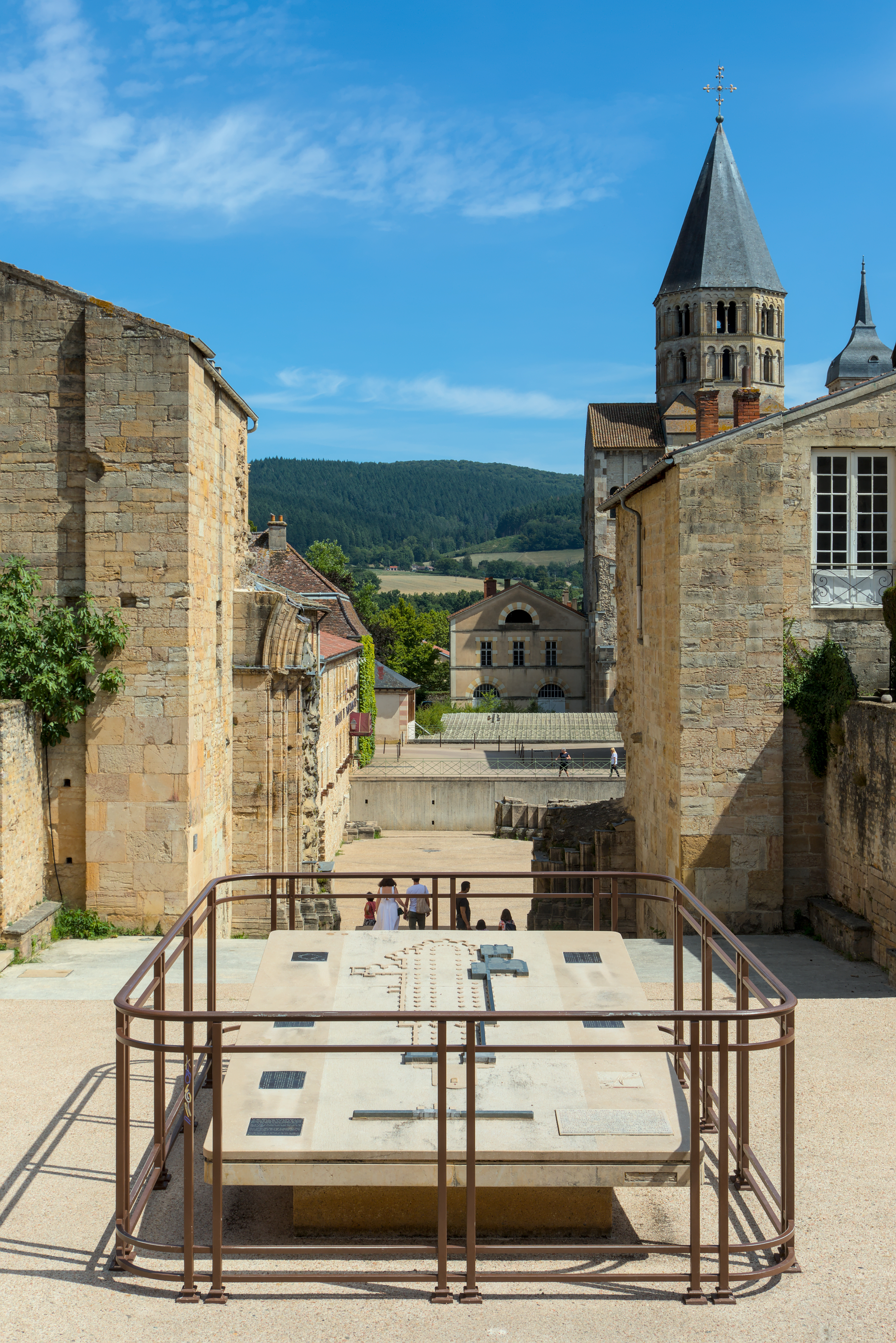
The site of the abbey church, looking east through the west door

As other religious orders such as the Cistercians in the 12th and then the Mendicants in the 13th century arose within the Western Christian church, the competition gradually weakened the status and influence of the abbey. Furthermore, poor management of the abbey's estates and the unwillingness of its subsidiary priories to pay their share of the annual taxable quotas annually reduced Cluny's total revenues. In response to these issues, Cluny raised loans against its assets but this saddled the abbey with debt. Throughout the late Middle Ages, conflicts with its subordinate priories increased.

Faced with the laxity and abuses affecting the Order, Abbot Jean de Bourbon attempted from 1458 a great enterprise of restoring monastic discipline throughout the order, and decreed various measures, which met with mixed success. Cluny itself was revitalised, but other houses in the Order opposed the reforms, some even seceding entirely. Cluny Abbey was ravaged by the forces of Charles the Bold in the Burgundian Wars, further weakening it.

Although the monks – who never numbered more than 60 – lived in relative luxury during the late middle ages, the political and religious wars of the 16th century further weakened the abbey's status. For instance with the Concordat of Bologna in 1516, overseen by Antoine Duprat, Francis I, the king of France, gained the power to appoint the abbot of Cluny. Over the next 250 years, the abbey never regained its power or position within European Christianity.

=== Suppression and destruction ===
By the time of the French Revolution, revolutionary hatred of the Catholic Church led to the suppression of the order in France in 1790. Seen as an example of the excesses of the Ancien Régime, the monastic buildings and most of the church were destroyed in the French Revolution. Its extensive library and archives were burned in 1793 and the church was given up to plundering. The abbey's estate was sold in 1798 for 2,140,000 francs. The monastery was mostly demolished in 1810. Until 1823 the Abbey's immense walls were quarried for stone that was used in rebuilding the town.

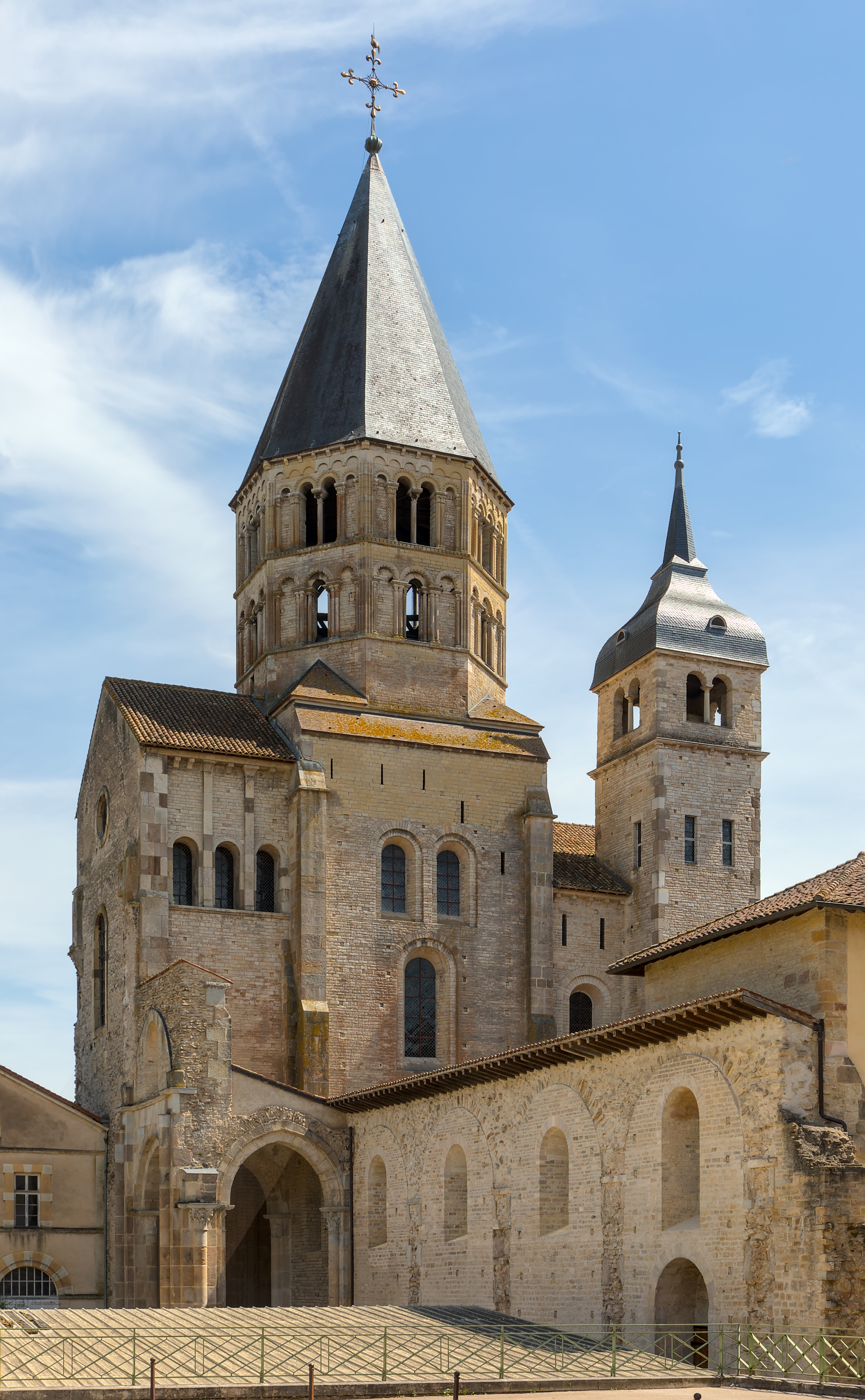
The surviving south transept of the abbey church

Although neglected for a generation after the revolution, in the 1830s the sentiments changed and efforts began to preserve the ruins. Extensive anniversary celebrations in 1898, 1910, and 1949 were "significant events in the history of French nationalism and Catholicism." In 1928, the site was excavated by the American archaeologist Kenneth J. Conant of Harvard University, with the backing of the Medieval Academy of America. Little remains of the original buildings, only about 10% of the original floor space of Cluny III. The remains include the southern transept and its bell-tower, and the lower parts of the two west front towers. Ruined bases of columns convey the size of the former church and monastery.

Since 1901 it has been a centre of the École nationale supérieure d'arts et métiers (ENSAM), an elite school of engineering.

== Cluny and the Gregorian reforms ==
The reforms introduced at Cluny were in some measure traceable to the influence of Benedict of Aniane, who had put forward his new ideas at the first great meeting of the abbots of the order held at Aachen (Aix-la-Chapelle) in 817. Berno had adopted Benedict's interpretation of the Rule previously at Baume Abbey.

Cluny was not known for the severity of its discipline or its asceticism, but the abbots of Cluny supported the revival of the papacy and the reforms of Pope Gregory VII with their liberty of the Church. The Cluniac establishment found itself closely identified with the Papacy. In the early 12th century, the order lost momentum under poor government. It was subsequently revitalised under Abbot Peter the Venerable (died 1156), who brought lax priories back into line and returned to stricter discipline. Cluny reached its apogee of power and influence under Peter, as its monks became bishops, legates, and cardinals throughout France and the Holy Roman Empire. However, by the time Peter died, newer and more austere orders such as the Cistercians were generating the next wave of ecclesiastical reform.

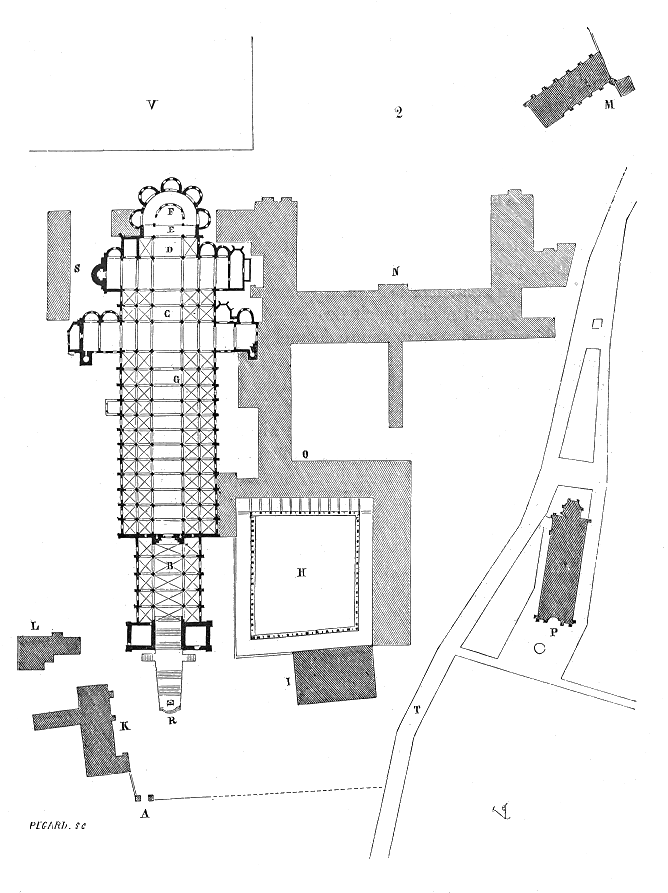
A plan of the Abbey.

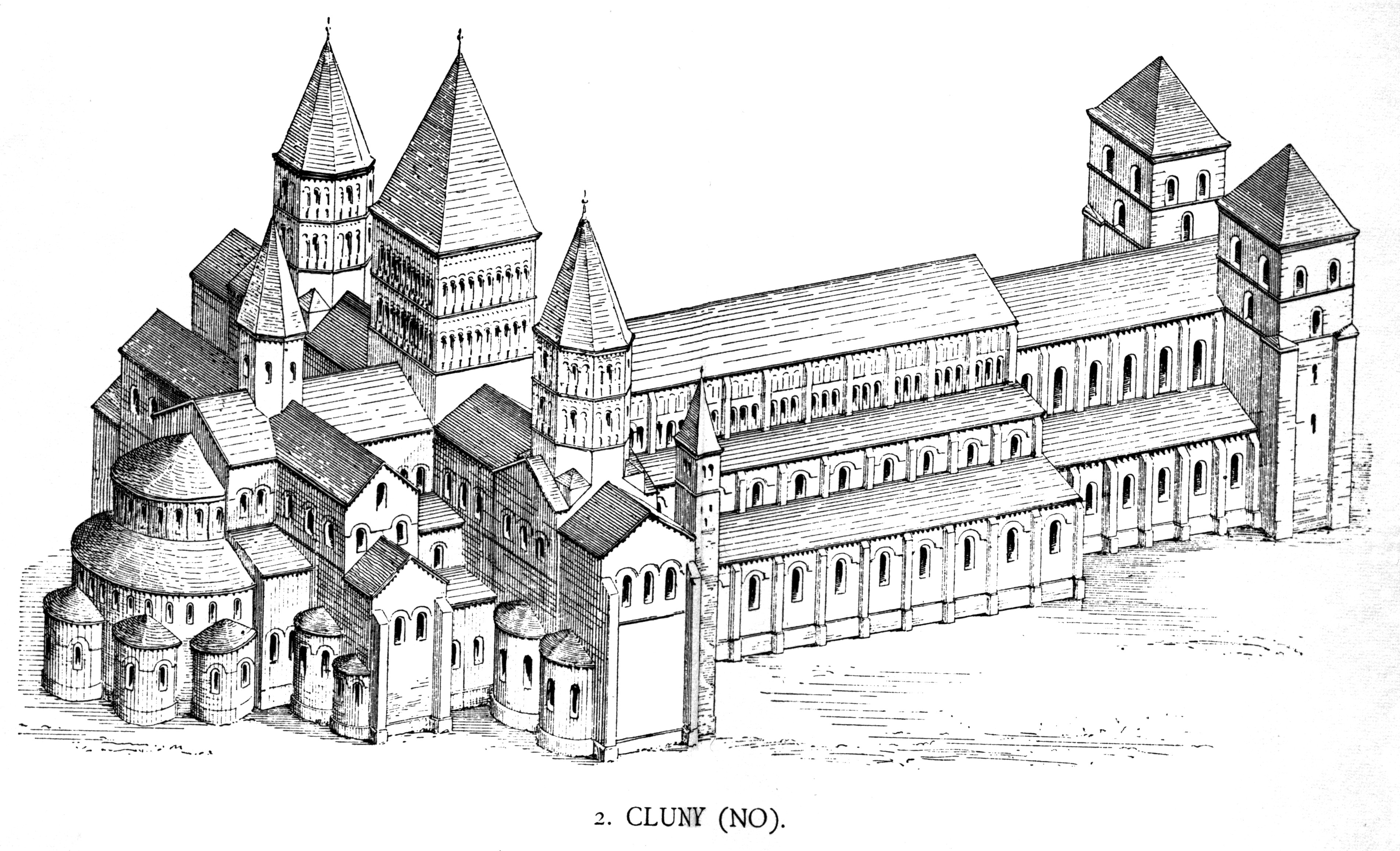
Cluny III, reconstruction.

== Cluniac prayer ==
O God, by whose grace thy servants, the Holy Abbots of Cluny, enkindled with the fire of thy love, became burning and shining lights in thy Church : Grant that we also may be aflame with the spirit of love and discipline, and may ever walk before thee as children of light; through Jesus Christ our Lord, who with thee, in the unity of the Holy Spirit, liveth and reigneth, one God, now and forever.

== Arts ==
At Cluny, the central activity was the liturgy; it was extensive and beautifully presented in inspiring surroundings, reflecting the new personally-felt wave of piety of the 11th century. Monastic intercession was believed indispensable to achieving a state of grace, and lay rulers competed to be remembered in Cluny's endless prayers; this inspired the endowments in land and benefices that made other arts possible.

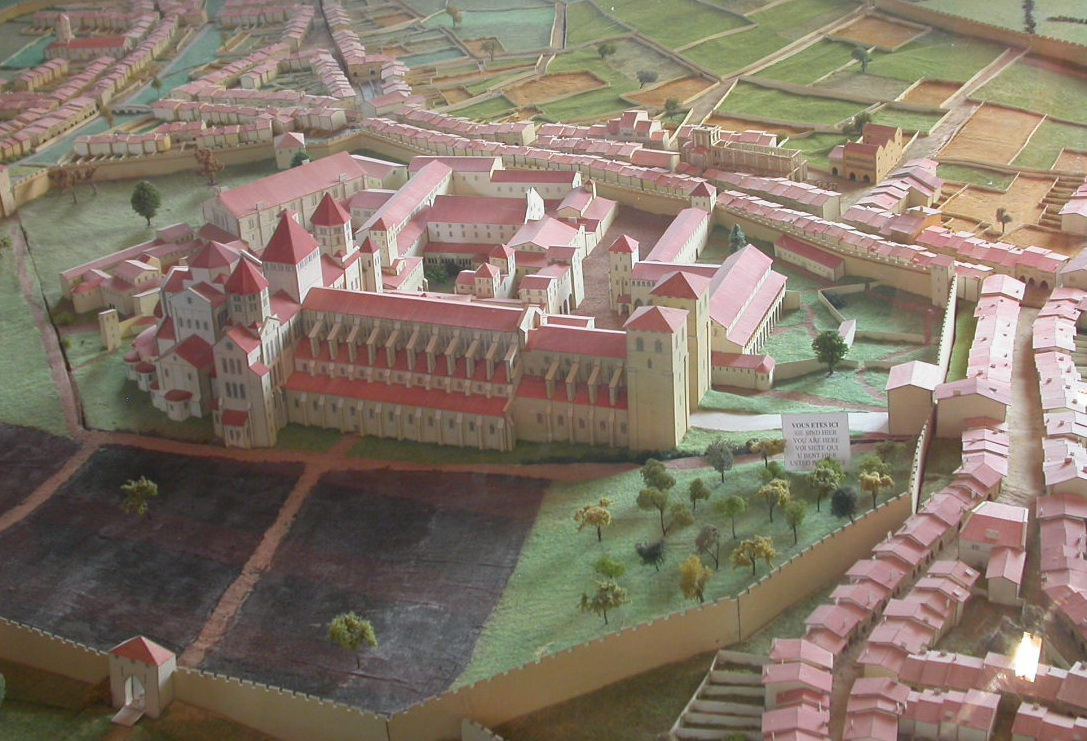
Model of Cluny III

The fast-growing community at Cluny required buildings on a large scale. The examples at Cluny profoundly affected architectural practice in Western Europe from the tenth through the twelfth centuries. The three successive churches are conventionally called Cluny I, II and III. The construction of Cluny II, ca. 955–981, begun after the destructive Hungarian raids of 953, led the tendency for Burgundian churches to be stone-vaulted.

=== Cluny III ===
In 1088, Abbot Hugh of Semur (1024 – 1109, abbot from 1049) started the construction of the third and final church at Cluny, which was to become the largest church building in Europe and remained so until the 16th century, when Old St. Peter's Basilica in Rome was replaced by the present church. Hézelon de Liège was called to act as architect for the new church in 1088. Though Cluny III has been largely destroyed, the Basilica of Paray-le-Monial gives a good impression of its original appearance. It had two pairs of transepts, five towers, a narthex the size of a church in its own right and a pointed barrel vault covering the whole.

The building campaign was financed by the annual census established by Ferdinand I of León, ruler of a united León-Castile, some time between 1053 and 1065. (Alfonso VI re-established it in 1077, and confirmed it in 1090.) Ferdinand fixed the sum at 1,000 golden aurei, an amount which Alfonso VI doubled in 1090. This was the biggest annuity that the Order ever received from king or layman, and it was never surpassed. Henry I of England's annual grant from 1131 of 100 marks of silver, not gold, seemed little by comparison. The Alfonsine census enabled Abbot Hugh (who died in 1109) to undertake construction of the huge third abbey church. When payments in aurei later lapsed, the Cluniac order suffered a financial crisis that crippled them during the abbacies of Pons of Melgueil (1109–1125) and Peter the Venerable (1122–1156). The Spanish wealth donated to Cluny publicised the rise of the Spanish Christians, and drew central Spain for the first time into the larger European orbit.

== Library ==
The Cluny library was one of the richest and most important in France and Europe. It was a storehouse of numerous very valuable manuscripts. During the religious conflicts of 1562, the Huguenots sacked the abbey, destroying or dispersing many of the manuscripts. Of those that were left, some were burned in 1790 by a rioting mob during the French Revolution. Others still were stored away in the Cluny town hall.

The French Government worked to relocate such treasures, including those that ended up in private hands. They are now held by the Bibliothèque nationale de France at Paris. The British Museum holds some sixty charters originating from Cluny.

== Organisation ==
The Abbey of Cluny differed in three ways from other Benedictine houses and confederations:

- organisational structure;
- prohibition on holding land by feudal service; and
- emphasis on the liturgy as its main form of work.

Cluny developed a highly centralized form of government entirely foreign to Benedictine tradition. While most Benedictine monasteries remained autonomous and associated with each other only informally, Cluny created a large, federated order in which the administrators of subsidiary houses served as deputies of the abbot of Cluny and answered to him. The Cluniac houses, being directly under the supervision of the abbot of Cluny, the head of the Order, were styled priories, not abbeys. The priors, or chiefs of priories, met at Cluny once a year to deal with administrative issues and to make reports. Many other Benedictine monasteries, even those of earlier formation, came to regard Cluny as their guide. When in 1016 Pope Benedict VIII decreed that the privileges of Cluny be extended to subordinate houses, there was further incentive for Benedictine communities to join the Cluniac Order.

Partly due to the Order's opulence, the Cluniac monasteries of nuns were not seen as being particularly cost-effective. The Order did not have an interest in founding many new houses for women, so their presence was always limited.

The customs of Cluny represented a shift from the earlier ideal of a Benedictine monastery as an agriculturally self-sufficient unit. The Benedictine model was similar to the contemporary villa of the more Romanised parts of Europe and the manor of the more feudal parts, in which each member did physical labour as well as offering prayer.

In 817 St Benedict of Aniane, the "second Benedict", developed monastic constitutions at the urging of Louis the Pious to govern all the Carolingian monasteries. He acknowledged that the Black Monks no longer supported themselves by physical labour. Cluny's agreement to offer perpetual prayer (laus perennis, literally "perpetual praise") meant that it had increased a specialization in roles.

As perhaps the wealthiest monastic house of the Western world, Cluny hired managers and workers to do the traditional labour of monks. The Cluniac monks devoted themselves to almost constant prayer, thus elevating their position into a profession. At least by the 1100s, Cluniac monks recited 138 psalms each day, rising to 215 in Lent.

Despite the monastic ideal of a frugal life, Cluny Abbey commissioned candelabras of solid silver and gold chalices made with precious gems for use at the abbey Masses. Instead of being limited to the traditional fare of broth and porridge, the monks ate very well, enjoying roasted chickens (a luxury in France then), wines from their vineyards and cheeses made by their employees. The monks wore the finest linen religious habits and silk vestments at Mass. Artefacts exemplifying the wealth of Cluny Abbey are today on display at the Musée de Cluny in Paris.

== Cluny's influence ==
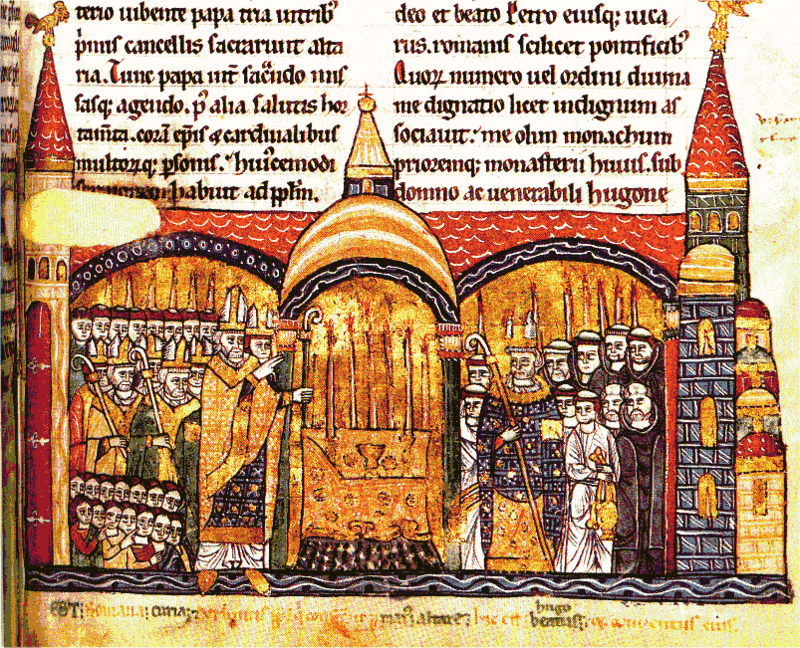
The Consecration of Cluny III by Pope Urban II, 12th century (Bibliothèque Nationale de France).

The abbey at Cluny was the motherhouse of the Congregation of Cluny.

In the fragmented and localized Europe of the 10th and 11th centuries, the Cluniac network extended its reforming influence far. Free of lay and episcopal interference, and responsible only to the papacy (which was in a state of weakness and disorder, with rival popes supported by competing nobles), Cluny was seen to have revitalized the Norman church, reorganized the royal French monastery at Fleury and inspired St Dunstan in England.

The early Cluniac establishments had offered refuges from a disordered world but by the late 11th century, Cluniac piety permeated society. This is the period that achieved the final Christianization of the heartland of Europe. By the twelfth century there were 314 monasteries across Europe paying allegiance to Cluny.

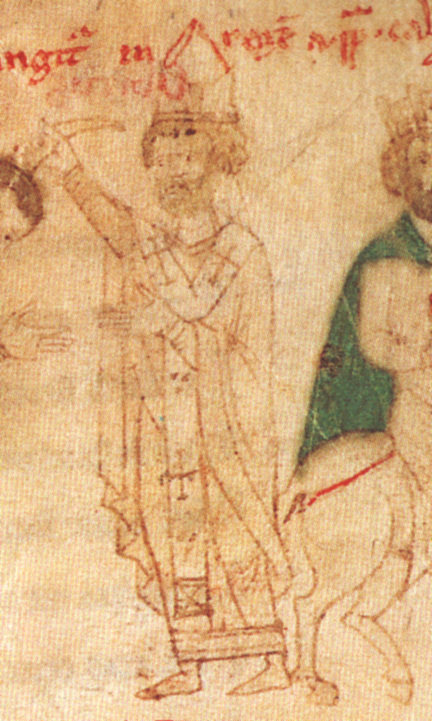
Pope Callixtus II was elected at the papal election, 1119 at Cluny.

Within his order, the abbot of Cluny was free to assign any monk to any house; he created a fluid structure around a central authority that was to become a feature of the royal chanceries of England and of France, and of the bureaucracy of the great independent dukes, such as that of Burgundy. Cluny's highly centralized hierarchy was a training ground for Catholic prelates: four monks of Cluny became popes - Gregory VII, Urban II, Paschal II and Urban V.

An orderly succession of able and educated abbots, drawn from the highest aristocratic circles, led Cluny, and the first six abbots of Cluny were all canonized:

1. St. Berno of Cluny (died 927)
2. St. Odo of Cluny (died 942)
3. St. Aymard of Cluny (died 965)
4. St. Majolus of Cluny (died 994)
5. St. Odilo (died 1049)
6. St. Hugh of Cluny (died 1109)

== Burials ==
- Herman I, Margrave of Baden
- Philip I, Duke of Burgundy
- Pope Gelasius II

== See also ==
- Cluniac Order
- Bible de Souvigny
- Abbot of Cluny
- Berno of Cluny
- Le jongleur de Notre-Dame
- Musée de Cluny
- High medieval domes

== Sources ==
- Cowdrey, H. E. J. (1970). The Cluniacs and the Gregorian Reform. Oxford: Clarendon Press. ISBN 0-19-826429-1.
- Hopkins, Daniel J., ed. (1997). "Cluny". Merriam-Webster's Geographical Dictionary (Third ed.). Springfield, MA: Merriam-Webster, Inc. Publishers. p. 262. ISBN 0-87779-546-0.
