= Daventry Priory =

Priory in Daventry, England

Daventry Priory was a priory in Daventry, Northamptonshire, England.

The Priory was founded by Hugh de Leicester, sheriff of Northamptonshire, in the 1090s, with the permission of his lord, the Earl of Northampton. The Earl had already founded a Cluniac priory in Northampton, a cell of La Charité sur Loire, and Hugh's new priory followed this pattern.

Over the next few centuries, Daventry was patronised by local gentry and nobility in return for masses said for their souls. But the Priory declined in the fifteenth century and Cardinal Wolsey obtained permission from Pope Clement VII in 1524 to dissolve it, in order to found Christ Church, Oxford.
