= Maiolus of Cluny =

French abbot of Cluny (c.906–994)

Saint Majolus of Cluny
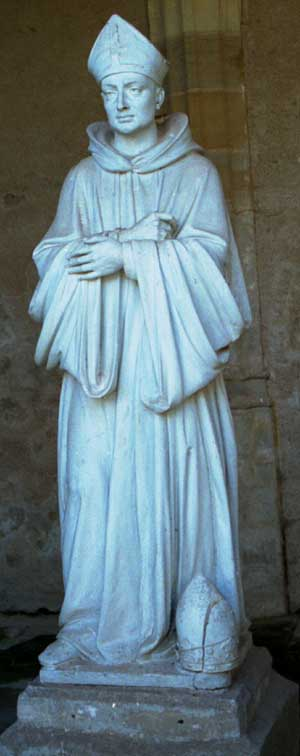
- Statue of Majolus, Souvigny

Confessor
- Born: c. 906; Avignon (sometimes stated as Valensole)
- Died: May 11, 994; Souvigny
- Venerated in: Roman Catholic Church; Eastern Orthodox Church
- Feast: May 11

Majolus of Cluny (Maieul, Mayeul, Mayeule, Mayol) (c. 906 – May 11, 994) was the fourth abbot of Cluny. Majolus was very active in reforming individual communities of monks and canons; first, as a personal commission, requested and authorized by the Emperor or other nobility. Later, he found it more effective to affiliate some of the foundations to the motherhouse at Cluny to lessen the likelihood of later relapse.

He travelled widely and was recognized as a person of influence both at Rome and the Imperial court. He is buried at the Priory of Souvigny, along with Odilo, the fifth abbot of Cluny, and commemorated individually on May 11, and also on April 29 with four other early abbots of Cluny.

== Vitae ==
There are two "lives" written about Majolus: one by Syrius, a monk of Cluny; and one by Odilo, the fifth abbot of Cluny.

== Life ==
Majolus' father, named "Fulcher", was from a wealthy provincial family of Avignon. His mother was named Raimodis. They had two sons: Majolus and Cynricus. It is not known for sure which was the older, but traditionally the younger sons of noble families were given to the church and the elder sons were made the heirs to the father's estate, hence because Majolus became a monk, it is sometimes assumed he is the younger.

Around 916, Majolus fled his family's estates near Rietz to stay with relatives at Mâcon due to the feudal wars. Both his parents died while he was young.

=== Lyons and Macon ===
Majolus studied the liberal arts at Lyon and became canon, and later archdeacon of Mâcon; his ordination to the priesthood was in Mâcon. While in Mâcon he gave classes to a large body of clerks for free. He built a small oratory on the opposite side of the river from the town, where he would retire for prayer. In personal habits he was always kind, never telling lies, detraction or flattery, and he was severe against sinners, if it was necessary to call them to repent. He gained a reputation among the local people as a holy person and so when Besançon needed a new bishop, many people, called on him to become bishop, but he refused.

There was a famine at the time and Majolus prayed for help for those begging for food. One day as he prayed seven solidi (gold coins) appeared in front of him. He was afraid that this was a trick from the devil or that the money was lost, and he wouldn't touch it. But when he discovered the money was real and no one claimed it, he then used it to buy food for the poor that were starving.

=== Monk ===
He decided instead to enter Cluny Abbey, which he had visited previously. Aymard of Cluny was Abbot at the time. Aymard appointed Majolus "armarius" (book-keeper and master of ceremonies). He was later made librarian. He had read the poems of Virgil and he considered that monks should not read these works, but that the Bible alone was enough for them. He was very harsh in the discipline he applied to new monks.

He was sent with a fellow monk from Cluny to Rome, on one occasion, and on the return journey his companion became sick. Majolus waited by the suffering monk for three days with much anxiety, and on the third night he dreamed that he saw a white-haired old man who said 'Why art thou cast down in idle grief? Hast thou forgotten what my brother James orders for the sick?' He then woke up and realized that it was referring to the sacrament of extreme unction mentioned in the letter of James (5:14-15). He then anointed his brother-monk with the holy oil and the sick monk then started to recover from his illness. This miracle was then told at Cluny, and the monks held Majolus in veneration.

=== Abbot of Cluny ===
Around 948, Majolus became coadjutor to Abbot Aymard. Aymard became blind, and he resigned his abbacy, recommending that the monks choose to elect a new abbot and suggested they choose Majolus as abbot, but he refused. However, Majolus dreamt that Benedict appeared to him and told him to accept the responsibility of the office and that this book would be his guide. The next day Majolus addressed the monks and said, "Now in Him who is able to smooth over rough places, to raise up heavy burdens, and to overthrow the adversary, I place my hope, and submit myself to your unchanged command." Majolus became abbot about the year 954.

The construction of Cluny II, ca. 955–981, begun after the destructive Hungarian raids of 953, led the tendency for Burgundian churches to be stone-vaulted. The replacement abbey church of Cluny II was consecrated in 981. The relics of Peter and Paul were taken from Rome to Cluny during Majolus' abbacy.

=== Captivity ===
In 972 Majolus visited the Imperial Court in Pavia and returned through the alps by way of the Saint Bernard Pass in Provence. A number of monks and others accompanying were captured by the Arabs from Fraxinet. Much venerated by his monks, a ransom was quickly raised. The monks responded, however, once their abbot was released, by stirring up a fury in Provence against the raiders. The peasantry and the nobles together implored their overlord William Count of Provence, to act.

William, equally disturbed by the treatment of the abbot, raised a feudal host and took to the offensive. His army consisted not only of men from Provence, but also the lower Dauphiné and Nice. He defeated the Muslims at the Battle of Tourtour, thus securing the mountain passes.

=== Political life ===
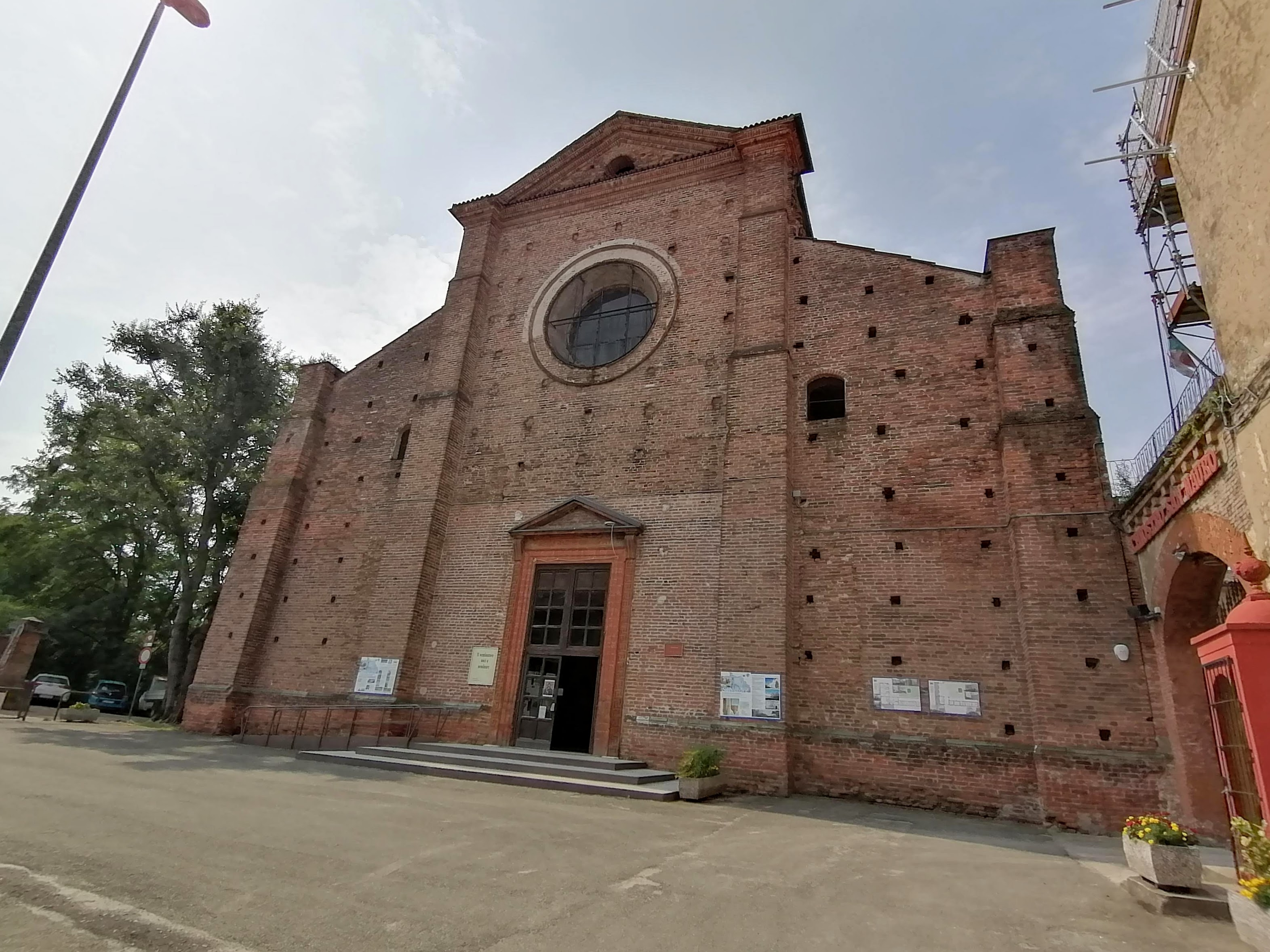
Pavia, Basilica of Santissimo Salvatore

The Holy Roman Emperor Otto I had a good relationship with Majolus, as did his wife Adelheid of Burgundy. In 971, Majolus founded the Monastery of San Salvatore in Lombardy with Adelaide's support. Majolus visited the imperial court in Pavia at the Emperor's request, and many people sought out Majolus as an intermediary to help them with their petitions. He supposedly predicted the Emperor's death, when he had a dream seeing a lion in a cage that burst through its chains. Majolus interpreted that as a sign that the Emperor would die that year. Not long after this dream, the Emperor did die.

In 974 Adelheid and her son Otto II, summoned Majolus to Italy to make him Pope, but Majolus refused. Otto II married Theophanu, a relative of the Byzantine Emperor John I Tzimiskes. She was frequently at odds with her mother-in-law, Adelaide, which caused an estrangement between mother and son. In Pavia, around 980, Otto II and his mother, the dowager empress, were reconciled after years of being apart, in part through the efforts of Majolus. This episode and other convinced contemporaries of the influence that Majolus and Cluny had over the Emperor. Majolus advised the Emperor against his Italian campaign in 983, telling him that he would die if he went on it, and the Emperor died in that year.

== Monastic Reform ==
Up until that time, Benedictine houses were autonomous. The Cluniac reform movement had already begun with Berno of Cluny at the beginning of the 10th century, but the monasteries reformed by the monks of Cluny during the tenures of Odo and Aymard (2nd and 3rd abbots of Cluny) remained independent of Cluny. Reform was the personal work of the abbot, and it was not uncommon for the abbots of Cluny to hold abbacies at two or more monasteries. The relationship, however, was with the abbot, not with Cluny, and on the death of the abbot, rather than the position reverting to Cluny, the monks continued to elect their own successor abbot.

He reformed many German monasteries at the request of Emperor Otto the Great. In 972 Otto appointed Majolus abbot of Sant'Apollinare in Classe, near Ravenna. He reformed San Giovanni Evangelista in Parma in 982, and the canons at Monte Celio in Pavia in 987. At some point between 966 and 990, King Conrad of Burgundy renounced all rights and gave Romainmôtier Priory to Abbot Majolus. In the 980s Henry I, Duke of Burgundy asked Majolus to take charge of the Abbey of Saint-Germain d'Auxerre. Majolus would appoint a prior to manage things in his absence, but not necessarily a monk of Cluny.

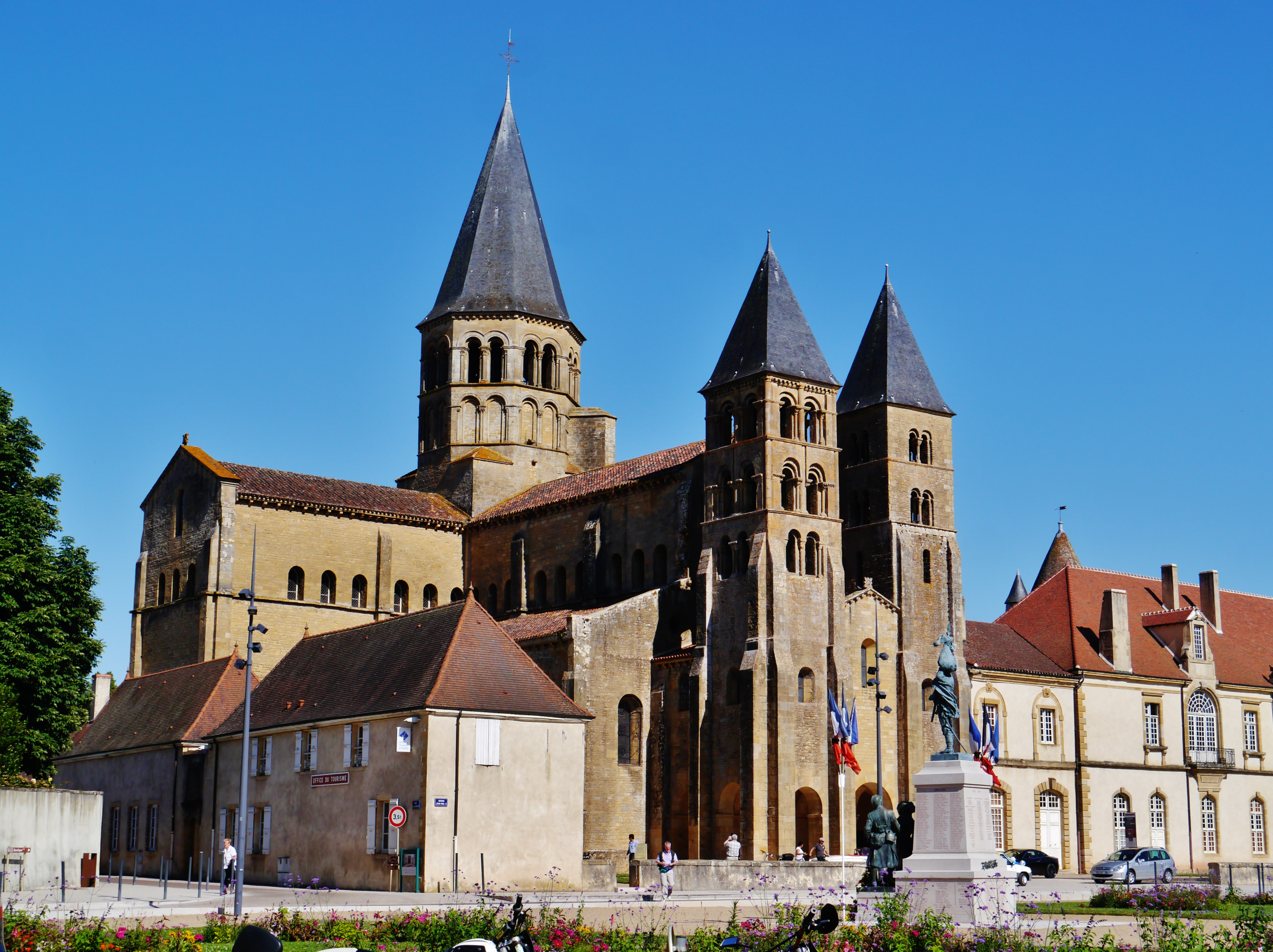
Paray-le-Monial Basilique Sacré-Coeur

Under Majolus, a network of monasteries dependent under Cluny's leadership began to take shape and would continue to develop under Majolus' successors Odilo and Hugh. In 965, the Empress Adelaide placed Payerne Priory under Cluny Abbey. The Priory of Paray-le-Monial was founded by Lambert of Chalon and his wife, Adelaide of Chalon, both friends of Abbot Majolus, in 973 as a house of Cluny. In 989 Bruno of Roucy, Bishop of Langres, requested Majolus, to send monks to re-settle the Abbey of St. Benignus in Dijon, grown decadent, as a Cluniac house. Among places that Cluny reformed or gave support to during this period include Saint-Maur-des-Fossés. Majolus sent William of Volpiano to reform the Abbey of Saint-Sernin at Toulouse.

Cluny's wealth and property grew as people donated gave gifts of land, churches, and other valuables. possessions, which periodically gave rise to disputes between Cluny and various feudal lords. Cluny was not known for the severity of its discipline or its asceticism, but the abbots of Cluny supported the revival of the papacy and the reforms of Pope Gregory VII. The Cluniac establishment found itself closely identified with the Papacy. The Popes in this time period were strongly supportive to Cluny and they placed the penalty of excommunication upon anyone who disturbed or usurped Cluny's rights.

== Character ==
Majolus was revered in his own time as a holy man. He spent much time in prayer and solitude, he rebuked sinners, he disliked public praise and high honours, but he would do much good in secret away from the eyes of the public. Whenever he went on a journey he would have an open book in his hand, which could be either a spiritual or philosophical work, which he would read as he rode. He had great knowledge of the scriptures and other subjects, but would never show off his knowledge to anyone, and would only speak when asked his opinion on something. He always spoke very briefly. He was not extreme in asceticism, whenever he sat down at table with the rich or powerful, he would eat the same things they would; he wore decent clothes that were neither too shabby nor too expensive. He drank a little wine. He was said to be a very gentle and kind person.

== Miracles ==
Vita S. Maioli attributes a number of miracles to Majolus, some of them are reported as happening during his lifetime. Majolus was said to have cured the sick, restored sight to the blind, healed those bitten by serpent, dogs or wolves, he also miraculously rescued people from death by drowning or fire. Among the stories of miracles attributed to him, the following are here related:

Once when Majolus was returning from Aquitaine, he decided to visit a monastery along the way and sent a messenger ahead of him to say he was coming. The monks of this monastery were happy that he was coming, but the purveyor of the monastery felt bad because they had run out of fish. However, the purveyor of the monastery told the monks to go down to the river and call on the name of Majolus, and when they did, they caught an enormously large salmon.

The water that Majolus used to wash his hands in was said to have healing powers. Once in Vallavaense a blind mendicant caught hold of Majolus' bridle as he was leaving the town and begged Majolus to bless water in a jar he had brought. Majolus was moved by this show of faith and so he blessed the water. The beggar then washed his eyes with the water and received his sight.

One time several pilgrims returning from his tomb reached the Loire river and they could not cross it because the boat was on the other side, and the boatman refused to come over for them. They called on the name of Majolus, and the boat crossed over by itself to them, waited for them to enter, and when they got in, it took them without being rowed to the other side of the river.

A woman who brought her dead child to Majolus' tomb in Souvigny. She put the body of her child in front of the altar, where it remained the whole night. At nine o'clock in the morning the eyes of the boy opened and the boy called for his mother, who ran to him.

== Death ==
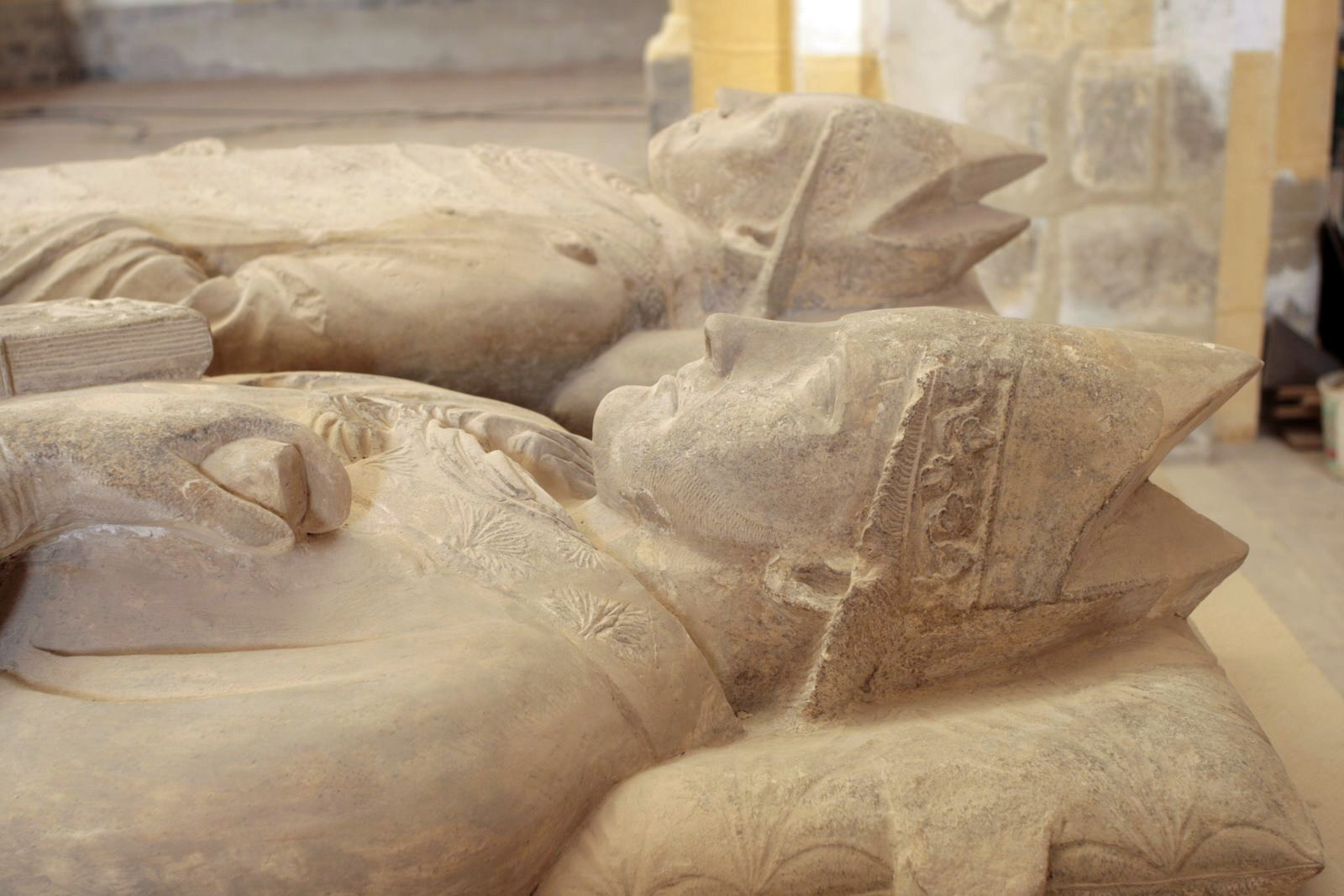
Tombs of Mayeul and Odilo, Souvigny

Majolus lived to the old age of 84. Two years before he died, he gave up the abbacy and made Odilo his coadjutor, just as Aymard had done with him many years earlier. He retired to one of the smaller Cluniac houses where he devoted time to serving the brothers there by instruction, correction and inspiration. He continued to work even into his old age, and he died on his way to reform Saint-Denis in Paris. He did not get far and stopped at Souvigny Priory, where he died and was buried.

== Veneration ==
After he died, the monks at Cluny wanted to bring him to Cluny, but the monks at Sovigny protested and insisted that he remain there. The tomb of Majolus became the focus of pilgrimages. Hugh Capet, King of France, came there in 994 after the death of Mayeul. His feast day is May 11; he is also commemorated on April 29, the Feast of the Holy Abbots of Cluny", along with Odo, Odilo of Cluny, and Hugh of Cluny.

== Sources ==
- Smith, Lucy Margaret (1920). The Early History of the Monastery of Cluny. Oxford University Press.

Catholic Church titles
Preceded by Aymard of Cluny	Abbot of Cluny; 964-994	Succeeded by Odilo
