= Abbot of Cluny =

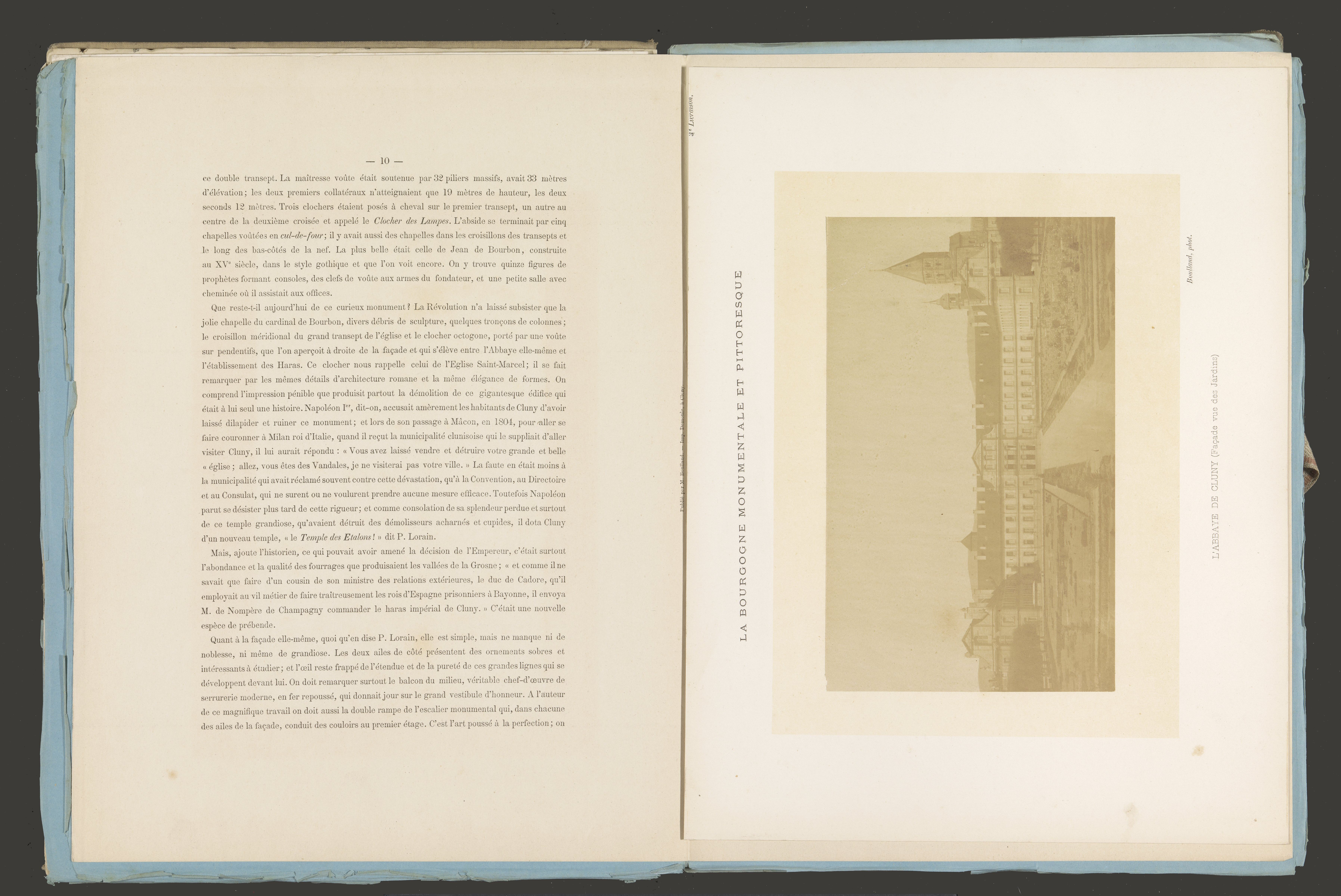

The Abbot of Cluny was the head of the powerful monastery of the Abbey of Cluny in medieval France. The following is a list of occupants of the position.

== List of abbots ==
909	927	Berno
927	942	Odo
942	964	Aymard of Cluny (co-abbot with Maiolus from 954)
964	994	Maiolus
994	1049	Odilo
1049	1109	Hugh I
1109	1122	Pontius of Melgueil
1122	1122	Hugh II
1122	1156	Peter the Venerable
1157	1157	Robert Grossus
1157	1163	Hugh III
1163	1173	Stephan I
1173	1176	Radulf (Raoul) de Sully
1176	1177	Gauthier de Châtillon
1177	1179	William I
1179	1183	Thibaud de Vermandois
1183	1199	Hugh IV de Clermont
1199	1207	Hugh V of Anjou
1207	1215	William II
1215	1220	Giraud
1220	1228	Roland de Hainaut
1228	1230	Barthélemy de Florange
1230	1236	Stephan II
1230	1235	Stephan III
1235	1244	Hugh de Courtenay
1244	1257	William III
1257	1270	Yves I de Poyson
1270	1295	Yves II de Chassant
1295		William IV d'Igé
1295	1308	Bertrand I de Colombiers
1308	1319	Henry I de Faultrière
1319	1322	Raymond de Bonn I
1322	1344	Peter II de Chastelux
1344	1347	Itère de Miremande
1347	1351	Hugh
1351	1361	Androin de la Roche
1361	1369	Simon I de Brosse
1369	1374	John I du Pin
1374	1383	Jacques de Cozan
1383	1400	Jean II de Damas-Cozan
1400	1416	Raymond II de Cadoène
1416	1423	Robert II de Chaudesolles
1423	1456	Eude de la Pierre
1456	1480	John de Bourbon
1481	1510	Jacques d'Amboise
1510	1518	Geoffroy d'Amboise
1518	1528	Eymard Gouffier
1528	1550	Jean IV de Lorraine
1550	1574	Charles de Lorraine
1575	1612	Claude de Guise
1612	1621	Louis de Lorraine
1621	1629	Jacques de Veny d'Arbouze
1635	1642	Cardinal Richelieu
1642	1654	Armand de Bourbon, Prince of Conti
1654	1661	Jules Mazarin
1661	1672	Rinaldo d'Este
1672	1683	Henri Bertrand de Beuvron
1683	1715	Emmanuel Théodose de la Tour d'Auvergne
1715	1747	Henri-Oswald de la Tour d'Auvergne
1747	1757	Frédéric Jérôme de La Rochefoucauld
1757	1790	Dominique de La Rochefoucauld
