= Aymard of Cluny =

Saint Aymard of Cluny

Abbot of Cluny
- Born: unknown France
- Died: 965; Cluny, France
- Venerated in: Catholic Church, Eastern Orthodox Church
- Feast: October 5

Aymard of Cluny, also known as Aymardus of Cluny, was the third abbot of Cluny. His feast day is 5 October.

== Election ==
Very little is known about his life and the only references come from the biographies of Odo of Cluny or Majolus of Cluny.

Odo, the second Abbot of Cluny spent a great deal of time in Italy in the last five years of his life. It is thought that Aymardus must have been appointed as Odo's replacement in running the monastery during this time while he was gone.

When Odo died in the year 942, the other monks of Cluny wanted their prior, Hildebrand to become Abbot, but Hildebrand refused to become abbot. So they elected Aymardus to be abbot instead. On the day of his election, Aymardus was supposedly seen entering the monastery leading a horse carrying fish, and the monks were so struck by the sight that they immediately elected him abbot.

== Abbot of Cluny ==
Like Odo and Berno before him, Aymardus also was devoted to upholding the Rule of St Benedict in an unstained form. However, unlike Odo, Aymardus took greater attention to the material concerns of the monastery and took efforts at organizing the gifts that the monastery received in a practical way. Cluny's property expanded in his time as abbot and he was remembered as having good organizational skills over all the properties that were owned by the monastery.

Two additional monasteries came under Cluny's jurisdiction when Aymardus was abbot, which were Celsiniacus (Sauxillanges), and the Abbey of St Amand's near St Paul-Trois-Chateaux.

== Blindness ==
Aymardus became blind in his last years and he resigned as abbot in the year 954; he still had eleven years left in his life. He was said to have bore his blindness without uttering the slightest complaint about it.

Aymardus called on the monks to elect a new abbot, and he urged them to elect Majolus of Cluny, and they therefore did so. He said, 'Ill, blind, and weary, I can no longer be responsible for the interests of the monastery, nor fittingly watch over its welfare. For it is well known that not only is the spirit of bravery in soldiers derived from their kind, and their courage from his magnanimity and boldness, but that if he, their leader, is remiss, they too lose their virtue. The health of the whole body is in the head, and if it is sound, so are the members. If the king loses courage, all his followers, even the strongest and most manly, are overcome with womanly fears. If the head is injured the whole body suffers. Now I who lead you in the celestial militia before the whole church, watch over your welfare as your head. I am old, infirm, blind, and cannot longer retain this responsibility. Exercise, therefore, your discretion and choose a father who will lead you in the way of God, and as a column of light in the night of offence direct your steps. For if a ship without a rudder cannot reach port neither can your souls without a pilot.'

Majolus initially hesitate for three days to accept the position of abbot, but eventually he gave in and accepted.

After Majolus became abbot, Aymardus went to live the rest of his years in the infirmary. A story about him says that one day he wanted a piece of cheese and he asked a monk to go to the cellar to get it for him. The monk replied that having so many abbots was a nuisance, and he couldn't follow all of their commands. He then brooded over the insult and asked to be taken to the chapter house. He approached Majolus and said 'Brother Majolus, I did not set thee over me that thou shouldst persecute me, or order me about as a master orders a slave, but that as a son thou mightest have compassion on thy father.' and after many other words he then said, 'Art thou indeed my monk?' Majolus replied that he was and so Aymardus said, 'If that be so, give up thy seat and take the one thou hadst before.' Immediately Majolus obeyed and Aymardus sat on the abbot's chair. He then accused the monk who didn't get him the piece of cheese and called on him to do penance. Then he got off of the abbot's chair and ordered Majolus to go back and sit on it again.

Aymardus' name still appears in records of Cluny as being an abbot for years after his resignation, but few details are known about him in that period. He died in the year 965.

== See also ==
- List of Catholic saints
- Cluniac reforms
