= Odilo of Cluny =

Benedictine Abbot of Cluny (c.962–1049)

Saint Odilo of Cluny
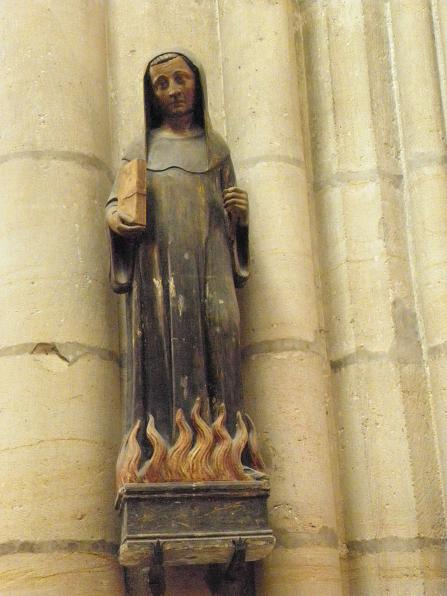
- Statue of St. Odilo of Cluny in Basilica of St. Urban, Troyes, France.

Confessor
- Born: c. 962
- Died: 1 January 1049
- Venerated in: Roman Catholic Church; Eastern Orthodox Church
- Feast: 11 May; 19 January (Cluny); in Switzerland on 6 February.

Odilo of Cluny (c. 962 – 1 January 1049) was the 5th Benedictine Abbot of Cluny, succeeding Mayeul and holding the post for around 54 years. During his tenure Cluny became the most important monastery in western Europe. Odilo actively worked to reform the monastic practices not only at Cluny, but at other Benedictine houses. He also promoted the Truce of God whereby military hostilities were temporarily suspended at certain times for ostensibly religious reasons. Odilo encouraged the formal practice of personal consecration to Mary. He established All Souls' Day (on 2 November) in Cluny and its monasteries as the annual commemoration to pray for all the faithful departed. The practice was soon adopted throughout the whole Western church. He was a lifelong friend of William of Dijon, another Cluniac abbot and reformer.

== Early life ==
Odilo was descended from an illustrious noble family of Auvergne (central France). The son of Berald de Mercoeur and Gerberga, his widowed mother became a nun at the convent of St. John in Autun after his father's death. Odilo had eight brothers and two sisters. One of his sisters married and the other became an abbess.

When he was a child, he was partially paralyzed and had to be carried by the family servants on a stretcher. One day while the family was travelling, they came to a church and Odilo was left with the luggage at the church door. The door was open, and little Odilo felt God was calling him to crawl to the altar. He got to the altar and tried to stand up, but failed. He tried again and finally succeeded: he was able to walk around the altar. It was believed that he had been cured of the unnamed malady by the intervention of Our Lady.

As a child, he developed a great devotion to the Virgin Mary. While still quite young, he entered the seminary of St. Julien in Brioude, where he became a specialist in canon law. William of Dijon persuaded him to enter the monastery of Cluny. In 991, at the age of twenty-nine, he entered Cluny and before the end of his year of probation was made coadjutor to Abbot Mayeul, and shortly before the latter's death (994) was made abbot and received Holy orders.

== Odilo’s abbacy ==
His fifty years as Abbot were distinguished for the exceeding gentleness of his rule. It was usual with him to say that, of two extremes, he chose rather to offend by tenderness than a too rigid severity. He was known for showing mercy indiscriminately even to those who people said did not deserve it. He would say in response, ‘I would rather be mercifully judged for having shown mercy, than be cruelly damned for having shown cruelty."

Of small stature and insignificant appearance, Odilo was a man of immense force of character. He was a man of prayer and penance, with a great devotion to the Incarnation and to the Blessed Mother. Odilo encouraged the formal practice of personal consecration to Mary. He also encouraged learning in his monasteries, and had the monk Rodolfus Glaber write a history of the time. He erected a magnificent monastery building, and furthered the reform of the Benedictine monasteries. It was during his abbacy that Cluny became the most important monastery in western Europe. During a great famine in 1006, his liberality to the poor was by many censured as profuse; for he melted down the sacred vessels and ornaments to raise funds.

Pope John XIX offered Odilo the archbishopric of Lyons, but Odilo refused and the pope then chided Odilo for disobedience. John XIX died shortly after and his successor (Benedict IX) did not press the matter any further.

He is also said to have influenced the course of the famous pilgrimage route to Santiago, which runs near the monasteries.

=== Monastic autonomy ===
During this period it was very common for secular lords and local rulers to try to either take control of monasteries or to seize their property. Not only this, but local bishops often also tried to impose their own authority on monasteries or to seize monastery property. It was precisely for this reason that from the earliest days of Cluny's history, Cluny did not affiliate itself with the authority of any diocese except Rome and received its charter directly from the Pope. Several Popes decreed an automatic excommunication to any bishop or secular ruler who tried to interfere or seize Cluniac property (including both the monastery and all the monasteries and properties that were owned by Cluny). However, many times the monks needed this order of excommunication renewed and repeated by the Popes because each new generation would bring a new round of figures who would go after Cluniac property. All of the abbots of Cluny in this period had to deal with this problem, and Odilo was no exception.

He attended the Synod of Ansa in 994 for this reason and successfully got the bishops present at the synod to make a statement excommunicating anyone who attacked Cluniac property. In 997 he went to Rome to make secure the status of Cluny. In 998 he obtained from Pope Gregory V. Cluny complete freedom by the diocesan Bishop and 1024 the extension of this privilege on all dependent Cluny abbeys and priories.

In 1025 Gauzlin, bishop of Mâcon, claimed that the archbishop of Vienne needed his approval to give ordination to monks in Cluny. In answer to this Odilo produced the papal documents granting Cluny freedom from local diocesan control. A council at Ansa in southern Gaul nevertheless condemned Odilo's position because it claimed that the Council of Chalcedon (in 451) had decreed that the ordination of monks had to occur with diocesan consent. In answer to this, the Pope then wrote letters to various parties involved with the dispute and condemned Gauzlin's position. The Pope further decreed that any bishop who tried to enter a Cluniac monastery to even celebrate a mass would suffer automatic excommunication, unless he had been invited by the abbot. The dispute went on for years.

In Germany the Cluny policy had no permanent success, as the monks there were more inclined to individualism. Odilo visited Henry II on several occasions and because of his closeness to him, he was able to intercede on several occasions for people who had disputes with him. When Henry II was crowned King of Italy in 1004, Odilo attended the ceremony. The following day there was a revolt against Henry in Pavia which was quickly crushed and the defeated party went to find Odilo so that he could ask Henry on their behalf for mercy. Odilo agreed and was able to persuade Henry, who respected his holiness so greatly, to hold back his hand and give mercy to the rebels. When Henry was crowned as Holy Roman Emperor in Rome in 1014, Odilo also was present. He arrived in Rome before Christmas and spent several months together with Henry up to his coronation in February 1014. The Pope presented Henry with the gift of a golden apple ('orb') with a cross on it, representing his empire. Henry later sent this gift to Cluny. When Henry died in 1024, Cluny's houses said many prayers and masses for him. During the famine of 1006, Odilo sold the gold crown the Holy Roman Emperor Henry II had presented to the abbey, in order to relieve the hunger, thereby saving thousands from starvation.

He also attended the coronation of Conrad II who succeeded Henry and had a similarly good relationship with him, and thus got the Emperor to give favour to Cluny. When there was a failed revolt against Conrad in Pavia in 1026, Odilo again interceded for mercy from the Emperor for the defeated rebels. In 1046 Odilo was present at the coronation of Henry III in Rome.

=== Reform ===
The Rule of St. Benedict was substituted in Cluny for the domestic Rule of Isidore. Under Odilo's rule not only Cluny made rapid progress but Benedictine monasteries in general were reformed and many new foundations made. Odilo threw the full Cluniac influence into the fight against simony, concubinage and the uncanonical marriage of the laity. The abbots of Cluny were constantly called to reform other monasteries; however, many reformed communities soon slipped back into their old ways. Odilo sought to prevent this by making them subject to Cluny: he appointed every prior of every Cluniac house, and the profession of every monk in the remotest monastery was made in his name and subject to his sanction. During his tenure thirty abbeys accepted Cluny as their mother house, and its practices were adopted by many more which did not affiliate. King Robert II of France allied himself with the Reform party. and the Cluniac reform spread through Burgundy, Provence, Auvergne, Poitou, and much of Italy and Spain. The English monastic reform undertaken by Dunstan, Æthelwold of Winchester and Oswald of Worcester under Cluniac influence is a conspicuous instance of Cluny's success by example. On account of his services in the reform Odilo was called by Fulbert of Chartres the "Archangel of the Monks".

=== Truce of God ===
The Truce of God arose in the eleventh century amid the anarchy of feudalism as a remedy for the powerlessness of lay authorities to enforce respect for the public peace. There was then an epidemic of private wars, which made Europe a battlefield bristling with fortified castles and overrun by armed bands who respected nothing, not even sanctuaries, clergy, or consecrated days. Massacres and plunders were common in that age, by the right which every petty lord pretended of revenging his own injuries and quarrels by private wars. Odilo actively promoted the Truce of God whereby military hostilities were suspended at certain times for ostensibly religious reasons. The Truce had great economic importance as it allowed commerce to continue so that people could survive; it also guaranteed sanctuary to those who sought refuge in a church. The penalty for violating the ban was excommunication.

While the Truce of God was a temporary suspension of hostilities, its jurisdiction was broader that the Peace of God. It confirmed permanent peace for all churches and their grounds, the monks, clerks and chattels; all women, pilgrims, merchants and their servants, cattle and horses; and men at work in the fields. For all others peace was required throughout Advent, the season of Lent, and from the beginning of the Rogation days until eight days after Pentecost. This prohibition was subsequently extended to specific days of the week, viz., Thursday, in memory of the Ascension, Friday, the day of the Passion, and Saturday, the day of the Resurrection (council 1041). By the middle of the twelfth century the number of proscribed days was extended until there was left some eighty days for fighting.

== All Souls’ Day ==
According to one tale, a pilgrim was thrown during a storm on an island. There he had a vision of the souls in purgatory enduring the purification pain of flames as punishment for their sins. At home he went to Father Odilo of Cluny to ask whether there is not one day in the year in a special way prayer could be for the souls of the deceased.

Odilo instituted the annual commemoration of all the faithful departed, to be observed by the members of his community with alms, prayers, and sacrifices, for the relief of the suffering souls in purgatory. Odilo decreed that those requesting a Mass be offered for the departed should make a monetary offering for the poor, thus linking almsgiving with fasting and prayer for the dead.

He established All Souls' Day (on 2 November) in Cluny and its monasteries (probably not in 998 but after 1030), and it was soon adopted in the whole Western church.

== Miracles and anecdotes ==
Many miracles were attributed to him by the tradition, such as increases in food or wine, empty bottles of wine filled up again, a fish that he divided to feed more than it could normally feed; he walked on water and ordered his servants to follow him, which they did without falling in. He, finally, healed the sick with touch and making the sign of the cross.

Pope Benedict VIII, who had been a close friend of Cluny, supposedly some time after dying appeared to John, bishop of Porto, along with two of his friends. The Pope claimed that he remained in purgatory, and asked that Odilo be informed so that he could pray for him. A message was given to Odilo, who then proceeded to call on all Cluniac houses to offer up prayers, Masses and alms for the soul of the dead Pope. Not long after this, there was said to be a figure of light followed by a host of others in white garments that entered the cloister and knelt to Odilo; the figure informed him that he was the Pope and that he had now been freed from purgatory.

== Death ==
Many times in his life he visited Rome. In his last visit around the time of a papal election and an imperial coronation, he spent all of his time praying in different churches and in giving alms to the poor. He wished he could die there in Rome, but he then started on his journey back to Cluny. Along the way back, and not far from Rome, he had an accident with his horse that injured him. He had to be taken back to the city where so much grief was poured out for his sake that Masses were offered for his recovery and the Pope visited his bedside. He stayed in the city until Easter and then left again to go back to Cluny. He continued to do his fasts and ascetic practices despite his old age and weakness. He decided to visit all the houses that Cluny had reformed, but when he visited Souvigny Priory he had to stop and remain there. At Christmas he had become so weak that he needed to be carried around the monastery. He was in St Mary's chapel when he died; he was praying for the souls in purgatory when he died.

He died during the night of the New Year 1049, at the age of eighty-seven. After his death, miracles were also reported from his tomb, including healings.

On the night of Odilo's funeral, a monk named Gregorinius saw him. This monk had come a long distance to come to Odilo's funeral. When the monk saw the dead abbot's spirit, he said to him, ‘how goes it with thee, master?‘ to which the spirit of Odilo replied, ‘Very well, oh brother, Christ Himself deigned to come and meet His servant. In the hour of my death He pointed out to me a fierce and terrible figure which, standing in a corner, would have terrified me by its huge monstrosity had not its malignancy been annulled by His presence.’

== Writings ==
Only a few minor writings by Odilo survive:

- a life of the holy Empress Adelaide to whom he was closely related
- a short biography of his predecessor, abbot Mayeul
- sermons on feasts of the ecclesiastical year
- some hymns and prayers
- a few letters from his extensive correspondence.

== Veneration ==
He was buried in Souvigny Priory, where he died, and was soon venerated as a saint.

In 1063 Peter Damien undertook the process of his canonization, and wrote a short life, an abstract from the work of Jotsald, one of Odilo's monks who accompanied him on his travels.

In 1793, his relics, together with those of the previous Abbot Mayeul, were burned by French revolutionaries "on the altar of the fatherland".

The feast of Saint Odilo was formerly 2 January, in Cluny, now it is celebrated on 19 January, and in Switzerland on 6 February. Elsewhere it is on 11 May.

Odilo is patron of the souls in purgatory. The parish of Saint Odilo in Berwyn, Illinois, is officially designated as "The National Shrine of the Souls in Purgatory".

== Attribution ==
Catholic Church titles
Preceded by Maiolus	Abbot of Cluny; 994-1049	Succeeded by Hugh I
