= Hugh of Cluny =

Abbot of Cluny (1024–1109)

Saint Hugh of Cluny
- Hugh of Cluny, Henry IV, Holy Roman Emperor, and Matilda of Tuscany
- Born: 13 May 1024; Semur-en-Brionnais, Brionnais (now Saône-et-Loire), France
- Died: 29 April 1109 (aged 84); Cluny, Brionnais (now Saône-et-Loire), France
- Venerated in: Roman Catholic Church
- Canonized: 6 January 1120 by Pope Callixtus II
- Feast: 29 April
- Patronage: Against fever

Hugh (13 May 1024 – 29 April 1109), sometimes called Hugh the Great or Hugh of Semur, was the Abbot of Cluny from 1049 until his death in 1109. He was one of the most influential leaders of the monastic orders from the Middle Ages.

== Biography ==
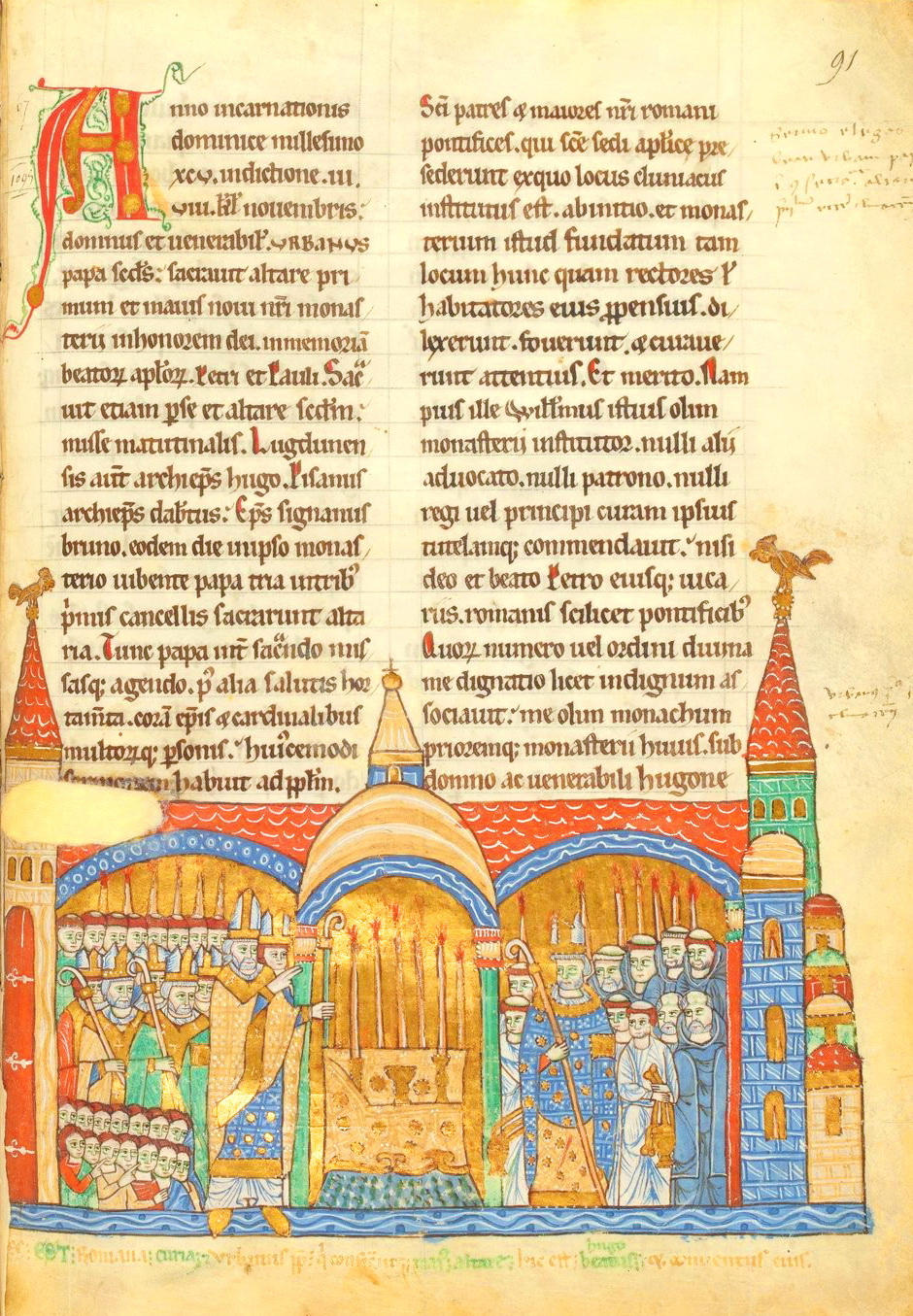
Urban II consecrated the altar of Cluny in the presence of Hugh

Hugh was descended from the noblest families in Burgundy. He was the eldest son of Seigneur Dalmas I of Semur and Aremberge of Vergy, daughter of Henry I, Duke of Burgundy.

His father wanted him to be a knight, but recognizing his evident aversion to that, entrusted him to his grand-uncle Hugh, Bishop of Auxerre, for preparation for the priesthood. Under the protection of this relative, Hugh received his early education at the monastery school attached to the Priory of St. Marcellus.

At the age of fourteen he entered the novitiate at Cluny and at the age of fifteen, took his monastic vows. He later became prior. In 1048 he accompanied the Bishop of Toul, pope-elect Bruno von Egisheim-Dagsburg, to Rome, where he was consecrated Pope Leo IX. The following year Prior Hugh was elected abbot of Cluny, succeeding Odilo. Later in 1049 he attended the Council of Reims, and in 1054, the Council of Tours. In March 1058, he was in Florence, where he attended Pope Stephen IX on his deathbed.

Abbot Hugh built the third abbey church at Cluny, the largest structure in Europe for many centuries, with funds provided by Ferdinand I of León and Henry I of England. In October 1085, Pope Urban II, a former prior of Cluny, consecrated the high altar.

In 1089 he established the Priory of St Pancras, the first Cluniac house in England.

After Clementia of Burgundy was married, she gave Hugh the Flemish monastery of St. Bertin. This act spread the Cluniac order north of the Loire and initiated monastic reform in Flanders.

== Political influence ==
Hugh had close relationships with Ferdinand I and Alfonso VI of León and Castile. His influence on Pope Urban II, who had been prior at Cluny under Hugh, made Hugh one of the most powerful and influential figures of the late 11th century.

As the godfather of the Holy Roman Emperor, Henry IV, he also played a role as a mediator during the conflict between Pope Gregory VII and Henry IV, though he was not successful. Additionally, he was an active diplomat to Germany and Hungary on behalf of the church.

Abbot Hugh died in the Lady Chapel at Cluny on the evening of Easter Monday, 28 April 1109. Many of his relics were pillaged or destroyed by the Huguenots in 1575. His feast day is April 29.

== Sources ==
- Bouchard, Constance Brittain (1987). Sword, Miter, and Cloister: Nobility and Church in Burgundy, 980-1198. Cornell University Press.
- Iogna-Prat, Dominique (2002). Order & Exclusion: Cluny and Christendom Face Heresy, Judaism, and Islam. Cornell University Press.
