= Avermes =

- Commune
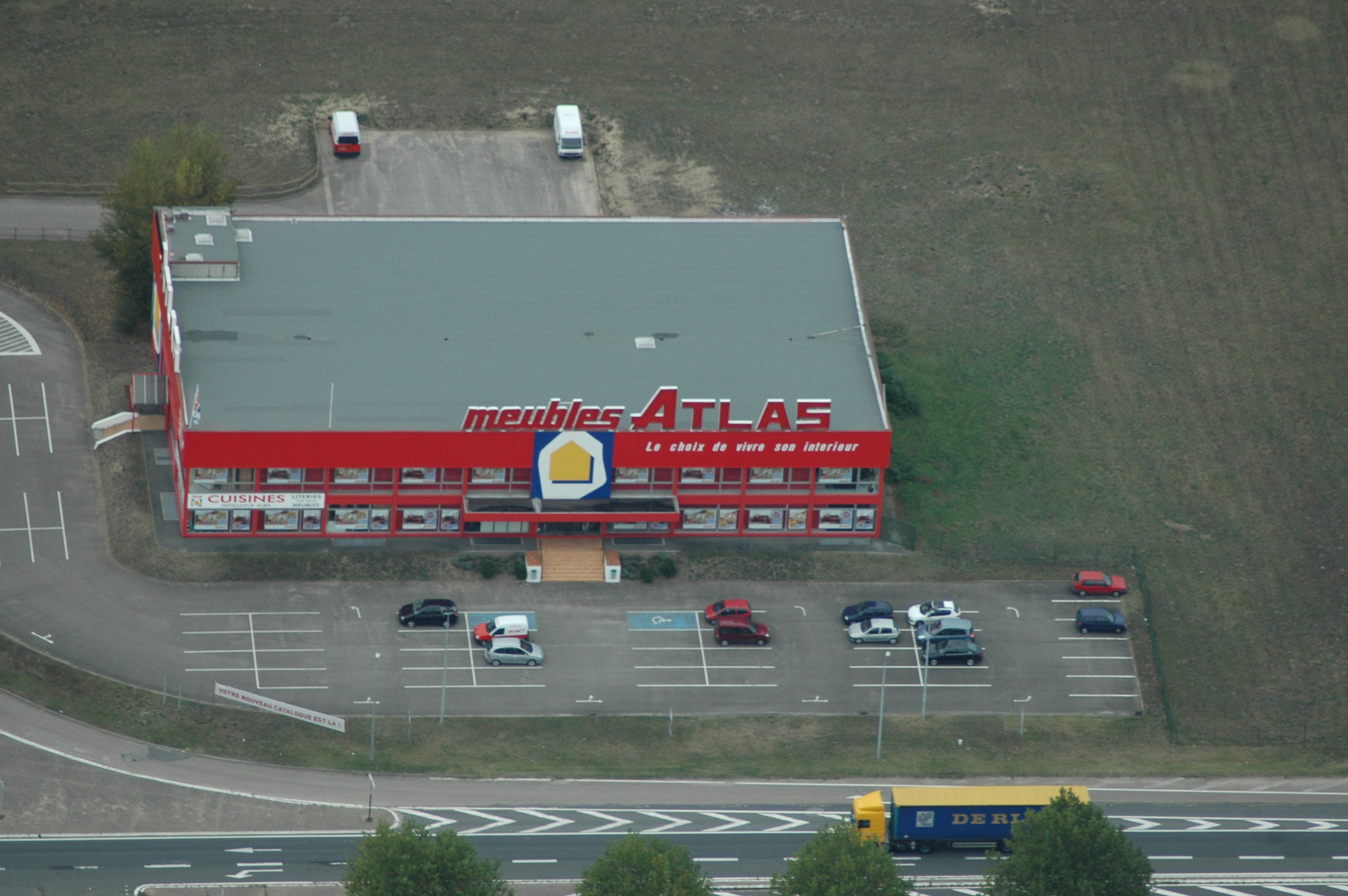
- The Atlas factory

- Coat of arms
- Location of Avermes
- Location within France Location within Auvergne-Rhône-Alpes
- Coordinates: 46°35′19″N 3°18′29″E
- Country: France
- Region: Auvergne-Rhône-Alpes
- Department: Allier
- Arrondissement: Moulins
- Canton: Moulins-1
- Intercommunality: CA Moulins Communauté

Government
  - Mayor (2026–32): Jean-Luc Albouy
- Area^{1}: 15.6 km^{2} (6.0 sq mi)
- Elevation: 220 m (720 ft)
- Highest elevation: 262 m (860 ft)
- Lowest elevation: 199 m (653 ft)
- Population (2023): 4,074
  - Density: 261/km^{2} (676/sq mi)
- Time zone: UTC+01:00 (CET)
  - Summer (DST): UTC+02:00 (CEST)
- INSEE/Postal code: 03013 /03000
- Website: avermes.fr
- ^{1} French Land Register data, which excludes lakes, ponds, glaciers > 1 km^{2} (0.386 sq mi or 247 acres) and river estuaries.

Avermes (French pronunciation: [avɛʁm]) is a commune in the Allier department in the Auvergne-Rhône-Alpes region of central France.

The inhabitants of the commune are known as Avermois or Avermoises.

The commune has been awarded two flowers by the National Council of Towns and Villages in Bloom in the Competition of cities and villages in Bloom.

== Geography ==
Avermes is located in the north-east of Allier department in Sologne Bourbonnaise natural region immediately north-west of Moulins. Access to the commune is by Route nationale N7 which comes from Villeneuve-sur-Allier in the north passing through the heart of the commune, with an exit just north of the town, and continues south-east, bypassing Moulins, to Bessay-sur-Allier in the south. The D707 goes from the exit on the N7 in the commune south through the town urban area continuing to Moulins. The centre of the town is accessed by the D283 which loops through the centre from the D707. The D979A forms the eastern border of the commune as it goes from Moulins north-east to Saint-Ennemond. The D29 branches from the D979A just south of the commune and passes through the east of the commune north to join the D133 east of Aurouër. The D29D links the D979A to the D29 in the east of the commune. Apart from the town there are the districts and hamlets of Chavennes, Les Groiteiers, Ravard, Les Gravettes, Les Plantes, Les Petites-Roches, and L'Etang Chateau. The urban area in the commune spreads along the D707 and along the east bank of the river. The east of the commune is farmland.

The Allier river flows along the western border of the commune and through part of the west of the commune as it flows north to join the Loire just east of Cuffy. An unnamed stream rises in the east of the commune and flows south-west to join the Allier. There are also numerous ponds in the commune.

== History ==
Avermes was mentioned for the first time in the 8th century.

=== Heraldry ===
Arms of Avermes	Blazon: Argent three fesses Sable, a bend the same charged with 3 fesses Argent, surcharged at 1 with a rose Gules seeded and barbed the same, at 2 a mullet Gules of 6 points pierced, at 3 a Celtic Crosslet the same.

== Administration ==
List of Successive Mayors

Mayors from the French Revolution to 1935

From	To	Name	Party	Position
1792	1793	Jean Michel		
1793	1795	Antoine du Broc		
1795	1804	Joseph Perreuil		
1804	1807	Pierre Merle		
1807	1815	Louis du Broc		
1815	1815	Jean-Baptiste Laurent		
1815	1817	Louis du Broc		
1817	1830	Antoine Durocher		
1830	1830	Petitville		
1830	1848	Jean-Baptiste Degrange		
1848	1856	Adolphe Perreul		
1856	1883	Toussaint Bouchard		
1883	1912	Pierre Delvaux		
1912	1919	Gueullet		
1919	1935	Claude Morand		

Mayors from 1935

From	To	Name
1935	1944	Antoine Page
1944	1947	Aumeunier
1948	1974	François Reveret
1974	1977	Jacques de Fremont
1977	1985	Claude Wormser
1985	2002	René Charrette
2002	2023	Alain Denizot
2023	Current	Jean-Luc Albouy

== Population ==
Historical population
Year	Pop.	±% p.a.
1968	2,007	—
1975	2,780	+4.76%
1982	3,286	+2.42%
1990	3,892	+2.14%
1999	3,966	+0.21%
2007	3,827	−0.44%
2012	3,818	−0.05%
2017	3,966	+0.76%
2023	4,074	+0.45%
Source: INSEE

== Economy ==
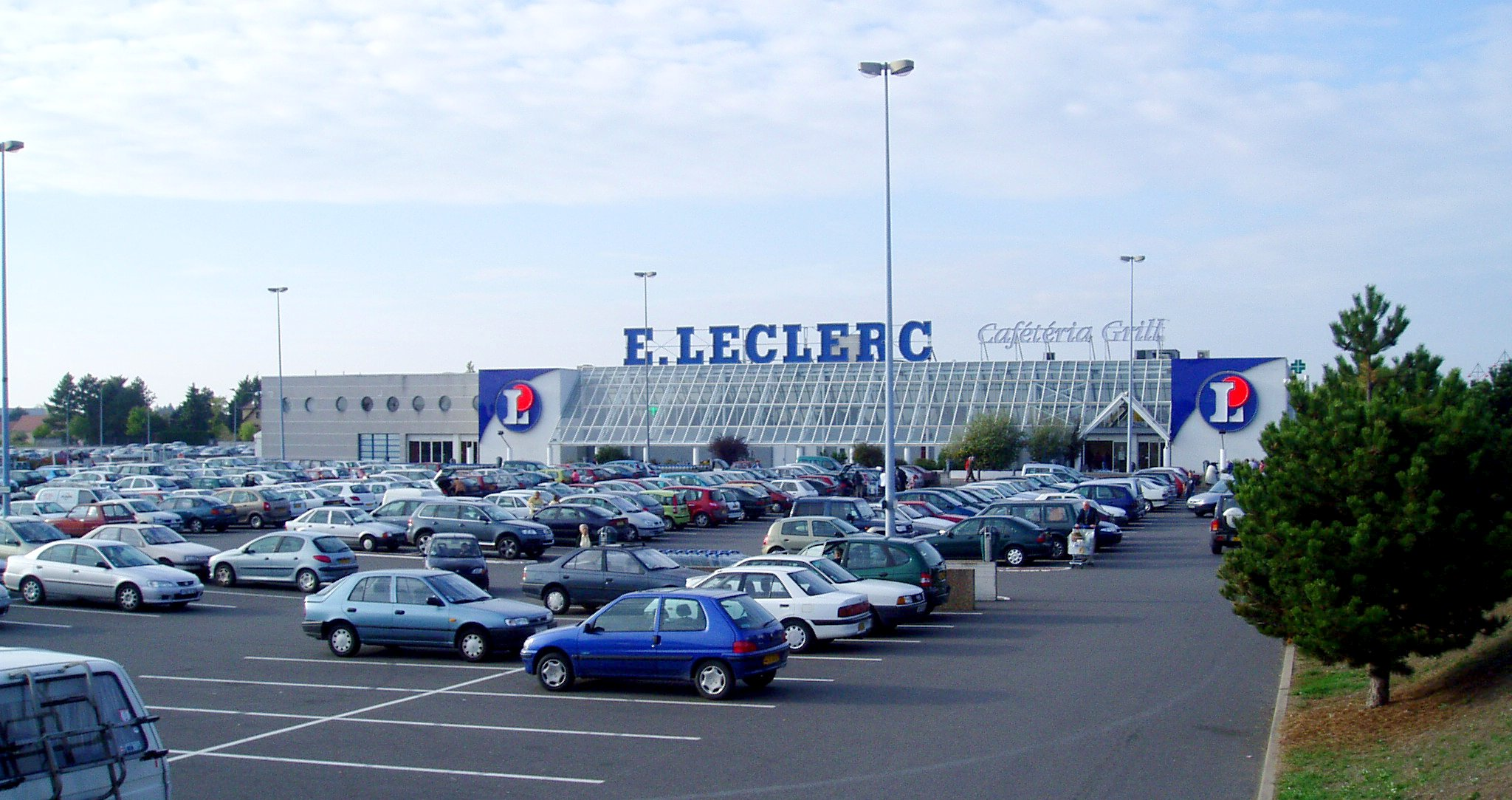
The former E.Leclerc Centre in 2008.

This is the main suburb of Moulins for both leisure and industrial activities with a fairground (Moulins Foirexpo), a cultural multi-purpose hall (Islea), and two metallurgical factories: JPM ex-Chauvat employing about 400 people, and Potain Cranes which employs about 250 people. These are the two largest employers in the commune with ITM (an Intermarché logistics depot with 200 employees), the Leclerc Centre (distribution with 200 employees), Desamais (hardware with 110 employees), and Chapier (DIY store - 50 employees).

== Culture and heritage ==
=== Civil heritage ===
The commune has one building that is registered as an historical monument:

- The Chateau of Segange (15th century)

Other sites of interest

The Home of Champfeu, dating from the 17th and 18th centuries with the large buildings of the old seminary and the large chapel built in his enclosure in 1925 (Route de Paris).

=== Religious heritage ===
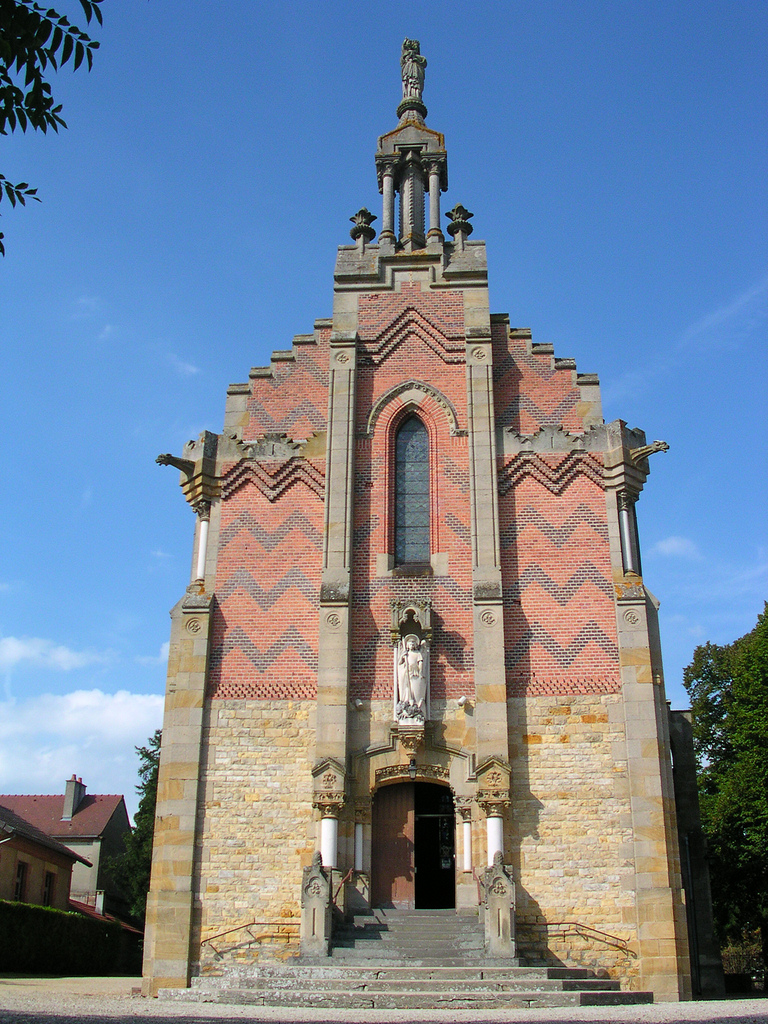
The Church of Saint Michel

The commune has one religious building that is registered as an historical monument:

- The Church of Saint Michel or Notre-Dame de la Salette (1871). The church is built in bi-coloured bricks, grey and light grey (Volvic stone).

== See also ==
- Communes of the Allier department
