= Aurouër =

- Commune
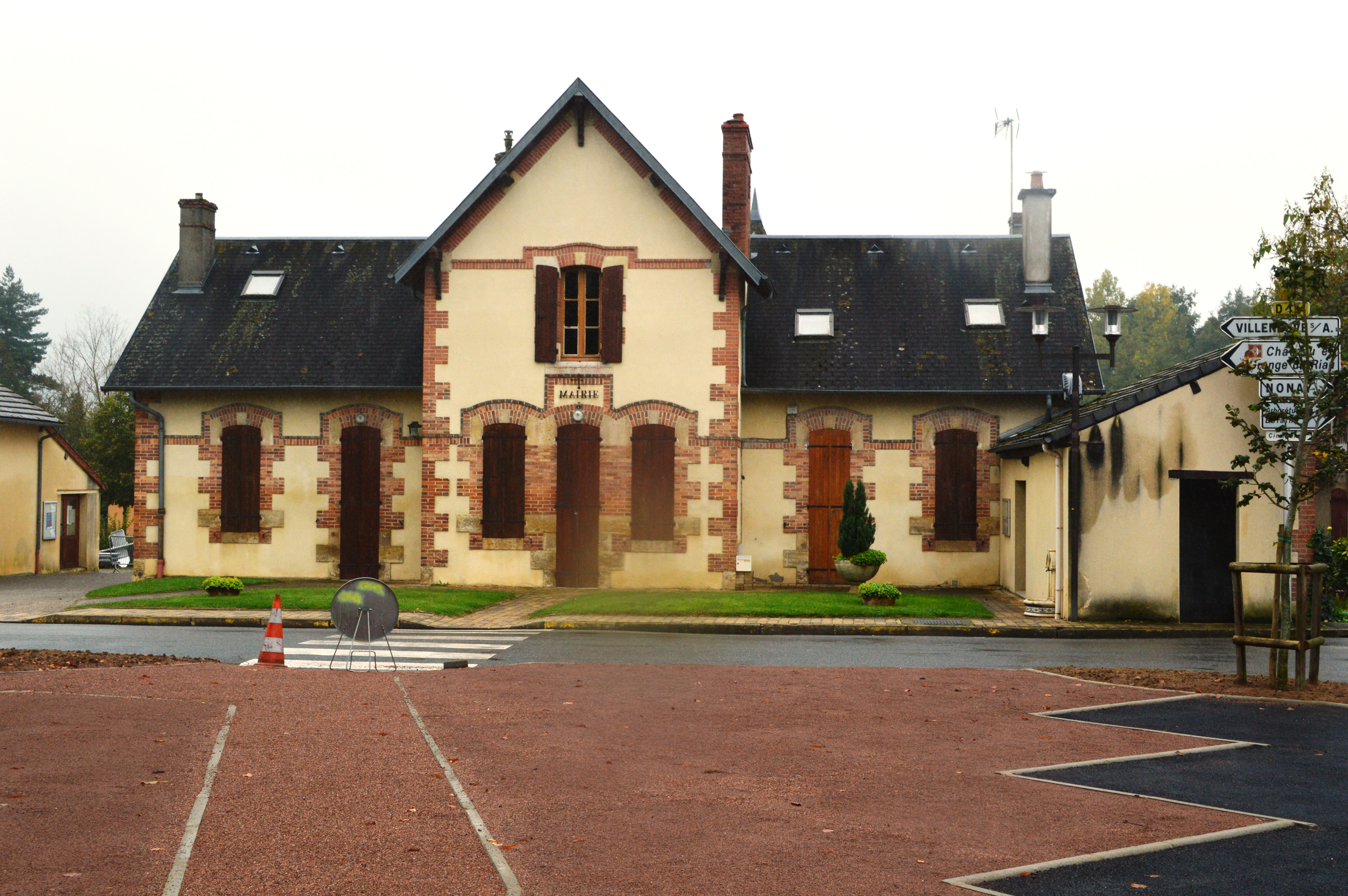
- The town hall in Aurouër
- Location of Aurouër
- Location within France Location within Auvergne-Rhône-Alpes
- Coordinates: 46°41′16″N 3°18′01″E
- Country: France
- Region: Auvergne-Rhône-Alpes
- Department: Allier
- Arrondissement: Moulins
- Canton: Yzeure
- Intercommunality: CA Moulins Communauté

Government
  - Mayor (2026–32): Yves Lenoir
- Area^{1}: 27.06 km^{2} (10.45 sq mi)
- Elevation: 247 m (810 ft)
- Highest elevation: 262 m (860 ft)
- Lowest elevation: 215 m (705 ft)
- Population (2023): 400
  - Density: 15/km^{2} (38/sq mi)
- Time zone: UTC+01:00 (CET)
  - Summer (DST): UTC+02:00 (CEST)
- INSEE/Postal code: 03011 /03460
- ^{1} French Land Register data, which excludes lakes, ponds, glaciers > 1 km^{2} (0.386 sq mi or 247 acres) and river estuaries.

Aurouër is a commune in the Allier department in the Auvergne-Rhône-Alpes region of central France.

The inhabitants of the commune are known as Aurouërois or Aurouëroises.

== Geography ==
Aurouër is located some 15 kilometres (9.3 mi) north by north-east of Moulins and 20 kilometres (12 mi) south-east of Saint-Pierre-le-Moûtier. The whole eastern border of the commune is the departmental boundary between Allier and Nièvre. Access to the commune is by the D133 road from Villeneuve-sur-Allier in the south-west which passes through the commune and the village and continues east to Saint-Ennemond. The D228 goes north-east from the village to Dornes. Apart from the village there are the hamlets of:

- Les Berthomiers
- Le Bois Canot
- Bonnefond
- Les Cantes
- Champfroid
- Le Charlet
- Les Chenes
- Le Choulton
- Le Domaine Chateau
- Domaine Martin
- Les Durands
- Les Forets
- Les Gallets
- Les Gouffats
- Les Grillets
- La Joubarde
- Lafat
- Lardillat
- La Motte
- La Motte-Ponay
- La Niziere
- La Noue
- Le Ponay
- Les Simonets
- Les Torterats
- Vaucoulmin
- Les Vernes

There are large forested areas in the south-east of the commune with most of the rest farmland.

There are many ponds scattered across the commune from which streams flow towards the west to join the Allier.

== Administration ==
List of Successive Mayors

From	To	Name
2001	2024	Alain Borde
2024	Current	Yves Lenoir

== Demography ==
Between 1837 and 1879 Aurouër was part of the commune Villeneuve-sur-Allier.

Historical population

Year	Pop.	±% p.a.
1793	462	—
1800	804	+8.24%
1806	350	−12.94%
1821	455	+1.76%
1831	439	−0.36%
1836	378	−2.95%
1881	497	+0.61%
1886	533	+1.41%
1891	581	+1.74%
1896	575	−0.21%
1901	539	−1.28%
1906	530	−0.34%
1911	507	−0.88%
1921	450	−1.19%
1926	429	−0.95%

Year	Pop.	±% p.a.
1931	425	−0.19%
1936	400	−1.21%
1946	398	−0.05%
1954	385	−0.41%
1962	375	−0.33%
1968	310	−3.12%
1975	310	+0.00%
1982	264	−2.27%
1990	302	+1.70%
1999	319	+0.61%
2007	369	+1.84%
2012	398	+1.52%
2017	413	+0.74%
2023	400	−0.53%

Source: EHESS and INSEE

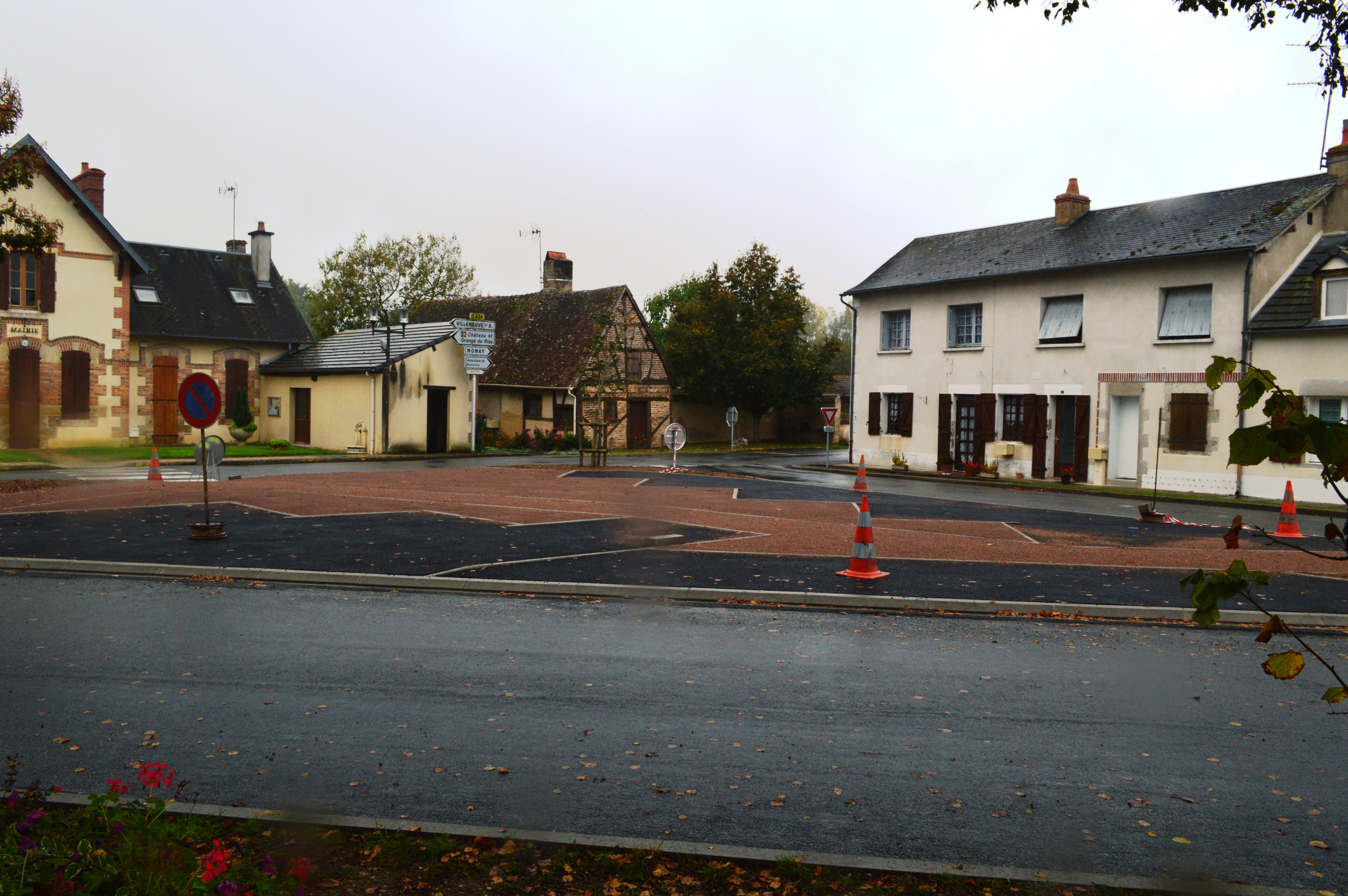
Aurouër Town Square

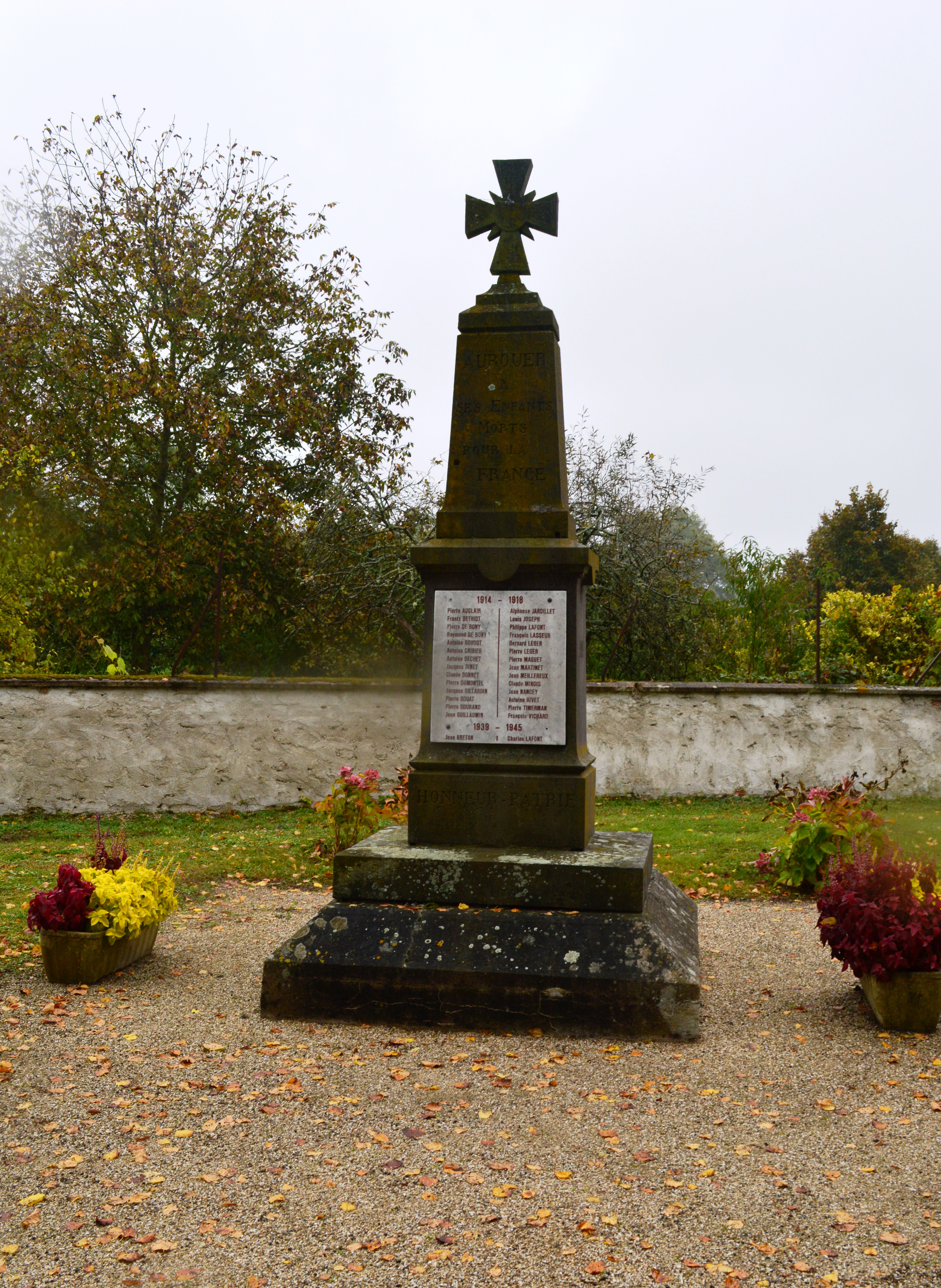
Aurouër War Memorial

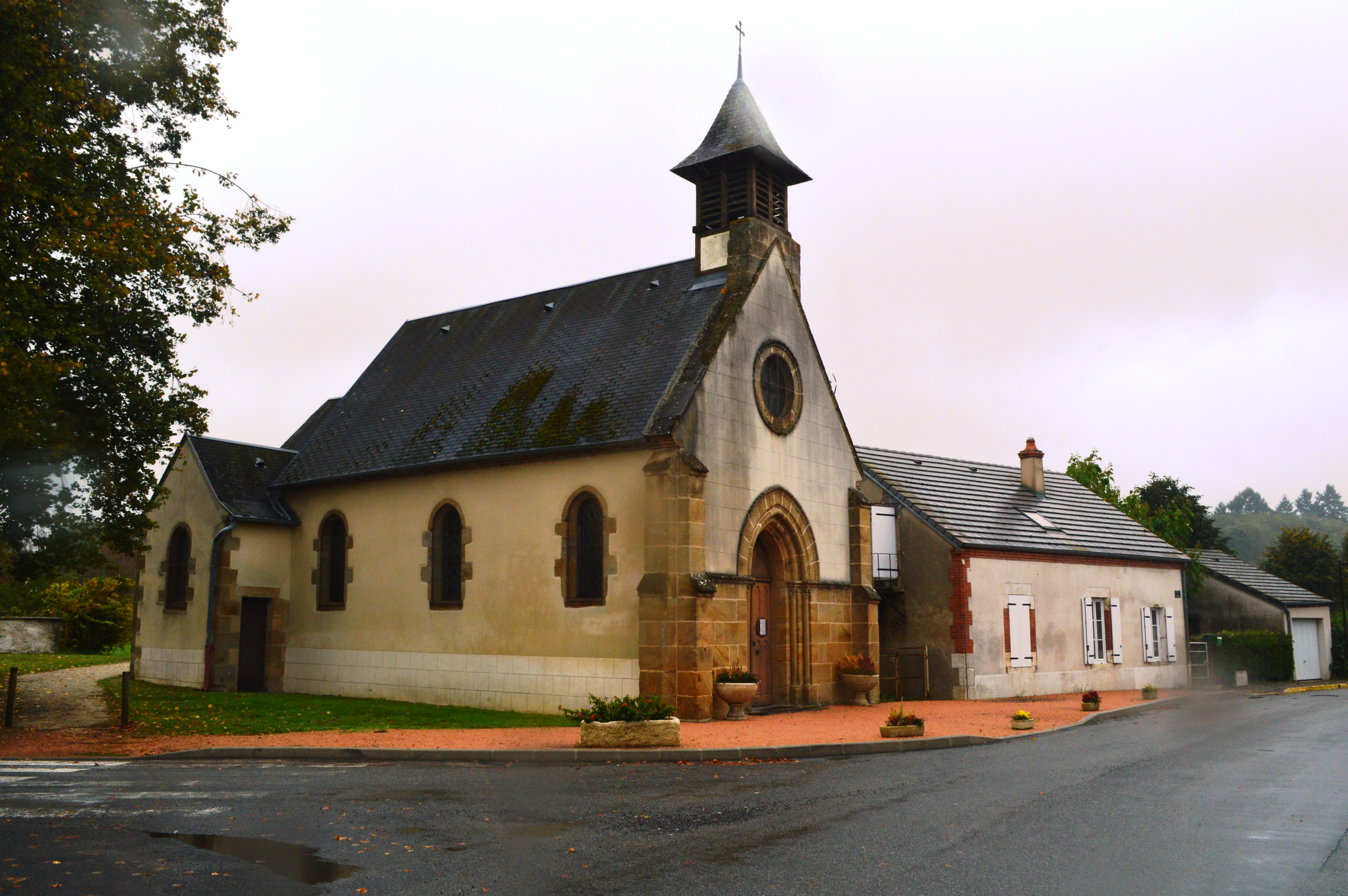
Aurouër Church

== See also ==
- Communes of the Allier department
