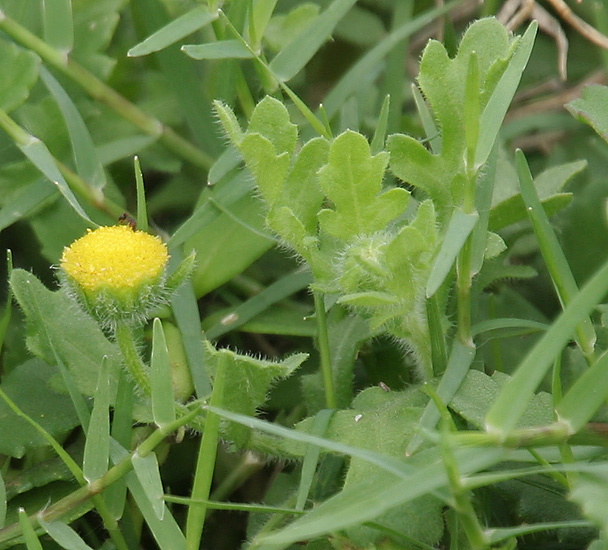
- Grangea maderaspatana at Pocharam lake, Andhra Pradesh, India

Scientific classification
- Kingdom: Plantae
- Clade: Tracheophytes
- Clade: Angiosperms
- Clade: Eudicots
- Clade: Asterids
- Order: Asterales
- Family: Asteraceae
- Subfamily: Asteroideae
- Tribe: Astereae
- Subtribe: Grangeinae
- Genus: Grangea; Adans.

Synonyms
- Pyrarda Cass.; Microtrichia DC.

= Grangea =

Genus of flowering plants

Grangea is a genus of flowering plants in the family Asteraceae.

Species

- Grangea anthemoides O.Hoffm. - Angola, Botswana, Zambia, Namibia
- Grangea ceruanoides Cass. - Sahel region from Mauritania to Sudan
- Grangea gossypina (Baker) Fayed - Madagascar
- Grangea jeffreyana Fayed - Burundi
- Grangea lyrata (DC.) Fayed - Madagascar
- Grangea madagascariensis Vatke - Madagascar
- Grangea maderaspatana (L.) Poir. - widespread in Africa and tropical Asia
- Grangea zambesiaca Fayed - Zambia
