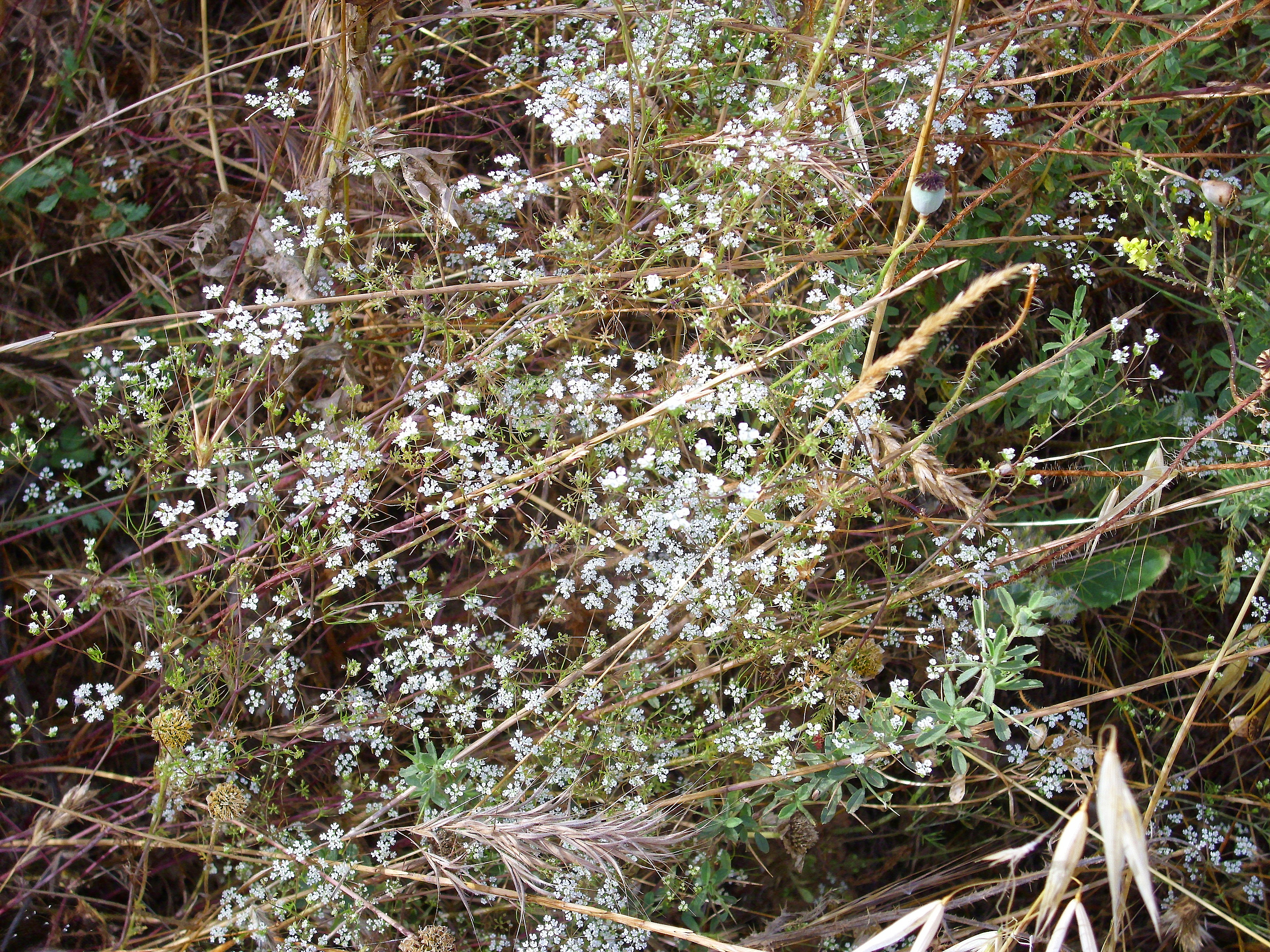

Scientific classification
- Kingdom: Plantae
- Clade: Tracheophytes
- Clade: Angiosperms
- Clade: Eudicots
- Clade: Asterids
- Order: Apiales
- Family: Apiaceae
- Subfamily: Apioideae
- Tribe: Pyramidoptereae
- Genus: Ammoides; Adans.

Species
- Ammoides pusilla; Ammoides verticillata

= Ammoides =

Genus of flowering plants

Ammoides is a genus of flowering plants in the Apiaceae, comprising 2 species. It is endemic to northern Africa and southern Europe.
