= Aglaé Adanson =

French horticulturalist and writer (1775–1852)

Aglaé Catherine Adanson
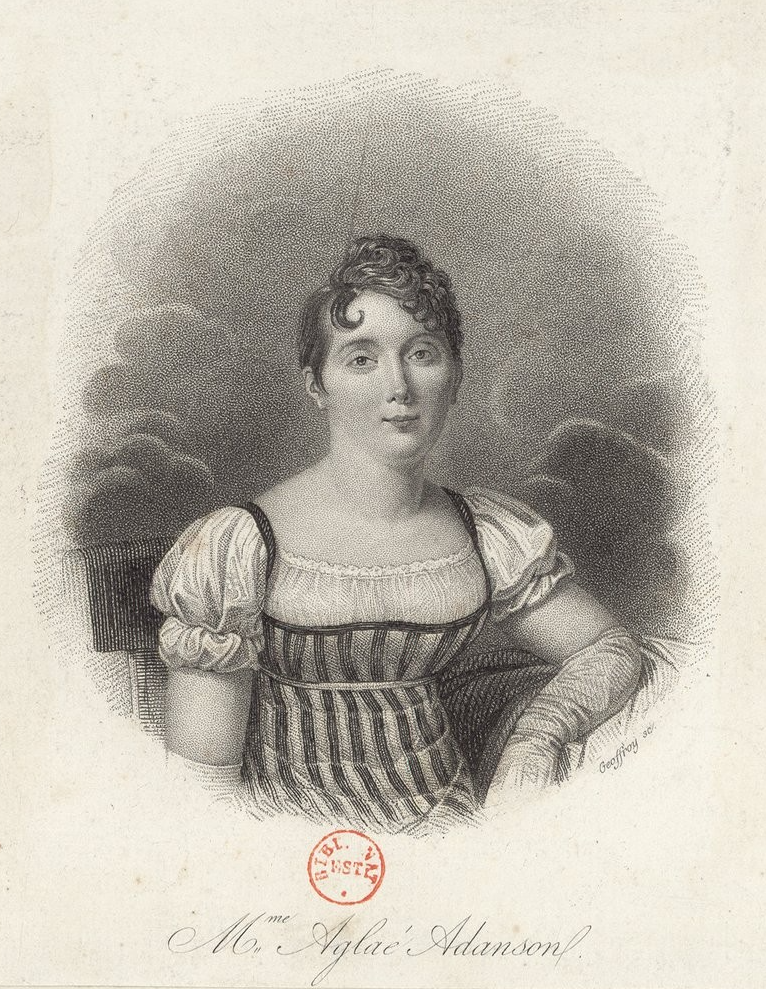
- Born: 27 May 1775; Paris, France
- Died: 25 March 1852 (aged 76); Villeneuve-sur-Allier, France
- Burial place: Chapel of Balaine Castle
- Occupations: Horticulturalist and writer
- Known for: Balaine Arboretum
- Spouse(s): 1. Joseph-Eugénie-Louis Margot de Lespinasse; 2. Jean-Baptiste Doumet
- Children: 3
- Father: Michel Adanson

Aglaé Adanson (1775–1852) was a French horticulturist, writer and creator of the Balaine Arboretum. She was the author of numerous works on gardening, rural life and home economics. She was a founding member of the Horticultural Society of Paris.

== Biography ==
=== Family and education ===
Aglaé Catherine Adanson was born on 27 May 1775 in Paris, the only daughter of a renowned naturalist, Michel Adanson, and his wife Jeanne Bénard. With her father she went on plant hunting expeditions and felt free to "cultivate her wild tastes."

Her parents separated in 1784. Aglaé and her mother then went to live in the townhouse of Jeanne's patron, Antoine Robert Nazaire Girard de Busson, a landowner in Paris and in Tresnay. At the age of 10, Aglaé was sent to boarding school at the Convent of the Ladies of Calvary in Paris, near the Luxembourg Gardens, where she would visit with her father once a month. She received a proper classical education: she learned to read Latin and Greek authors and she attended philosophy and drawing classes.

=== Marriages and family life ===
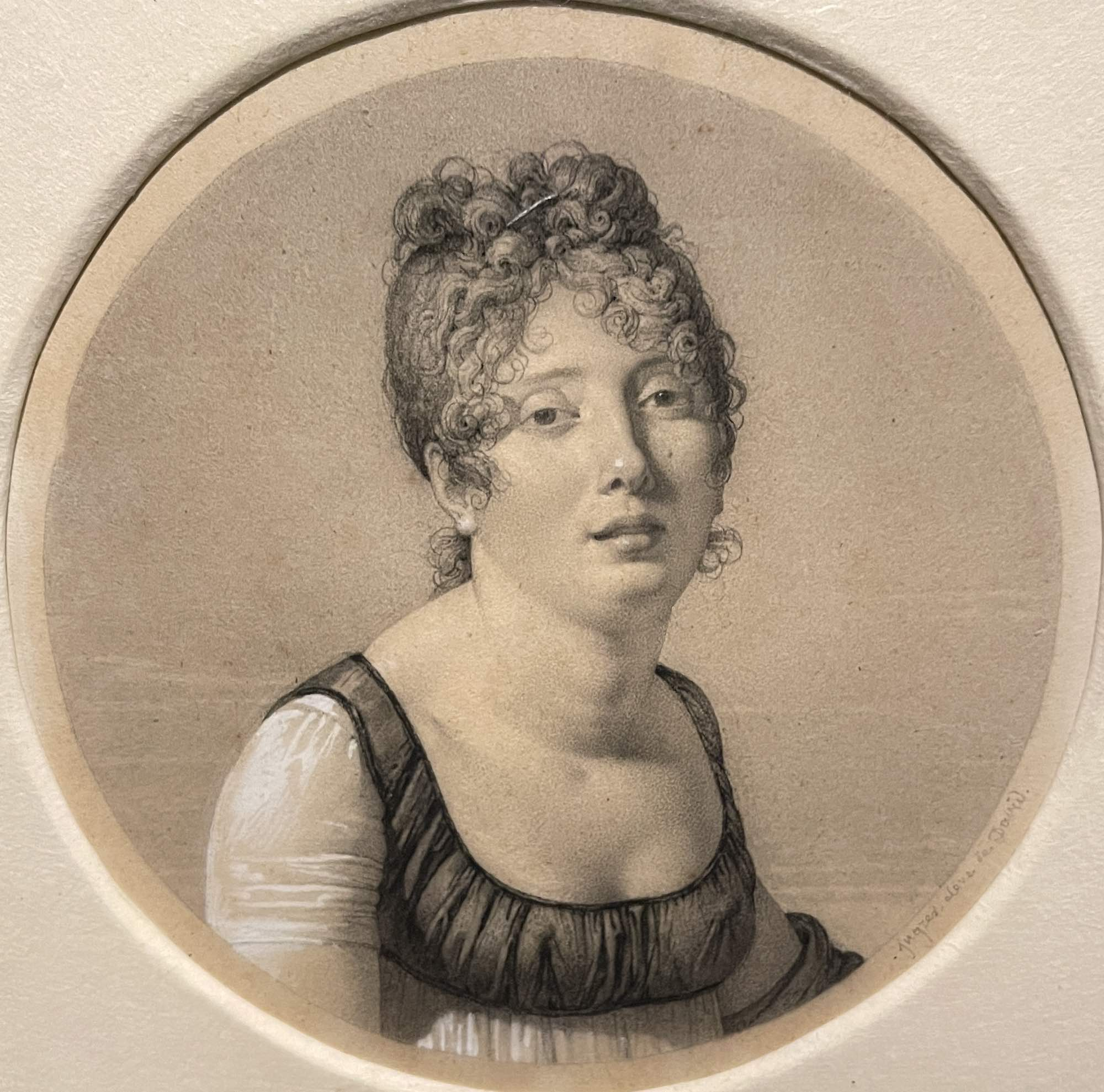
Aglaé Adanson drawn by Ingres, circa 1802–1803.

In 1791, she undertook an English language course in London and admired the gardens there. Upon her return in 1792, she married Joseph-Eugénie-Louis Margot de Lespinasse, a former officer in King Louis XVI's dragoons. Her husband was violent and the marriage was unhappy; they divorced in 1794. In 1796, she married Jean-Baptiste Doumet, with whom she had two children: Émile-Auguste Doumet, an officer and deputy for the Hérault department (from whom the heirs of the Balaine estate are descended), and Anacharsis (1801–1880), a general councilor for the Nièvre department and president of the Horticultural Society of the Allier. She divorced Doumet after her second son was born and then lived with Pierre Hubert Descotils, an architect, with whom she had a son, Pierre-Anthenor (1809–1857).

=== Creator of the Balaine Arboretum ===
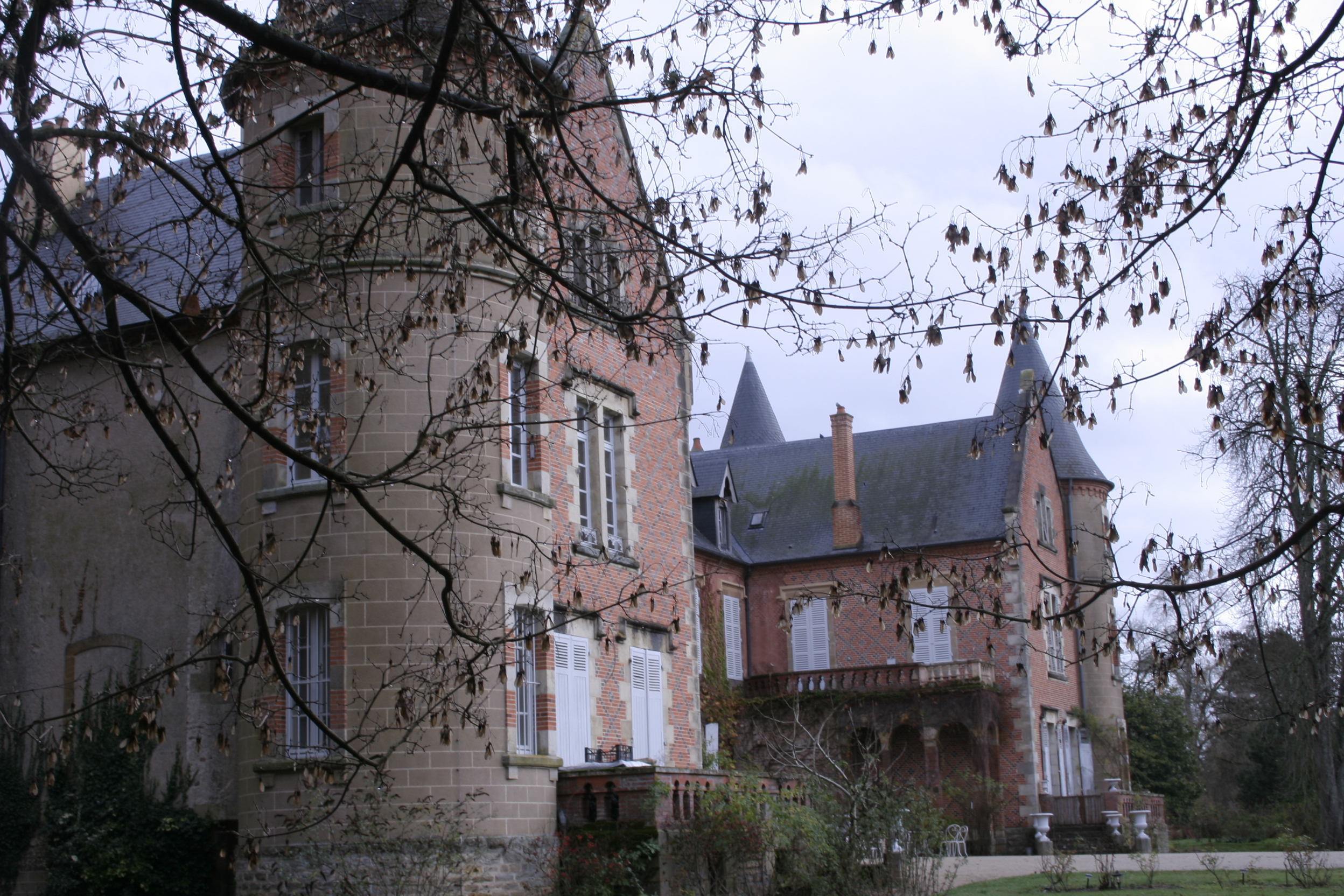
Balaine Castle

In 1804, Girard de Busson (her mother's companion) acquired the Balaine estate in Villeneuve-sur-Allier and gifted it to Aglaé. At that time, it was a large estate of 500 hectares, but the soil was poor and the château was dilapidated château.

She was deeply influenced by the English landscape, and began planning an experimental garden at Balaine. Starting in 1805, she redeveloped the 500 hectares that had been left abandoned and she went on to build a park, gardens and a château called Balaine Castle. Thanks to her extensive knowledge of horticulture, she successfully acclimatized nyssa, sweetgum and bald cypress trees, which were new species at that time. The Balaine Arboretum became the first botanical park in France dedicated to tropical species. She designed the paths and flowerbeds and developed an orchard. She recorded her work in notebooks that would serve as the basis for her future publications.

=== Writer ===
Adanson's writings became the inspiration for her first published book, La maison de campagne (The Country House), published in 1822 by the publisher Audot. Initially published by subscription, it was eventually issued in five editions (in 1825, 1830, 1836, 1845, and 1852). It was the first book on home economics written by a woman, and it offered advice on a wide variety of subjects: cooking, household management, first aid, domesticity, horticulture, etc. A celebration of country life, this work was supplemented in its second edition by Pensées fugitives (Fleeting Thoughts) addressed to her female readers, covering marriage, friendship, running a household and raising children in the countryside.

Adanson maintained a correspondence with botanist Urbain Audibert and Avignon naturalist Esprit Requien, who took note of her "scientific approach."

=== Last years ===
Until her last days, she worked on the sixth edition of her book. Aglaé Adanson died on 25 March 1852, in Villeneuve-sur-Allier. She was buried in the chapel of Balaine Castle. The botanical park she created is still managed and maintained by her offspring, having remained in the Adanson family for seven generations. The current owner of the Baleine Arboretum is one of those descendants, Louise Courteix Adanson.

== Selected works ==
- The Country House (3 volumes), Paris, Audot, 1822 (BNF 30003481).
- Catalogue of trees, shrubs, bushes and perennial plants, cultivated in open ground at Baleine, near Moulins, department of Allier, Paris, Audot, 1825 (BNF 30003479).
- Thoughts and fleeting pieces on various subjects. Collection dedicated by Mrs. Aglaé Adanson to the readers of "La Maison de campagne", Paris, Audot, 1845 (BNF 30003488).
- Children's Book from the Countryside, Moulins, P. A. Desrosiers, 1852 (BNF 30003480).

== Honors and distinctions ==
- Received the gold medal from the Royal and Central Society of Agriculture for her work (1824)
- Founding member of the Paris Society of Horticulture and Practical Agronomy (1827)
- Honorary member of the Lille Horticultural Society
- Member of the Montpellier Agricultural Society
- Namesake of a street in Montpellier, France
