= Louise Courteix Adanson =

French businesswoman (born 1950)

Louise Courteix Adanson (born 1950) is the owner and director of France's oldest private botanical park and national historical monument, Arboretum de Balaine in Villeneuve-sur-Allier. She is a direct descendant of the park's creator Aglaé Adanson. The English-style park was created in 1805 and has been managed and maintained by seven generations of Aglaé's descendants. It is the largest privately owned park in France and is known for its several unique species.

== Biography ==
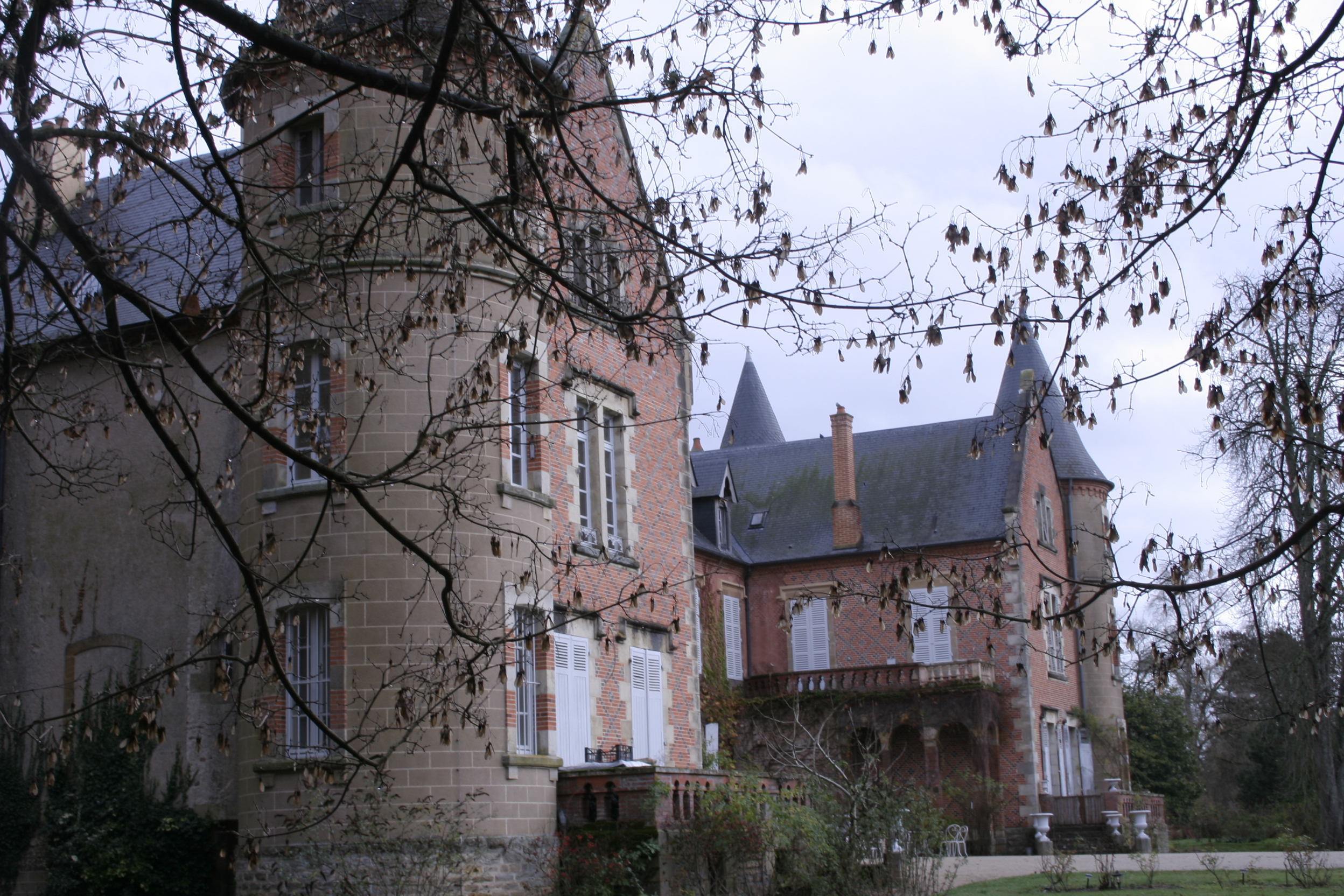
Balaine Castle

Louise Courteix Adanson, owns and manages the estate and arboretum, which opened to the public in 1971. Courteix-Adanson is the great-great-granddaughter of the park's creator Aglaé Adanson, whose father was the renowned botanist and naturalist Michel Adanson. The entire site is 500 hectares and includes a park, gardens and a château called Balaine Castle. The Arboretum was founded in 1805 and was classified as a national historical monument in 1993.

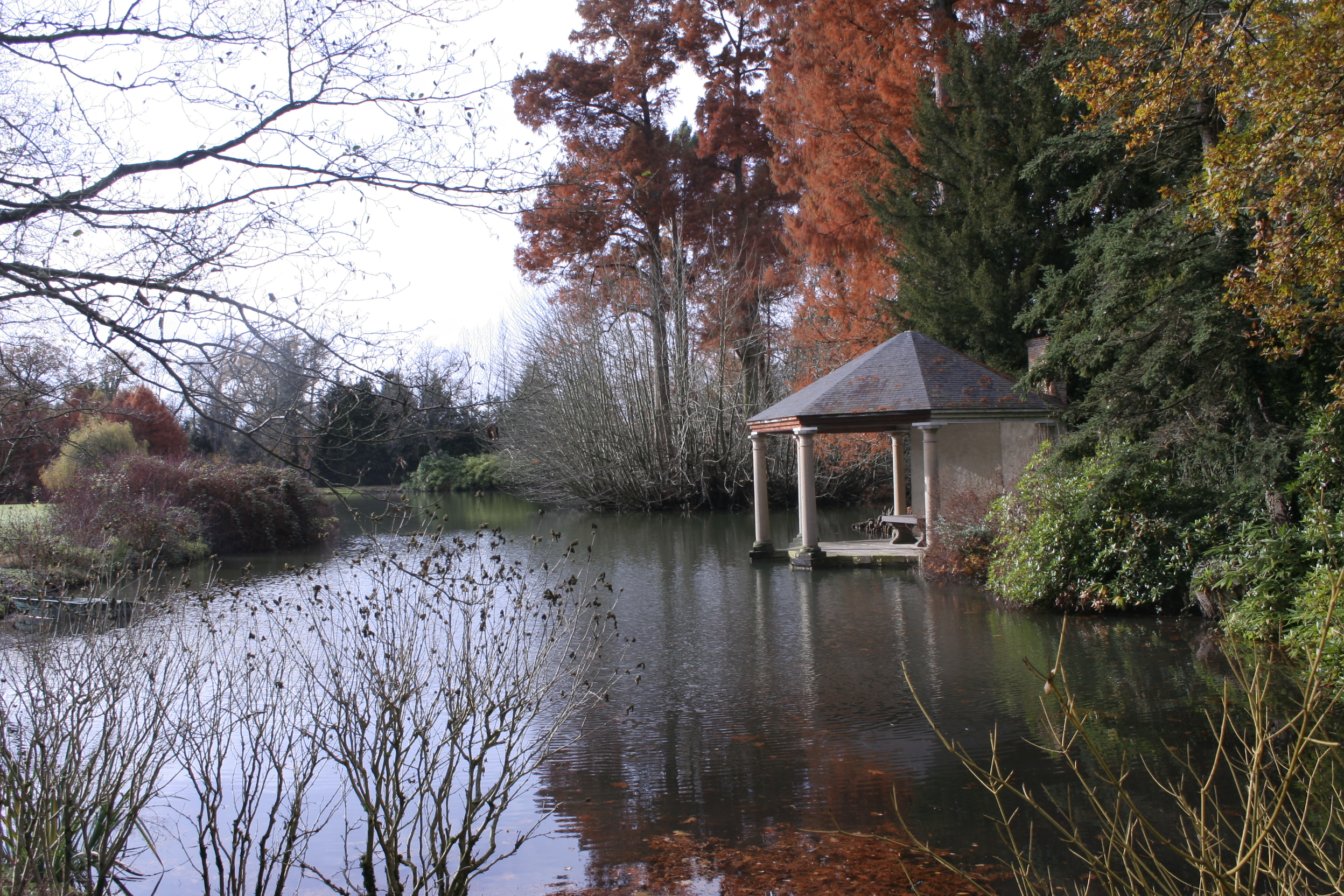

Courteix-Adanson lives on the estate and has her "favorite plants: magnolias, Japanese maples, hydrangeas, roses... and above all, the sassafras, a North American tree with polymorphic leaves that change color in the fall." She is a gardener and works alongside her employees on the grounds. As chief administrator, she performs the management functions.

In 2013, the park had a catastrophic financial season when bad weather caused visitors to stay away, said Courteix Adanson: "Because of disastrously rainy weather, particularly in the spring, we only recorded 8,000 visitors for the year, instead of the usual 12,000. We saw 2,000 fewer visitors just on the two days of our Plant Festival, which is usually a major event for us. In concrete terms, 2,000 fewer visitors means €16,000 that isn't coming in." The following year, the Arboretum fell temporarily into judicial reorganization proceedings and became subject to receivership proceedings, resulting in two employees being laid off.

=== Association creation ===
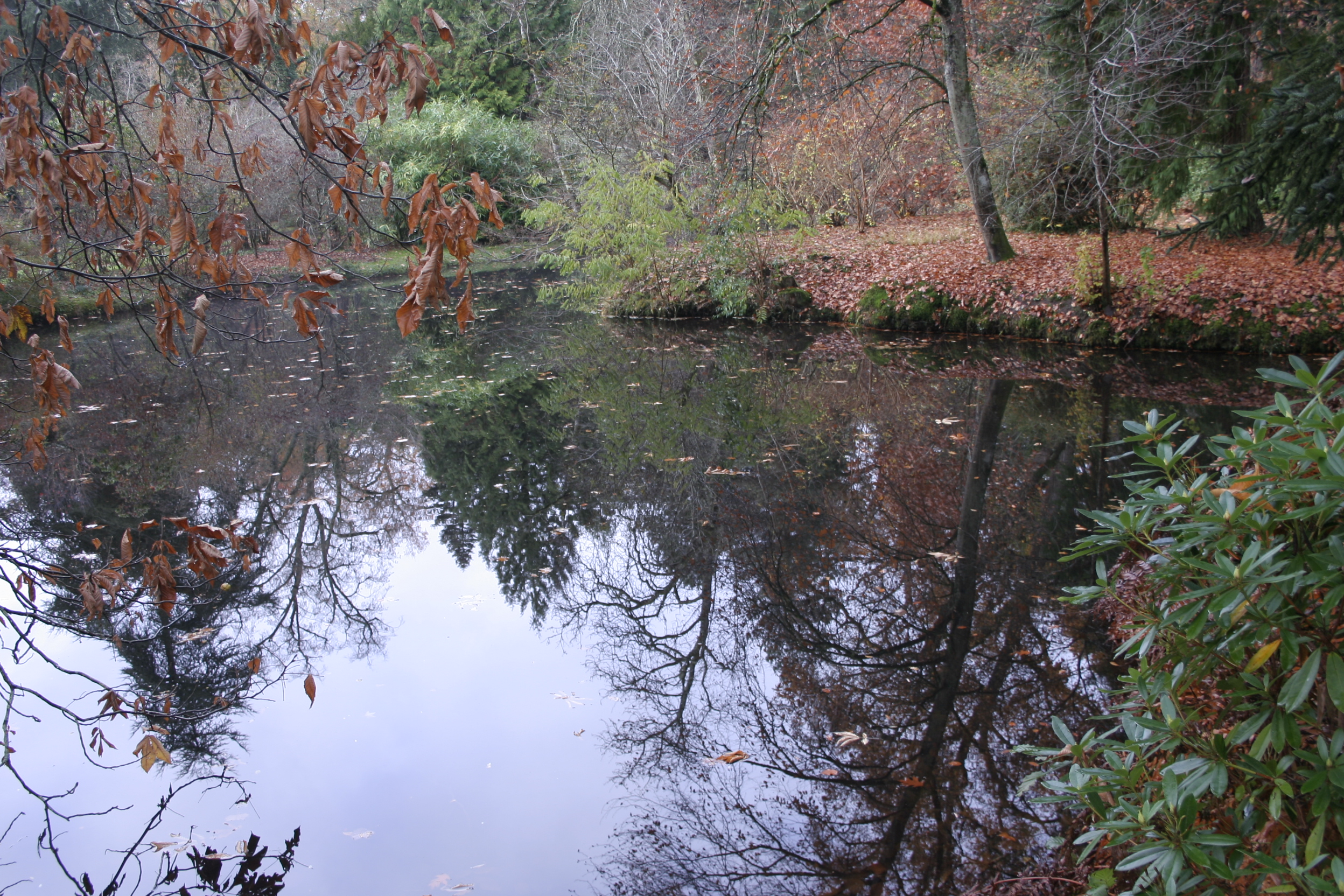
View of the park

In 2018, she created an association to support the Balaine Arboretum. The group is headed by Courteix Adanson, president, her daughter Diane Raggatt, treasurer, and Candice Lauvergeon as secretary.

In 2023, the Arboretum continued to welcome visitors, according to Reymond,

"Sheltered from the winds by Oriental spruces, the arboretum boasts azaleas, camellias, araucarias, yellow cypresses, and one of the oldest known Persian ironwood trees in Europe. Dotted with ponds, France's oldest private arboretum is romantic and full of surprises, such as the birch huts, one of which houses a 19th-century garden shower designed by Aglaé. 'While the garden itself has changed little,' explain Louise and her daughter Diane, 'we've had to adapt to climate change. We lost many conifers due to the drop in the water table. To replace them, we've favored Mediterranean plants.' Classified as a historical monument in 1993, this poetic garden pays homage to its creator, who lent her name to a pear and a rosebush."

According to the Arboretums of France in 2023, "the 20 hectare site is home to 3,500 species and varieties of plants, including a nationally recognized collection of Nyssa trees and an impressive number of specimens over 200 years old."

== Selected awards ==
- 2023 Merit Award by the Arboretums de France
