= Yzeure =

- Commune
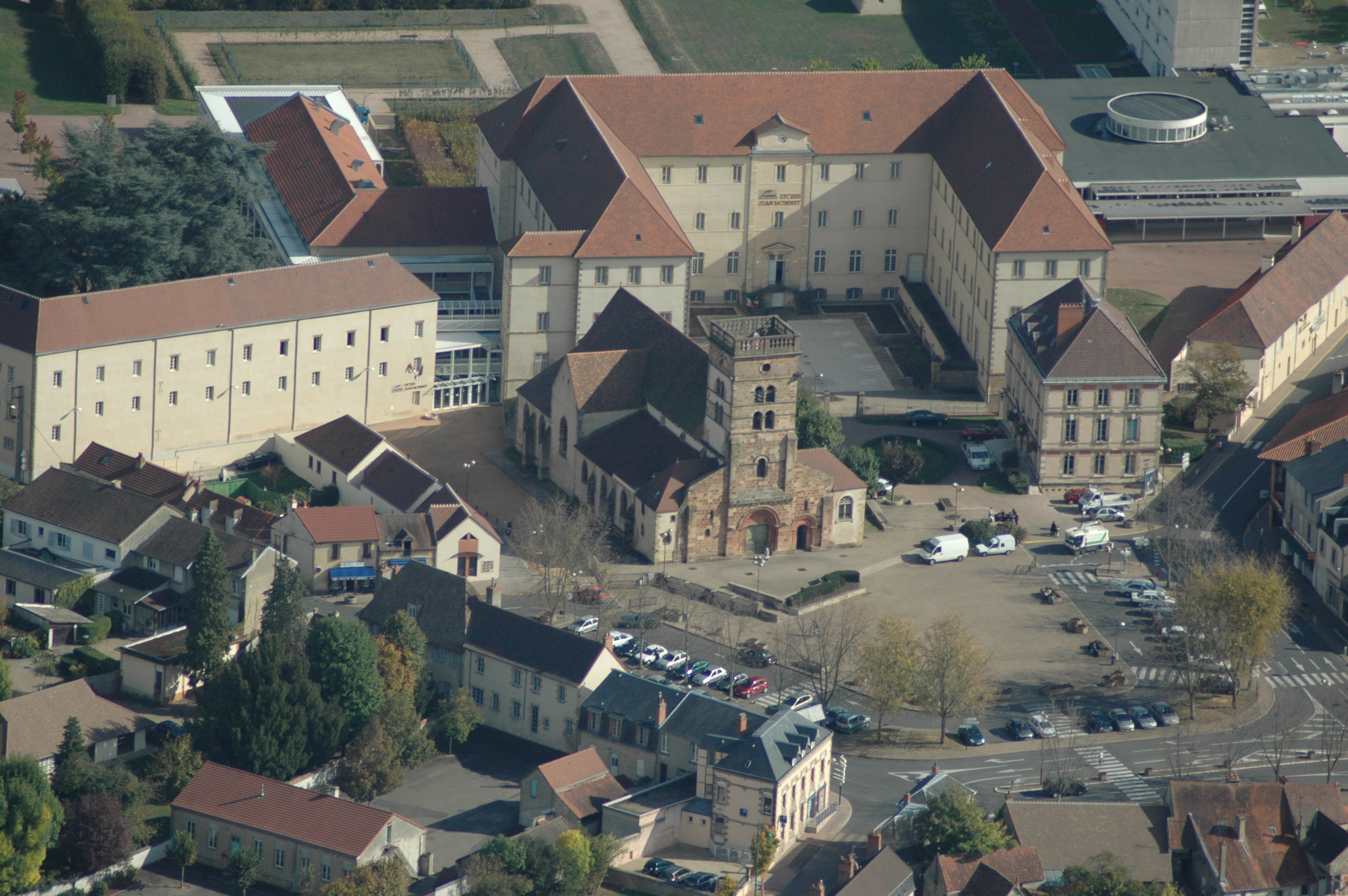
- Aerial view of the church and surroundings

- Coat of arms
- Location of Yzeure
- Location within France Location within Auvergne-Rhône-Alpes
- Coordinates: 46°34′01″N 3°21′19″E
- Country: France
- Region: Auvergne-Rhône-Alpes
- Department: Allier
- Arrondissement: Moulins
- Canton: Yzeure
- Intercommunality: CA Moulins Communauté

Government
  - Mayor (2026–32): Dominique Ray
- Area^{1}: 43.24 km^{2} (16.70 sq mi)
- Elevation: 239 m (784 ft)
- Highest elevation: 278 m (912 ft)
- Lowest elevation: 217 m (712 ft)
- Population (2023): 12,897
  - Density: 298.3/km^{2} (772.5/sq mi)
- Demonym(s): Yzeuriens, Yzeuriennes
- Time zone: UTC+01:00 (CET)
  - Summer (DST): UTC+02:00 (CEST)
- INSEE/Postal code: 03321 /03400
- ^{1} French Land Register data, which excludes lakes, ponds, glaciers > 1 km^{2} (0.386 sq mi or 247 acres) and river estuaries.

Yzeure (French pronunciation: [izœʁ]) is a commune in the department of Allier in the Auvergne-Rhône-Alpes region of central France.

== Location ==
The commune is located in the north of the Allier department. It is the fifth most populated commune in the Allier department, according to the 2021 census. It borders the commune of Moulins to the west and southwest.

By roads, Nevers is 57 km to the north, Bourges is 100 km to the northwest, Clermont-Ferrand is 106 km to the south-southwest, Mâcon is 133 km to the east, Beaune is 145 km to the northeast, Auxerre is 157 km away, and Lyon is 188 km to the southeast.

== Population ==
Historical population

Year	Pop.	±% p.a.
1793	964	—
1800	2,803	+16.47%
1806	1,322	−11.77%
1821	1,642	+1.46%
1831	1,886	+1.40%
1836	2,060	+1.78%
1841	2,475	+3.74%
1846	2,610	+1.07%
1851	2,988	+2.74%
1856	3,240	+1.63%
1861	3,291	+0.31%
1866	3,585	+1.73%
1872	3,850	+1.20%
1876	4,195	+2.17%
1881	4,164	−0.15%
1886	4,464	+1.40%
1891	5,289	+3.45%
1896	5,703	+1.52%
1901	5,960	+0.89%

Year	Pop.	±% p.a.
1906	6,133	+0.57%
1911	6,539	+1.29%
1921	6,084	−0.72%
1926	6,237	+0.50%
1931	7,035	+2.44%
1936	7,573	+1.48%
1946	8,186	+0.78%
1954	8,374	+0.28%
1962	10,000	+2.24%
1968	11,665	+2.60%
1975	13,715	+2.34%
1982	13,197	−0.55%
1990	13,461	+0.25%
1999	12,696	−0.65%
2007	12,470	−0.22%
2012	12,975	+0.80%
2017	13,088	+0.17%
2023	12,897	−0.24%

Source: EHESS (1793–1999) and INSEE

== Climate ==
On average, Yzeure experiences 59.8 days per year with a minimum temperature below 0 °C (32.0 °F), 1.3 days per year with a minimum temperature below −10 °C (14.0 °F), 6.0 days per year with a maximum temperature below 0 °C (32.0 °F), and 24.9 days per year with a maximum temperature above 30 °C (86.0 °F). The record high temperature was 43.2 °C (109.8 °F) on July 25, 2019, while the record low temperature was −21.0 °C (−5.8 °F) on January 9, 1985.

Climate data for Yzeure (1991–2020 normals, extremes 1959–present)
Month	Jan	Feb	Mar	Apr	May	Jun	Jul	Aug	Sep	Oct	Nov	Dec	Year
Record high °C (°F)	18.2 (64.8)	25.8 (78.4)	26.0 (78.8)	29.6 (85.3)	34.9 (94.8)	41.5 (106.7)	43.2 (109.8)	42.0 (107.6)	36.1 (97.0)	31.9 (89.4)	23.6 (74.5)	19.0 (66.2)	43.2 (109.8)
Mean daily maximum °C (°F)	7.1 (44.8)	8.6 (47.5)	13.2 (55.8)	16.8 (62.2)	20.6 (69.1)	24.6 (76.3)	27.0 (80.6)	27.1 (80.8)	22.4 (72.3)	17.0 (62.6)	11.0 (51.8)	7.6 (45.7)	16.9 (62.5)
Daily mean °C (°F)	3.9 (39.0)	4.6 (40.3)	8.0 (46.4)	10.9 (51.6)	14.7 (58.5)	18.5 (65.3)	20.6 (69.1)	20.5 (68.9)	16.3 (61.3)	12.4 (54.3)	7.4 (45.3)	4.5 (40.1)	11.9 (53.3)
Mean daily minimum °C (°F)	0.8 (33.4)	0.6 (33.1)	2.7 (36.9)	4.9 (40.8)	8.9 (48.0)	12.4 (54.3)	14.2 (57.6)	13.9 (57.0)	10.2 (50.4)	7.8 (46.0)	3.8 (38.8)	1.3 (34.3)	6.8 (44.2)
Record low °C (°F)	−21.0 (−5.8)	−19.0 (−2.2)	−12.0 (10.4)	−5.3 (22.5)	−1.2 (29.8)	2.2 (36.0)	5.0 (41.0)	3.0 (37.4)	−0.9 (30.4)	−6.8 (19.8)	−9.0 (15.8)	−15.2 (4.6)	−21.0 (−5.8)
Average precipitation mm (inches)	60.1 (2.37)	49.5 (1.95)	51.9 (2.04)	64.9 (2.56)	81.1 (3.19)	70.8 (2.79)	67.6 (2.66)	63.5 (2.50)	67.6 (2.66)	70.6 (2.78)	83.0 (3.27)	65.1 (2.56)	795.7 (31.33)
Average precipitation days (≥ 1.0 mm)	12.0	10.2	9.7	10.6	11.3	8.8	7.9	7.9	8.3	11.1	13.0	12.6	123.4
Source: Meteociel

== Twin towns – sister cities ==
Yzeure is twinned with:

- Bendorf, Germany
- Gherla, Romania
- Kafountine, Senegal

== See also ==
- Communes of the Allier department
- AS Yzeure
