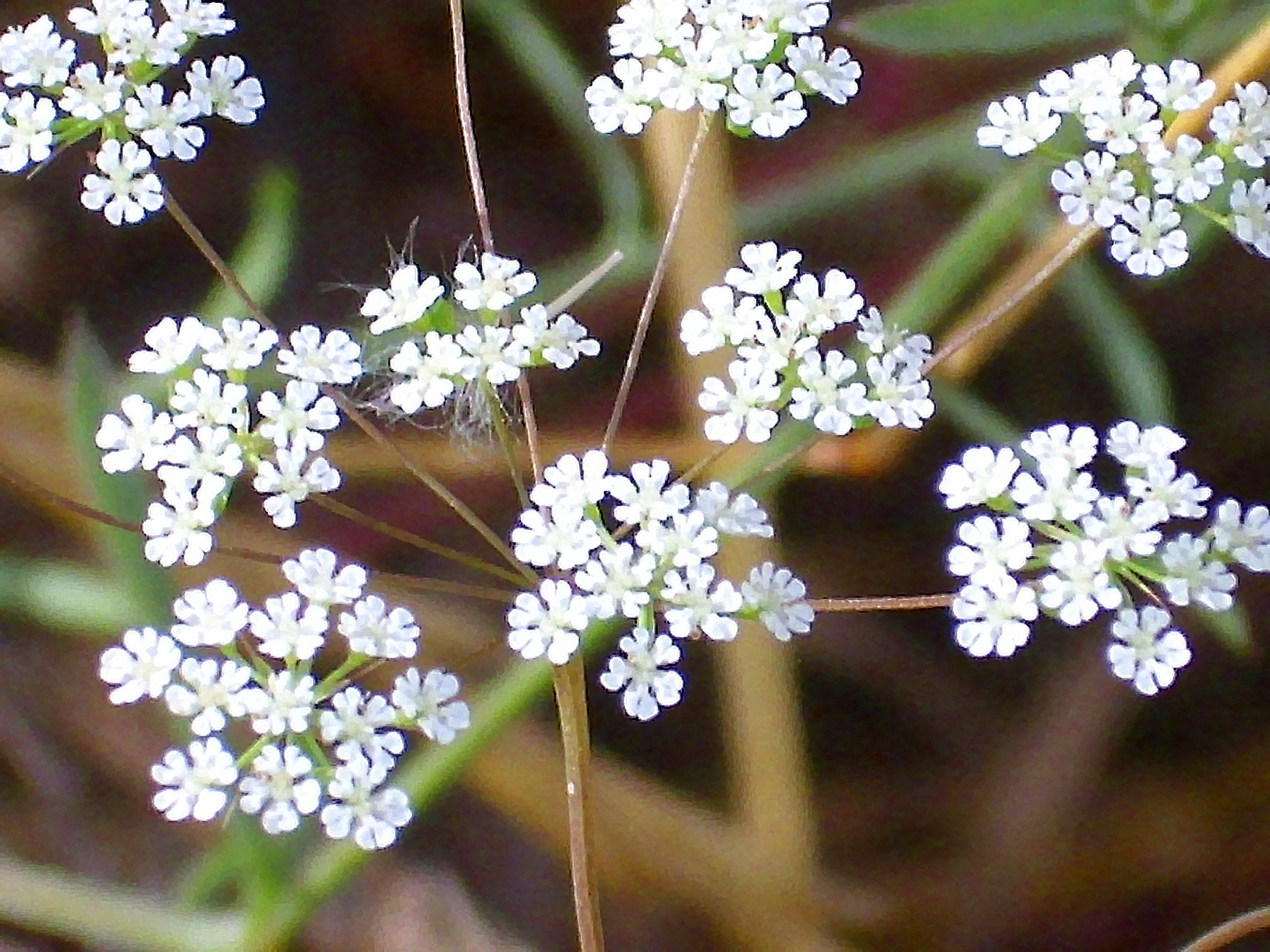

Scientific classification
- Kingdom: Plantae
- Clade: Tracheophytes
- Clade: Angiosperms
- Clade: Eudicots
- Clade: Asterids
- Order: Apiales
- Family: Apiaceae
- Genus: Ammoides
- Species: A. pusilla

Binomial name
- Ammoides pusilla (Brot.) Breistr.

Synonyms
- Seseli pusillum

= Ammoides pusilla =

Species of plant

Ammoides pusilla, the small bullwort, is a plant in the family Apiaceae.

== Sources ==
This article incorporates text from a free content work. Licensed under CC0 (license statement/permission). Text taken from Ammoides pusilla. Encyclopedia of Life.
