= Trévol =

- Commune
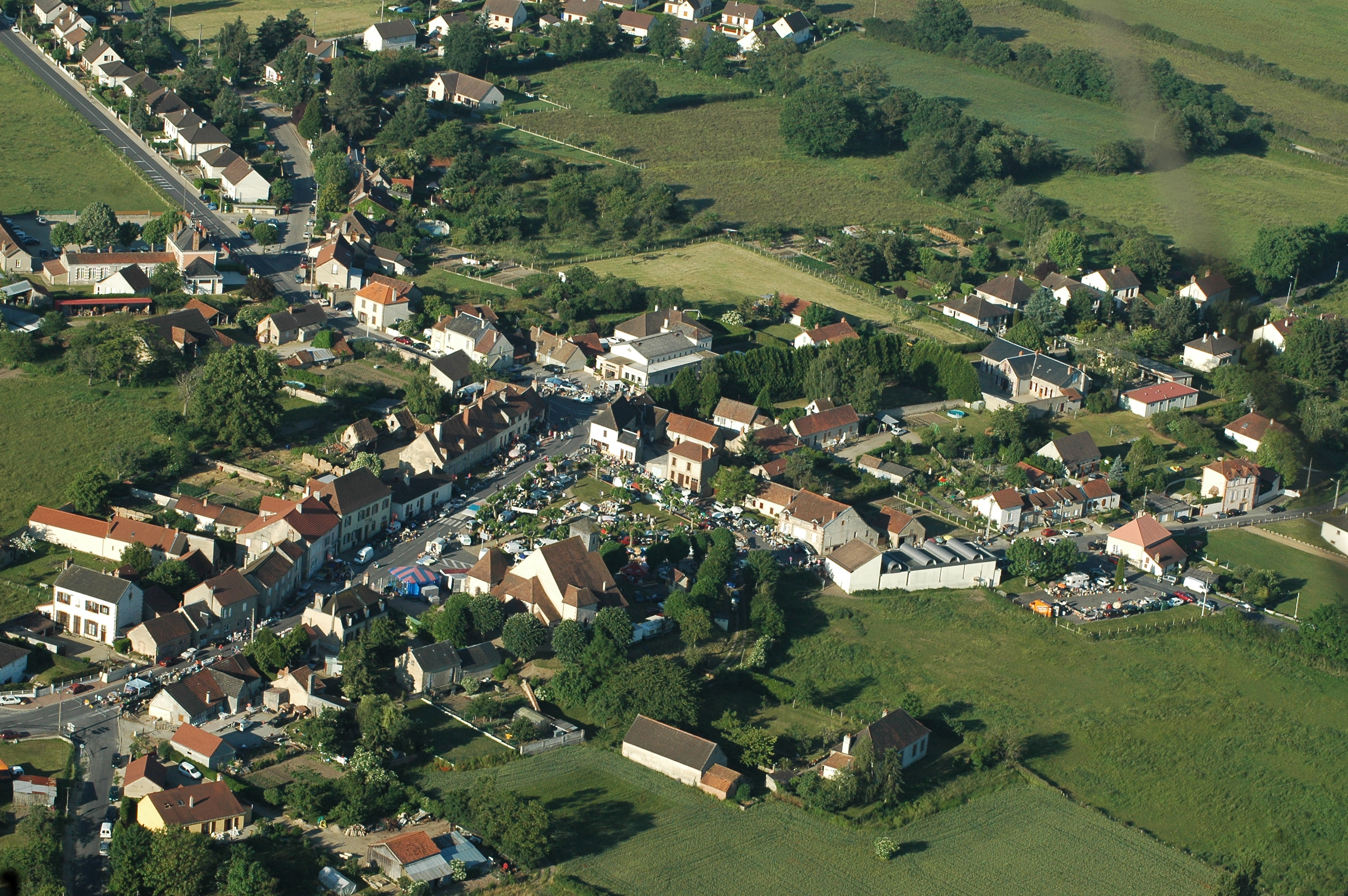
- An aerial view of Trévol

- Coat of arms
- Location of Trévol
- Location within France Location within Auvergne-Rhône-Alpes
- Coordinates: 46°37′48″N 3°18′24″E
- Country: France
- Region: Auvergne-Rhône-Alpes
- Department: Allier
- Arrondissement: Moulins
- Canton: Yzeure
- Intercommunality: CA Moulins Communauté

Government
  - Mayor (2026–32): Annick Anglares
- Area^{1}: 40.84 km^{2} (15.77 sq mi)
- Elevation: 245 m (804 ft)
- Highest elevation: 264 m (866 ft)
- Lowest elevation: 197 m (646 ft)
- Population (2023): 1,643
  - Density: 40.23/km^{2} (104.2/sq mi)
- Time zone: UTC+01:00 (CET)
  - Summer (DST): UTC+02:00 (CEST)
- INSEE/Postal code: 03290 /03460
- ^{1} French Land Register data, which excludes lakes, ponds, glaciers > 1 km^{2} (0.386 sq mi or 247 acres) and river estuaries.

Trévol (French pronunciation: [tʁevɔl]) is a commune in the Allier department in Auvergne-Rhône-Alpes in central France.

== History ==
Etymologically, Trévol comes from the Latin "Tres Valles", which means "Three Valleys" or "trifurcium", (the intersection of three paths). This is also symbolized in the coat of arms of the town. Under the old system (before 1789), Trévol enjoyed some prosperity through its woods, mills and also the relay station "La Perche", where the inn was known and where King Louis XIV stayed on 11 February 1692.

After the Second World War, the lime industry regained some momentum. Today there are no lime kilns anymore.

== Population ==
Historical population
| Year | Pop. | ±% p.a. |
|---|---|---|
| 1968 | 812 | — |
| 1975 | 1,004 | +3.08% |
| 1982 | 1,255 | +3.24% |
| 1990 | 1,405 | +1.42% |
| 1999 | 1,366 | −0.31% |
| 2007 | 1,580 | +1.84% |
| 2012 | 1,678 | +1.21% |
| 2017 | 1,625 | −0.64% |
| 2023 | 1,643 | +0.18% |
Source: INSEE

== See also ==
- Communes of the Allier department
