= Adanson system =

The Adanson system, published by French botanist Michel Adanson as the Familles des plantes in two volumes in 1763, was an important step in botanical nomenclature by establishing the ordering of genera into families.

Michel Adanson listed 58 families, divided by sections, for the 1615 genera known to him. He gave these both French and Latin names. The system was completed by Antoine Laurent de Jussieu in 1789.

== Plant families ==
Adanson's listing (Pages 1-7 of Part II) of families is as follows (with page numbers of families together with sections and genera in parentheses).
Note spelling varies throughout text. The detailed descriptions of families are separately paginated, and shown here in italics, after the Latin names. Some families shown with sections (note not all sections were named, some were just described).

1. Bissus (page 8) Byssi
2. Champignons Fungi 4
3. Fucus Fuci 12
4. Epatikes Hepaticae 14
5. Foujeres Filices 16
6. Palmiers Palmae 22
7. Gramens Gramina 26
8. Liliasees (page 9) Liliaceae 42
  1. Junci 46
  2. Lilia
  3. Scillae
  4. Cepae
  5. Asparagi 51
  6. Hyacinthi 52
  7. Narcissi 55
  8. Irides 58
9. Jenjanbres Zingiberes 61
10. Orchis Orchides 68
11. Aristoloches Aristolochiae 71
12. Eleagnus Elaeagni 77
13. Onagres Onagrae 81
14. Mirtes (page 10) Myrti 86
15. Ombelliferes Umbelletae 89
16. Composees Compositae 103
17. Campanules (page 11) Campanulae 132
18. Briones Bryoniae 135
19. Aparines Aparines 140
20. Scabieuses Scabiosae 148
21. Chevrefeuilles Caprifolia 153
22. Aireles Vaccinia 160 (Note: Corresponds to modern Ericaceae)
23. Apocins Apocyna 167
24. Bouraches Borragines 173
25. Labiees (page 12) Labiatae 180
26. Vervenes Verbenae 195
27. Personees Personatae 202
28. Solanons Solana 215
29. Jasmins Jasmina 220
30. Anagallis (page 13) Anagallides 227
31. Salikaires Salicariae 232
32. Pourpiers Portulacae 235
33. Joubarbes Seda 246
34. Alsines Alsines 250
35. Blitons Blita 258
36. Jalaps Jalapae 263
37. Amarantes Amaranthi 266
38. Espargoutes Spergulae 270
39. Persikaires Persicariae 273
40. Garou (page 14) Thymelaeae 278
41. Rosiers Rosae 286
42. Jujubiers Zizyphi 297
43. Legumineuses Leguminosae 306
44. Pistachiers (page 15) Pistaciae 332
45. Titimales Tithymali 346
46. Anones Anonae 359
47. Chataigners Castaneae 366
48. Tilleuls Tiliae 378
49. Geranions Gerania 384
50. Mauves Malvae 390
51. Capriers Capparides 402
52. Cruciferes (page 16) Cruciferae 409
53. Pavots Papavera 425
54. Cistes Cisti 434
55. Renoncules Ranunculi 451
56. Arons Ara 461
57. Pins (page 17) Pinus 473
58. Mousses Musci 482
