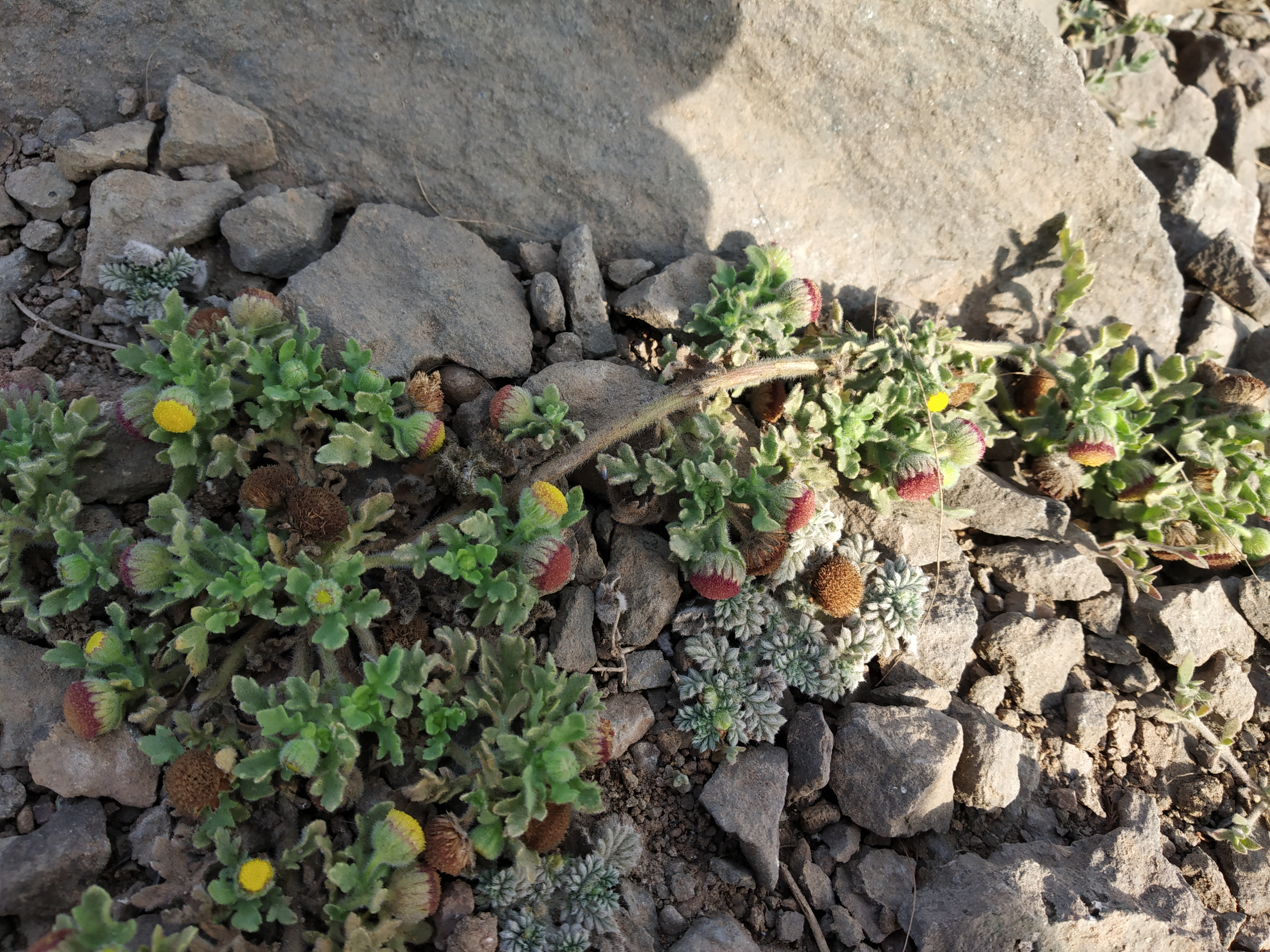

Conservation status
- Least Concern (IUCN 3.1)

Scientific classification
- Kingdom: Plantae
- Clade: Tracheophytes
- Clade: Angiosperms
- Clade: Eudicots
- Clade: Asterids
- Order: Asterales
- Family: Asteraceae
- Genus: Grangea
- Species: G. maderaspatana

Binomial name
- Grangea maderaspatana (L.) L. Poir

= Grangea maderaspatana =

Species of flowering plant

Grangea maderaspatana, commonly known as Madras carpet, is a flowering plant in the family Asteraceae.

== Description ==
This plant displays as a branched herb with cylindrical, grayish roots, growing up to 70 cm tall. The solitary flower heads are 6–8 mm (0.24–0.31 in) in diameter, with yellow florets. The achenes are compressed and narrowly winged.

== Distribution ==
This species grows commonly in moist places in warm temperate to tropical areas. It is widely distributed throughout India and Nepal.
