= Arboretum de Balaine =

Arboretum in Allier, Auvergne, France

Coordinates: 46.6970°N 3.2464°E

The Arboretum de Balaine (20 hectares) is a historic arboretum located in Villeneuve-sur-Allier, Allier, Auvergne, France. It is open daily from March to November; an admission fee is charged.

The arboretum was created in 1804 by Aglaé Adanson, daughter of naturalist Michel Adanson, as an English-style park on land surrounding a mansion that Aglaé inherited from her mother's companion. She formed an arboretum of exotic species, following the example of Joséphine de Beauharnais at the Château de Malmaison in Rueil. The family has continued to own the park through seven generations, since its creation, and describe it as the oldest private botanical park in France. It was classified a historical monument in 1993. Louise Courteix Adanson is the current owner.

Today the arboretum contains about 2500 taxa planted across 200 years, including Acer palmatum, Cypress, Fagus, Carya, Liquidambar, Nyssa, Quercus, and Sassafras, as well as azaleas, camellias, davidias, magnolias, rhododendrons, viburnums, a fine collection of Cornus, and old roses and hydrangeas. Noteworthy specimens include a 36-meter giant sequoia (Sequoiadendron giganteum) planted in 1856, a Sequoia sempervirens, a 45-meter bald cypress from Louisiana planted in 1822, and a 30-meter tupelo (Nyssa sylvatica).

== See also ==
- List of botanical gardens in France
