= Canton of Yzeure =

Coordinates: 46°34′01″N 3°21′19″E

Yzeure
- Canton
- Interactive map of Yzeure
- Country: France
- Region: Auvergne-Rhône-Alpes
- Department: Allier
- No. of communes: {{{nbcomm}}}

Government
  - Representatives (2021–2028): Pascale Foucault; Pascal Perrin
- Area: 214.66 km^{2} (82.88 sq mi)
- Population (2023): 17,205
  - Density: 80.150/km^{2} (207.59/sq mi)
- INSEE code: 03 19

The canton of Yzeure is a French administrative division in the department of Allier and region Auvergne-Rhône-Alpes.

== Composition ==
The communes in the canton of Yzeure:

1. Aurouër
2. Gennetines
3. Saint-Ennemond
4. Trévol
5. Villeneuve-sur-Allier
6. Yzeure
