= Gennetines =

- Commune
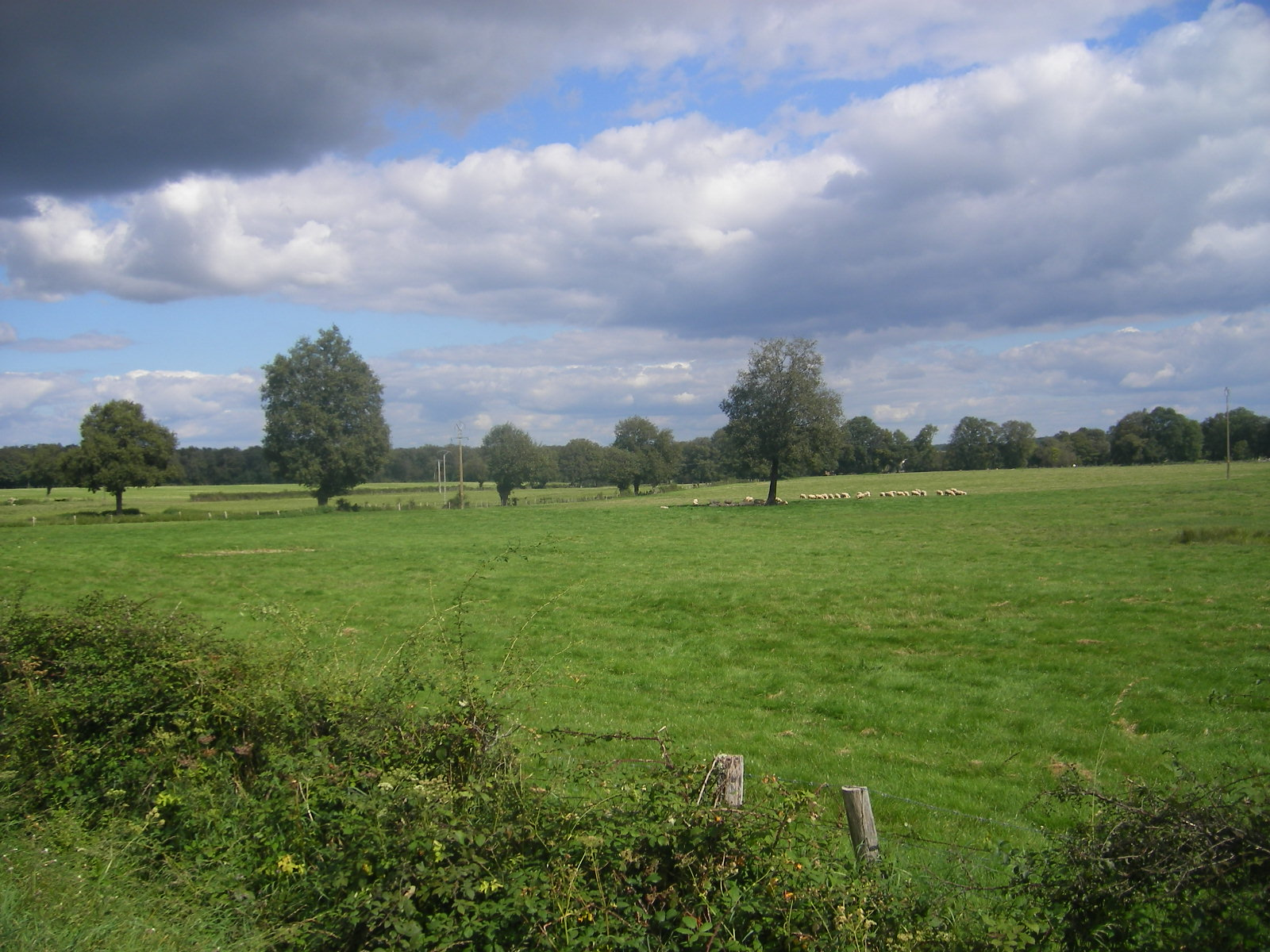
- The landscape around Gennetines

- Coat of arms
- Location of Gennetines
- Location within France Location within Auvergne-Rhône-Alpes
- Coordinates: 46°38′11″N 3°24′31″E
- Country: France
- Region: Auvergne-Rhône-Alpes
- Department: Allier
- Arrondissement: Moulins
- Canton: Yzeure
- Intercommunality: CA Moulins Communauté

Government
  - Mayor (2026–32): Noël Prugnaud
- Area^{1}: 39.14 km^{2} (15.11 sq mi)
- Elevation: 247 m (810 ft)
- Highest elevation: 267 m (876 ft)
- Lowest elevation: 224 m (735 ft)
- Population (2023): 615
  - Density: 15.7/km^{2} (40.7/sq mi)
- Time zone: UTC+01:00 (CET)
  - Summer (DST): UTC+02:00 (CEST)
- INSEE/Postal code: 03121 /03400
- ^{1} French Land Register data, which excludes lakes, ponds, glaciers > 1 km^{2} (0.386 sq mi or 247 acres) and river estuaries.

Gennetines (French pronunciation: [ʒɛntin]) is a commune in the Allier department in central France.

== Population ==
Historical population
Year	Pop.	±% p.a.
1968	477	—
1975	434	−1.34%
1982	537	+3.09%
1990	554	+0.39%
1999	559	+0.10%
2007	549	−0.23%
2012	686	+4.56%
2017	670	−0.47%
2023	615	−1.42%
Source: INSEE

== See also ==
- Communes of the Allier department
