= Saint-Ennemond =

- Commune
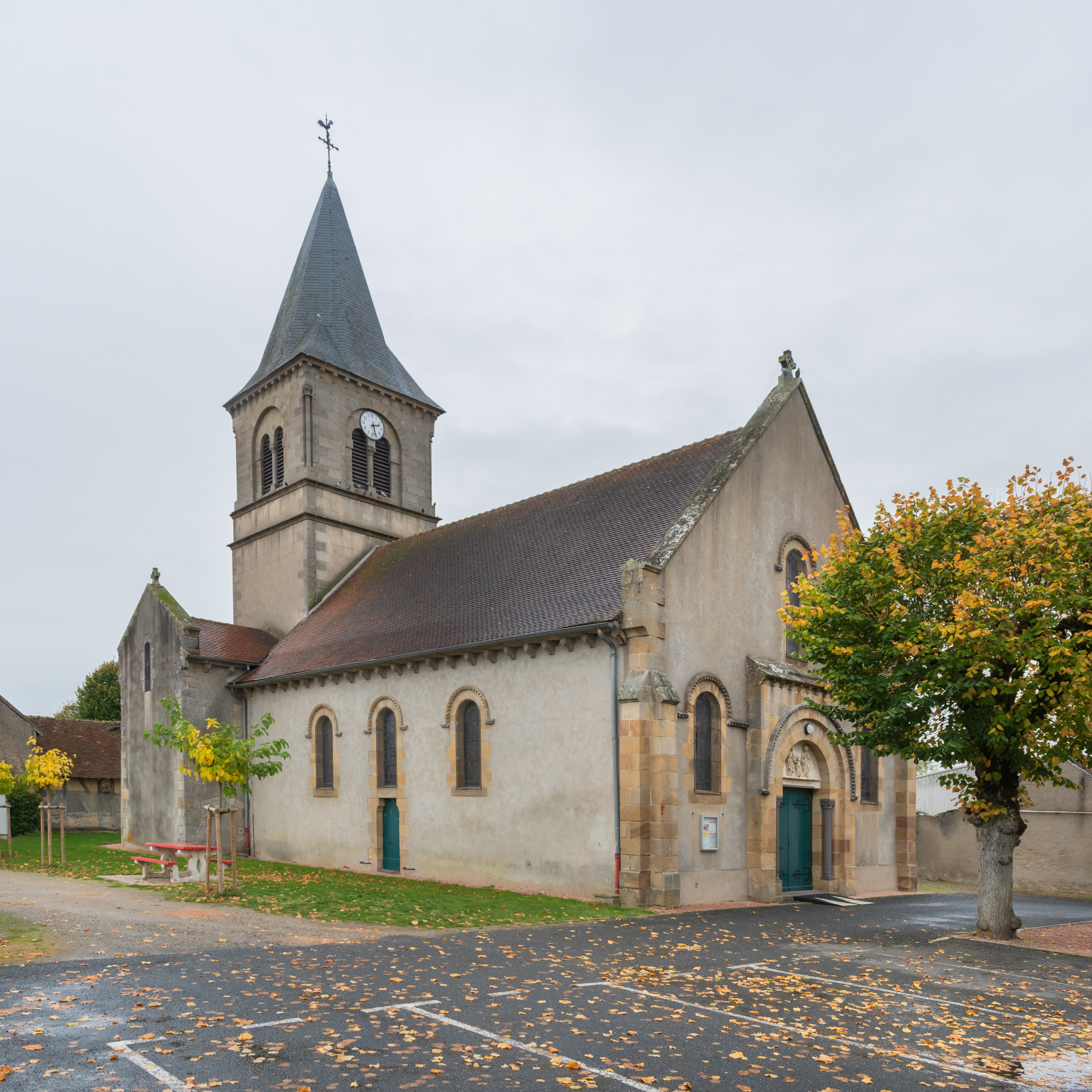
- The church in Saint-Ennemond

- Coat of arms
- Location of Saint-Ennemond
- Location within France Location within Auvergne-Rhône-Alpes
- Coordinates: 46°40′37″N 3°25′24″E
- Country: France
- Region: Auvergne-Rhône-Alpes
- Department: Allier
- Arrondissement: Moulins
- Canton: Yzeure
- Intercommunality: CA Moulins Communauté

Government
  - Mayor (2026–32): Lydie Perot-Clavel
- Area^{1}: 38.08 km^{2} (14.70 sq mi)
- Elevation: 220 m (720 ft)
- Highest elevation: 258 m (846 ft)
- Lowest elevation: 209 m (686 ft)
- Population (2023): 626
  - Density: 16.4/km^{2} (42.6/sq mi)
- Time zone: UTC+01:00 (CET)
  - Summer (DST): UTC+02:00 (CEST)
- INSEE/Postal code: 03229 /03400
- ^{1} French Land Register data, which excludes lakes, ponds, glaciers > 1 km^{2} (0.386 sq mi or 247 acres) and river estuaries.

Saint-Ennemond (French pronunciation: [sɛ̃.t‿ɛnmɔ̃]) is a commune in the Allier department in Auvergne-Rhône-Alpes in central France.

== Geography ==
The village is located on the border of the Nièvre department, bordered by the villages Lucenay-lès-Aix and Dornes.

== Denomination ==
The town is named after Saint Ennemond, bishop of Lyon in the 6th century.

== History ==
During the revolutionary period (1792–1795), the town took the name of Labron.

== Politics and Administration ==
The mayor is Lydie Perot-Clavel.

== Population ==
Historical population

Year	Pop.	±% p.a.
1793	577	—
1800	592	+0.37%
1821	623	+0.24%
1831	601	−0.36%
1841	632	+0.50%
1861	783	+1.08%
1872	906	+1.34%
1881	1,114	+2.32%
1891	1,157	+0.38%
1896	1,175	+0.31%
1901	1,019	−2.81%
1911	982	−0.37%
1921	847	−1.47%

Year	Pop.	±% p.a.
1931	826	−0.25%
1946	828	+0.02%
1954	802	−0.40%
1962	827	+0.38%
1968	827	+0.00%
1975	658	−3.21%
1982	671	+0.28%
1990	649	−0.42%
1999	617	−0.56%
2007	649	+0.63%
2012	649	+0.00%
2017	626	−0.72%
2023	626	+0.00%

Source: EHESS and INSEE

== Coat of arms ==
The coat of arms of the municipality is a Coupé au 1) Vert with the Golden Boar, 2nd) party Gules a chevron and silver bell mouths.

== See also ==
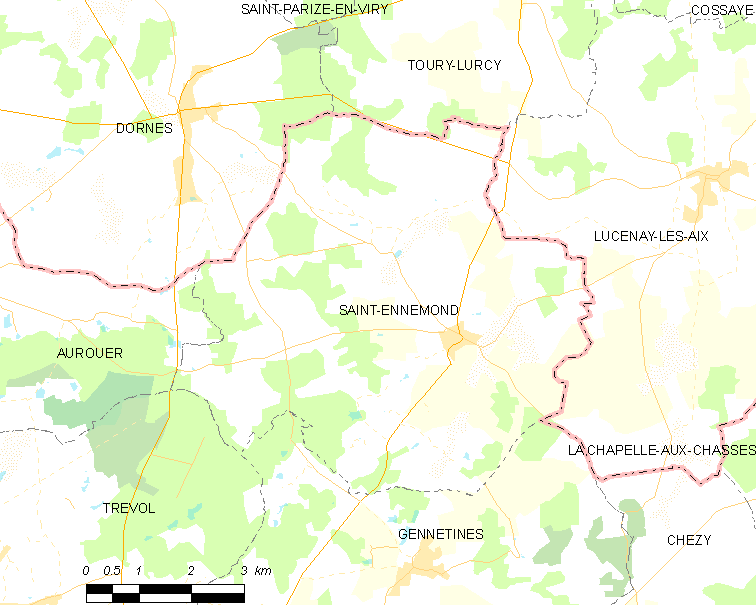
Map of Saint-Ennemond.

- Communes of the Allier department
