= Dornes, Nièvre =

Dornes
- Commune
- Coat of arms
- Location of Dornes
- Location within France Location within Bourgogne-Franche-Comté
- Coordinates: 46°42′57″N 3°21′12″E
- Country: France
- Region: Bourgogne-Franche-Comté
- Department: Nièvre
- Arrondissement: Nevers
- Canton: Saint-Pierre-le-Moûtier
- Intercommunality: CA Moulins Communauté

Government
  - Mayor (2020–2026): Jean-Luc Gauthier
- Area^{1}: 39.49 km^{2} (15.25 sq mi)
- Highest elevation: 261 m (856 ft)
- Lowest elevation: 207 m (679 ft)
- Population (2023): 1,437
  - Density: 36.39/km^{2} (94.25/sq mi)
- Time zone: UTC+01:00 (CET)
  - Summer (DST): UTC+02:00 (CEST)
- INSEE/Postal code: 58104 /58390
- ^{1} French Land Register data, which excludes lakes, ponds, glaciers > 1 km^{2} (0.386 sq mi or 247 acres) and river estuaries.

Dornes (French pronunciation: [dɔʁn]) is a commune in the south of Nièvre department in central France.

== See also ==
- Communes of the Nièvre department
