= Michel Adanson =

French naturalist (1727–1806)

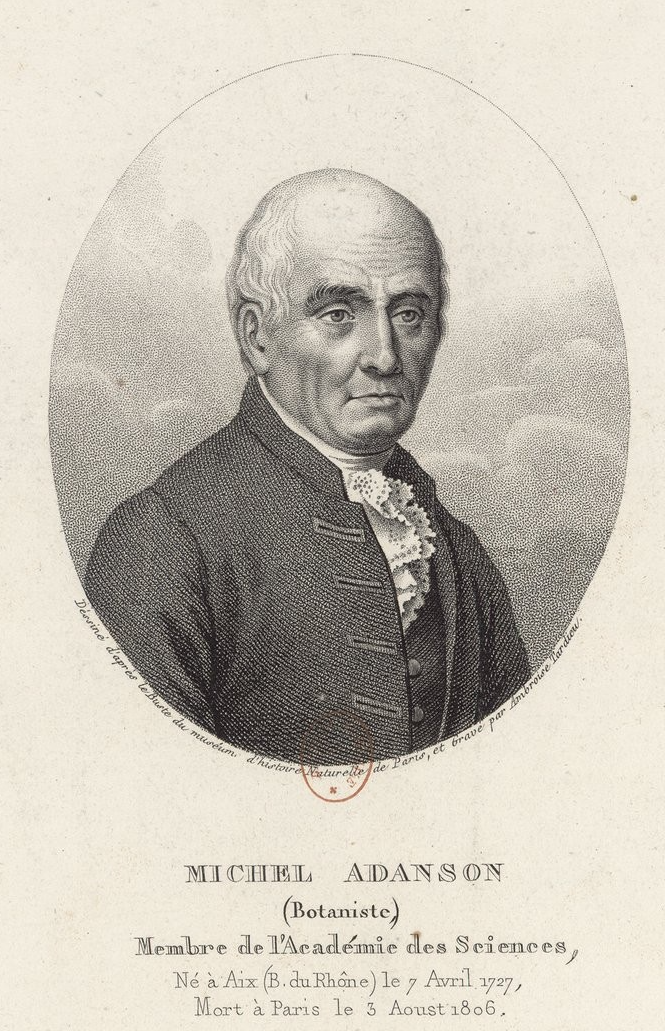
- Michel Adanson
- Born: 7 April 1727; Aix-en-Provence
- Died: 3 August 1806 (aged 79)
- Scientific career
- Fields: Naturalist
- Workplaces: Jardin des Plantes
- Author abbrev. (botany): Adans.

Michel Adanson (7 April 1727 – 3 August 1806) was an 18th-century French botanist and naturalist who travelled to Senegal to study flora and fauna. He proposed a "natural system" of taxonomy distinct from the binomial system forwarded by Linnaeus. The standard author abbreviation Adans. is used to indicate this person as the author when citing a botanical name.

== Personal history ==
Adanson was born at Aix-en-Provence. His family moved to Paris in 1730. After leaving the Collège Sainte-Barbe, he was employed in the cabinets of R. A. F. Réaumur and Bernard de Jussieu, as well as in the Jardin des Plantes, Paris. He attended lectures at the Jardin du Roi and the Collège Royal in Paris from 1741 to 1746. At the end of 1748, funded by a director of the Compagnie des Indes, he left France on an exploring expedition to Senegal. He remained there for five years, collecting and describing numerous animals and plants. He also collected specimens of every object of commerce, delineated maps of the country, made systematic meteorological and astronomical observations, and prepared grammars and dictionaries of the languages spoken on the banks of the Sénégal.

After his return to Paris in 1754 he made use of a small portion of the materials he had collected in his Histoire naturelle du Senegal (1757). Sales of the work were slow, and after the publisher's bankruptcy and the reimbursement to subscribers, Adanson estimated the cost of the book to him had been 5,000 livres, beginning the penury in which he lived the rest of his life. This work has a special interest from the essay on shells, printed at the end of it, where Adanson proposed his universal method, a system of classification distinct from those of Buffon and Linnaeus. He founded his classification of all organised beings on the consideration of each individual organ. As each organ gave birth to new relations, so he established a corresponding number of arbitrary arrangements. Those beings possessing the greatest number of similar organs were referred to one great division, and the relationship was considered more remote in proportion to the dissimilarity of organs.

== Familles des plantes ==
In 1763 he published his Familles des plantes. In this work he developed the principle of arrangement above mentioned, which, in its adherence to natural botanical relations, was based on the system of Joseph Pitton de Tournefort, and had been anticipated to some extent nearly a century before by John Ray. The success of this work was hindered by its innovations in the use of terms, which were ridiculed by the defenders of the popular sexual system of Linnaeus; but it did much to open the way for the establishment, by means principally of Antoine Laurent de Jussieu's Genera Plantarum (1789), of the natural method of the classification of plants.

In 1774 Adanson submitted to the consideration of the French Academy of Sciences an immense work, extending to all known beings and substances. It consisted of 27 large volumes of manuscript, employed in displaying the general relations of all these matters, and their distribution; 150 volumes more, occupied with the alphabetical arrangement of 40,000 species; a vocabulary, containing 200,000 words, with their explanations; and a number of detached memoirs, 40,000 figures and 30,000 specimens of the three kingdoms of nature. The committee to which the inspection of this enormous mass was entrusted strongly recommended Adanson to separate and publish all that was peculiarly his own, leaving out what was merely compilation. He obstinately rejected this advice; and the huge work, at which he continued to labour, was never published.

== Evolution ==
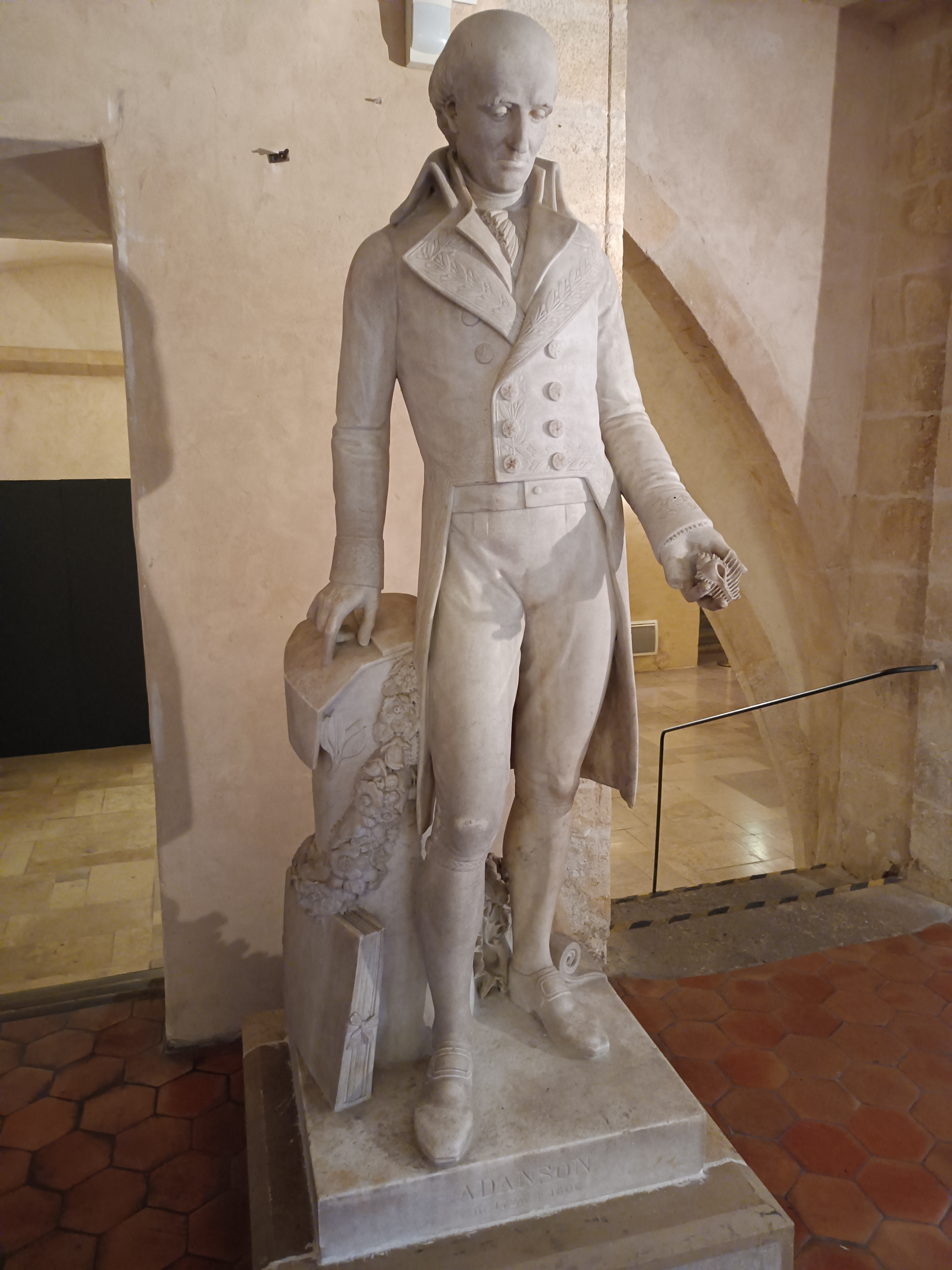
Marble statue of Adanson displayed at the former Episcopal Palace in Aix-en-Provence, depicted holding a shell

Adanson was an early proponent of the inheritance of acquired characters and a limited view of evolution. Historian of science Conway Zirkle has noted that "Adanson was Lamarck's predecessor at the Jardin Royal, and Lamarck could hardly have remained unfamiliar with Adanson 's publications. Adanson not only described evolution in his "Familles de plantes", published in 1763 when Lamarck was a young man of twenty, but also suggested that the changes in specific characteristics were produced through the inheritance of acquired characters."

In an article for the Histoire and Memoires de l'Academie Royale des Sciences of 1769, Adanson used the term "mutations" to refer to small changes that could bring about new variations in individuals. Despite being described as a "precursor of evolutionism" by historians, Adanson rejected the concept of species, preferring to focus on individuals and denied the transmutation of species.

Adanson made a serious attempt to classify fungi based on their fruit body complexity. He was the first botanist to classify lichens with fungi.

== Later life ==
He had been elected a member of the Academy of Sciences in 1759, and he latterly subsisted on a small pension it had conferred on him. Of this he was deprived in the dissolution of the Academy by the Constituent Assembly in 1793, and was consequently reduced to such a depth of poverty as to be unable to appear before the French Institute when it invited him to take his place among its members. (It is said that he possessed neither a white shirt, a coat nor a whole pair of breeches.) Afterwards he was granted a pension sufficient to relieve his simple wants.

== Death and legacy ==
He died in Paris after months of severe suffering, requesting, as the only decoration of his grave, a garland of flowers gathered from the fifty-eight families he had differentiated – "a touching though transitory image," says Georges Cuvier, "of the more durable monument which he has erected to himself in his works."

Besides the books already mentioned he published papers on the ship-worm, the baobab tree (whose generic name Adansonia commemorates Adanson), the origin of the varieties of cultivated plants, and gum-producing trees.

His papers and herbarium remained in his family's hands for over a century and a half, finally coming to the Hunt Institute for Botanical Documentation at Carnegie Mellon University, Pittsburgh, in 1961–62. Subsequently, the Hunt Institute republished his Familles des plantes in two volumes (1963–64), under the editorship of George H. M. Lawrence.

His only child, Aglaé Adanson (1775–1852) became a French horticulturalist, writer and creator of the Baleine Arboretum, a National Historic monument, which is operated today by his great-great-great-granddaughter, Louise Courteix Adanson.

A species of turtle, Pelusios adansonii, is named in his honour.

== In literature ==
In The Reverse of the Medal, the eleventh novel in the series and, again, in The Commodore, the seventeenth novel of Patrick O'Brian's Aubrey-Maturin series, Stephen Maturin makes reference to Adanson. He elaborates on Adanson's botanical work in Senegal, the prodigious volume of his written output and his penurious circumstances at the time of his death.

Stephen Maturin:

"He was a very great naturalist, as zealous, prolific and industrious as he was unfortunate. I knew him in Paris when I was young, and admired him extremely; so did Cuvier. At that time he was very kind to us. When he was little more than a youth he went to Senegal, stayed there five or six years, observing, collecting, dissecting, describing and classifying; and he summarised all this in a brief but eminently respectable natural history of the country, from which I learnt almost everything I know of the African flora and fauna. A valuable book, indeed, and the outcome of intense and long sustained effort; but I can scarcely venture to name it on the same day as his maximum opus – twenty seven large volumes devoted to a systematic account of created beings and substances and the relations between them, together with a hundred and fifty volumes more of index, exact scientific description, separate treatises and a vocabulary: a hundred and fifty volumes, Jack, with forty thousand drawings and thirty thousand specimens. All this he showed to the Academy. It was much praised but never published. Yet he continued working on it in poverty and old age, and I like to think he was happy in his immense design, and with the admiration of such men as Jussieu and the Institute in general.

David Diop's novel La porte du voyage sans retour (The door of the voyage without return) was inspired by and is about Adanson's experiences in Senegal.

== See also ==
- Arboretum de Balaine
- Adanson system
- Category: Taxa named by Michel Adanson

== Bibliography ==
- Eiselt, J. N. 1836 Geschichte, Systematik und Literatur der Insectenkunde, von den ältesten Zeiten bis auf die Gegenwart. Als Handbuch für den Jünger und als Repertorium für den Meister der Entomologie bearbeitet. Leipzig, C. H. F. Hartmann : VIII+255 p.
- Nicolas, J.P. (1970). "Adanson, Michel". Dictionary of Scientific Biography. Vol. 1. New York: Charles Scribner's Sons. pp. 58–59. ISBN 0-684-10114-9.
- A Voyage to Senegal, the Isle of Goree, and the River Gambia, 1759—Translation of Histoire naturelle du Sénégal
