= Villeneuve-sur-Allier =

- Commune
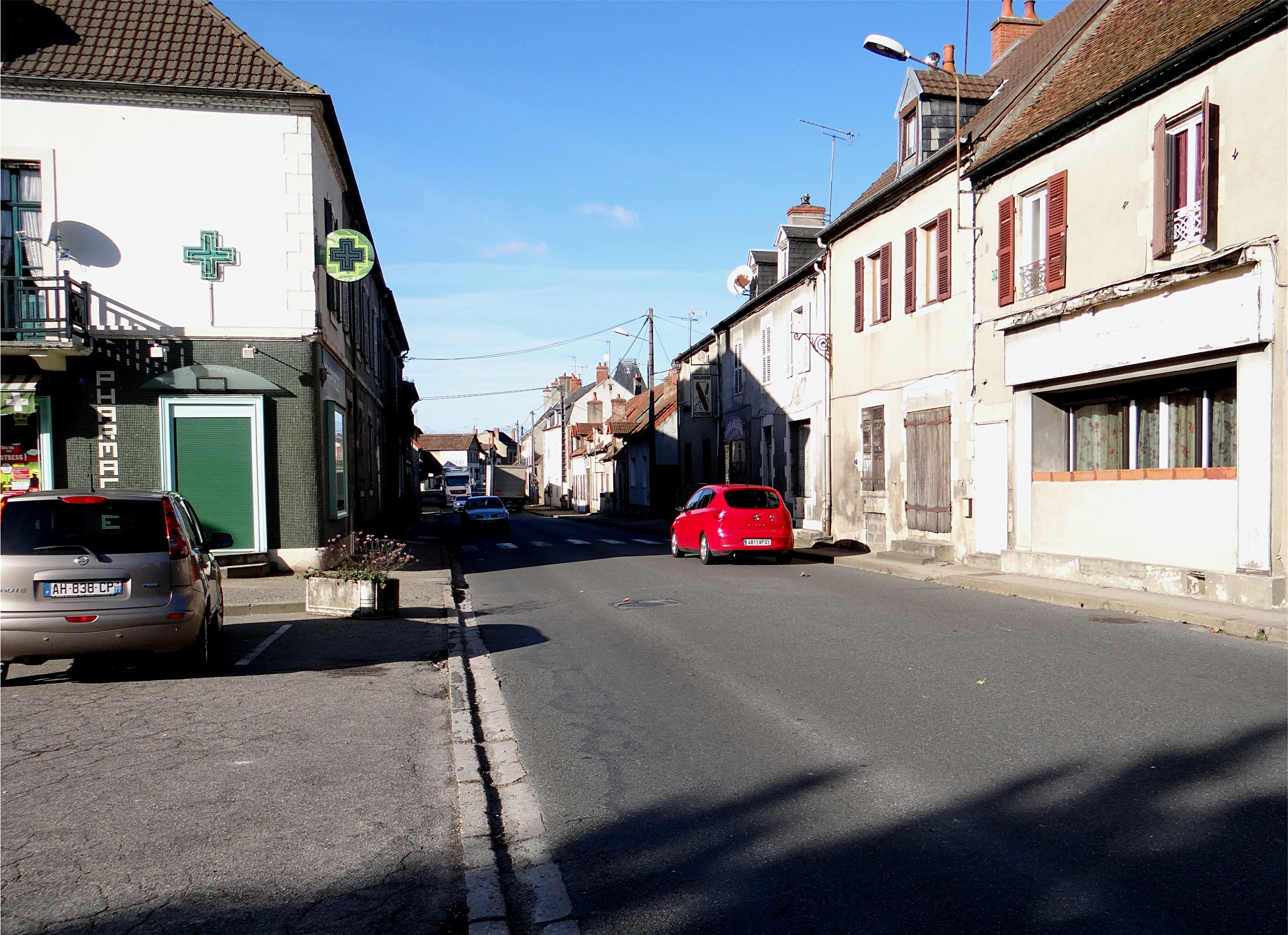
- The N7 road in Villeneuve-sur-Allier

- Coat of arms
- Location of Villeneuve-sur-Allier
- Location within France Location within Auvergne-Rhône-Alpes
- Coordinates: 46°39′39″N 3°14′57″E
- Country: France
- Region: Auvergne-Rhône-Alpes
- Department: Allier
- Arrondissement: Moulins
- Canton: Yzeure
- Intercommunality: CA Moulins Communauté

Government
  - Mayor (2026–32): Dominique Desforges-Désamin
- Area^{1}: 26.3 km^{2} (10.2 sq mi)
- Elevation: 210 m (690 ft)
- Highest elevation: 257 m (843 ft)
- Lowest elevation: 194 m (636 ft)
- Population (2023): 1,024
  - Density: 38.9/km^{2} (101/sq mi)
- Time zone: UTC+01:00 (CET)
  - Summer (DST): UTC+02:00 (CEST)
- INSEE/Postal code: 03316 /03460
- ^{1} French Land Register data, which excludes lakes, ponds, glaciers > 1 km^{2} (0.386 sq mi or 247 acres) and river estuaries.

Villeneuve-sur-Allier (French pronunciation: [vilnœv syʁ alje]) is a commune in the Allier department in Auvergne-Rhône-Alpes in France.

== Population ==
Historical population
| Year | Pop. | ±% p.a. |
|---|---|---|
| 1968 | 877 | — |
| 1975 | 910 | +0.53% |
| 1982 | 969 | +0.90% |
| 1990 | 971 | +0.03% |
| 1999 | 939 | −0.37% |
| 2007 | 954 | +0.20% |
| 2012 | 1,024 | +1.43% |
| 2017 | 1,071 | +0.90% |
| 2023 | 1,024 | −0.75% |
Source: INSEE

== Sights ==
- Arboretum de Balaine

== See also ==
- Communes of the Allier department
