= Souvigny Priory =

Priory in Allier, France

Coordinates: 46.5348°N 3.1932°E

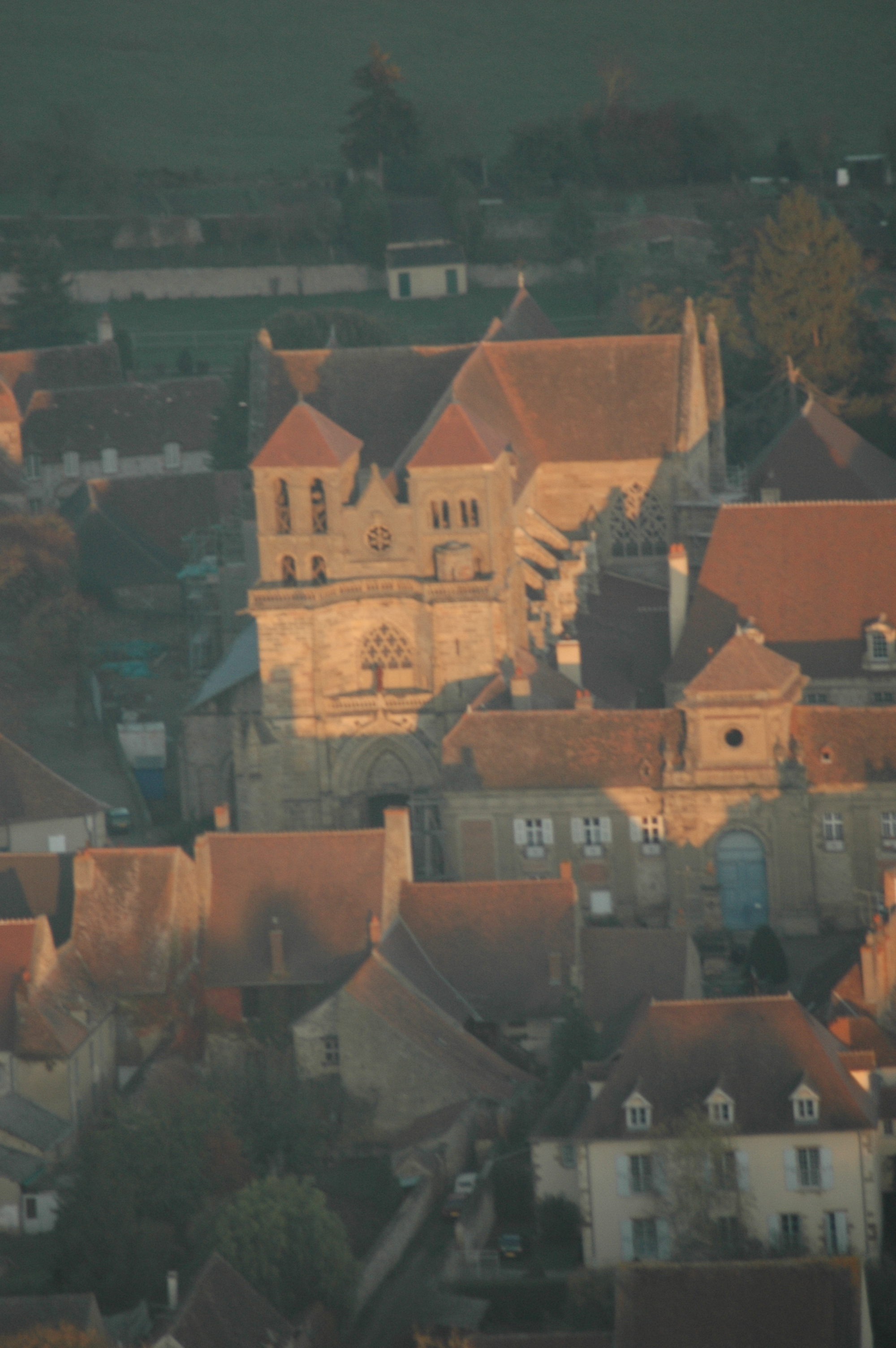
Souvigny Priory church

Souvigny Priory (French: Prieuré Saint-Pierre-et-Saint-Paul de Souvigny, Prieuré Saint-Mayeul de Souvigny), in the commune of Souvigny, Allier, France, in the centre of the old province of the Bourbonnais, was formerly a Cluniac priory, of which the church remains in operation.

== History ==
In the 10th century Aymar sire de Bourbon gave land in Souvigny to Cluny Abbey for the construction of a monastery. Some years later, two distinguished abbots of Cluny, Mayeul of Cluny and Odilo of Cluny (Odilon de Mercoeur), came here to die, one after the other, and were buried here. This made the priory a place of pilgrimage: even Hugh Capet, King of France, came here in 994 after the death of Mayeul. The church was rebuilt to accommodate the increasing numbers of worshippers, on the model of Cluny III, including two transepts, a choir with an ambulatory, and three towers. The Dukes of Bourbon made it their place of burial. Many chapels were added, and the upper parts of the church were rebuilt, with cross vaults.

In 1097, Pope Urban II passed through Souvigny and while he was there confirmed by a Papal bull the possession of the church of Marigny to Bernard, fourth prior. This possession was confirmed again by a bull of Pope Eugene III dated 29 February 1152. In 1393, the provincial visitors instructed the prior to oblige the chantry to instruct children.

Souvigny, as one of the five oldest daughter houses of Cluny, owned many parishes and small priories, which made it wealthy. Its priories included those of Saint-Patrocle-de-Colombier, Chantenay-Saint-Imbert, Mars-sur-Allier and Montempuis (Saint-Parize-en-Viry).

The dedication varied between Saint Peter, Saint Mayeul and Saints Peter and Paul.

The priory was closed down and largely dismantled in the French Revolution, but the church survived and was reopened for worship in 1852. It was declared a monument historique on 5 August 1919.

== Architecture ==
=== Priory church ===
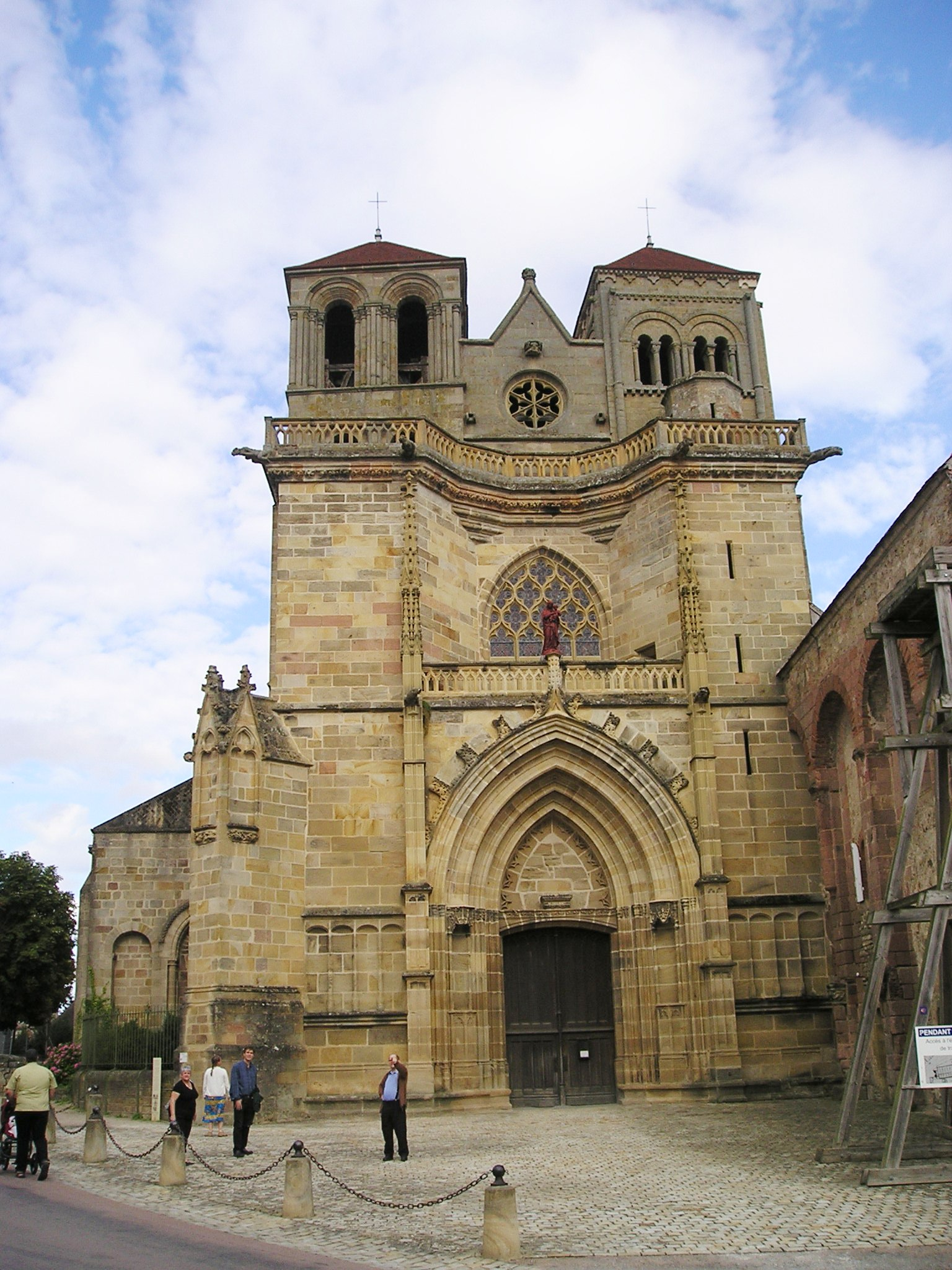
Priory church

The imposing priory church is part Romanesque and part Gothic. The structure is Romanesque but the vaulting is Gothic. The west front was reconstructed in the Gothic period while retaining the two Romanesque belltowers on top of it. This priory, because it was owned by the powerful Cluny Abbey, made it possible for the Burgundian style to develop in the numerous Romanesque churches of the Souvigny region.

The church measures 84 metres in length; the vaulted roof is 17 metres high at its highest point.

A carved Romanesque pillar was discovered in the church depicting a calendar with the farming works of each month, known as the "Zodiac of Souvigny".

=== Conventual buildings ===
The cloister, chapter room and porter's lodge are the principal conventual buildings still extant. The cloister was refurbished in 1432.

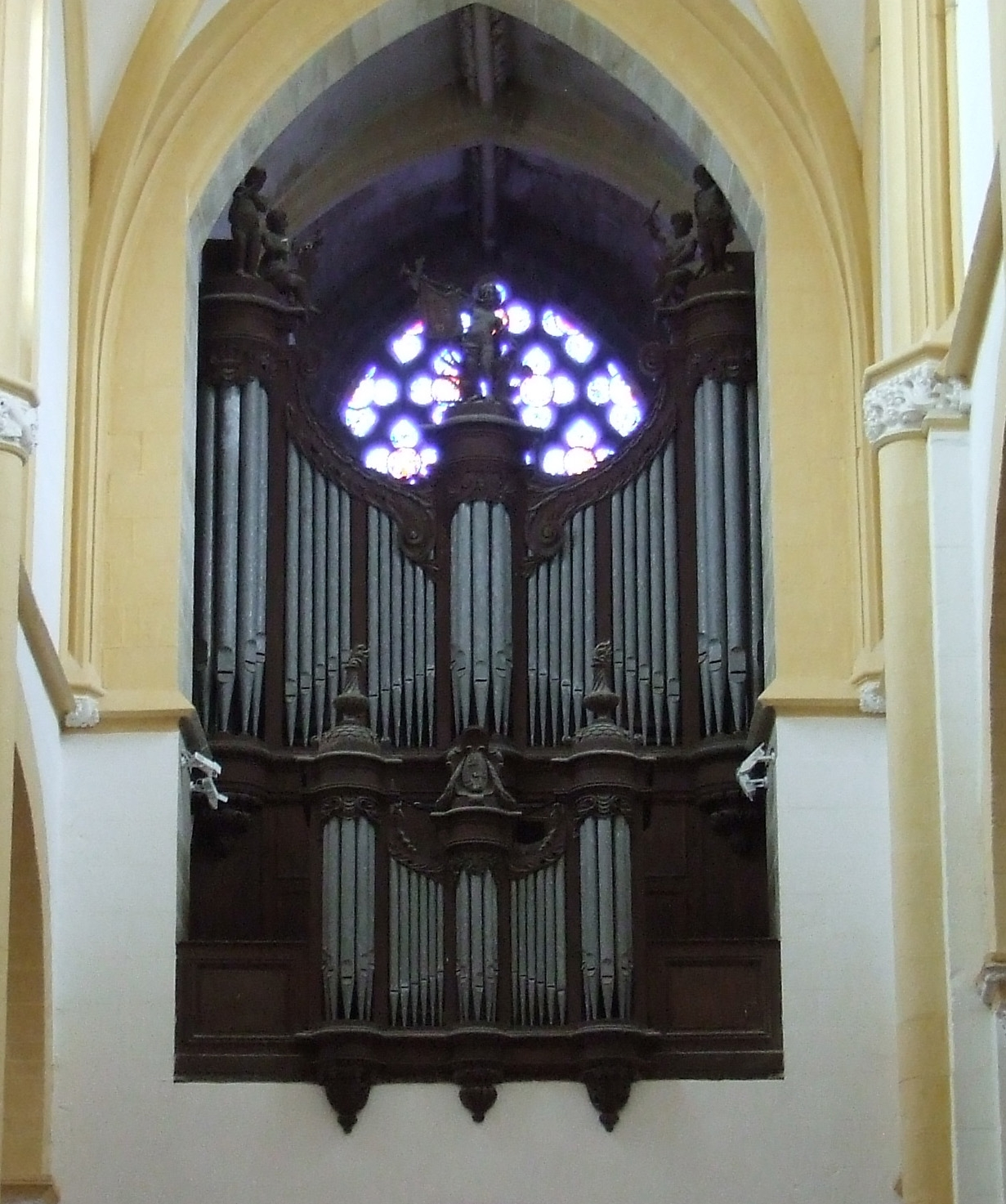
Organ built by François-Henri Clicquot, 1783

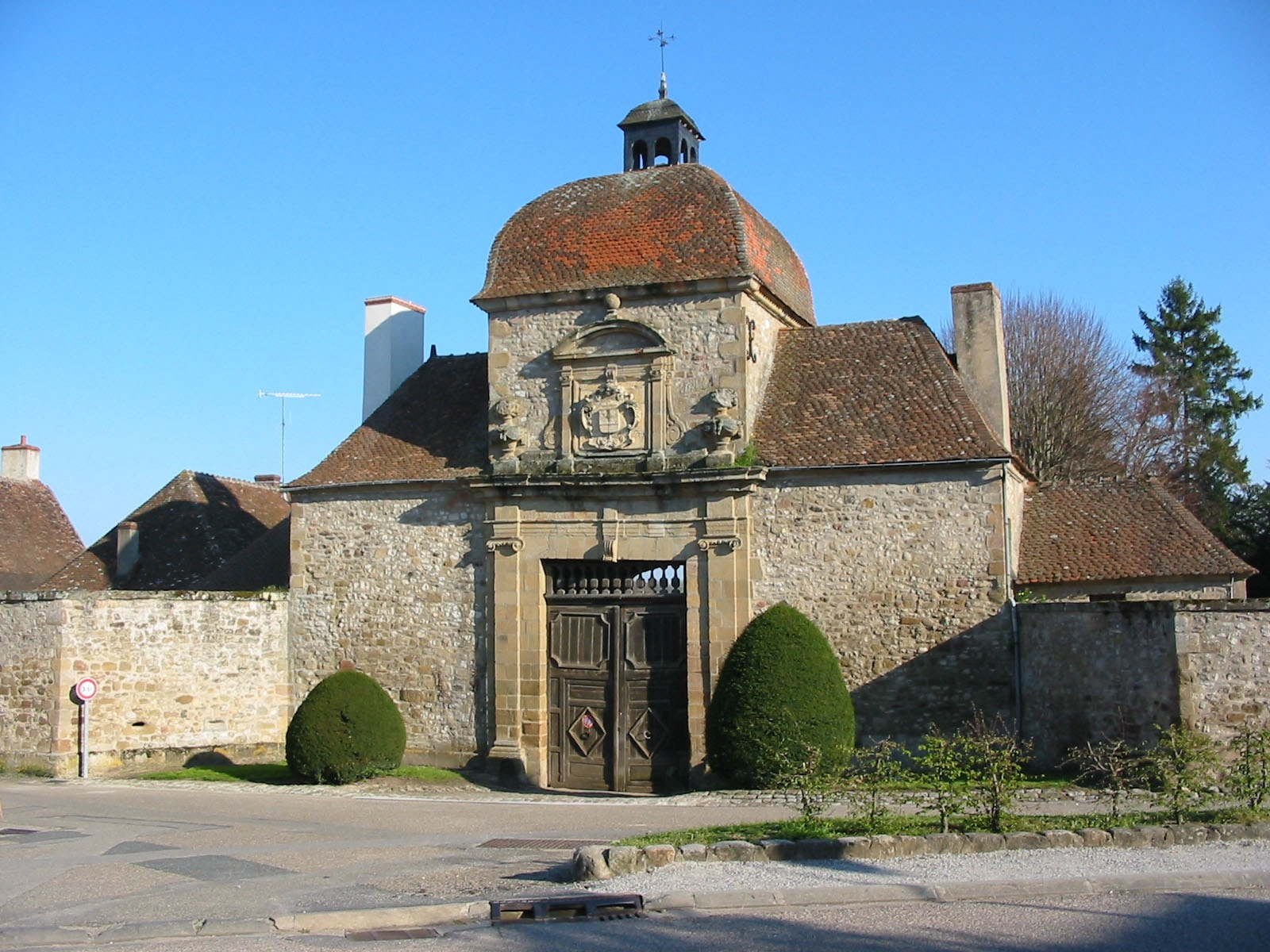
Porter's lodge

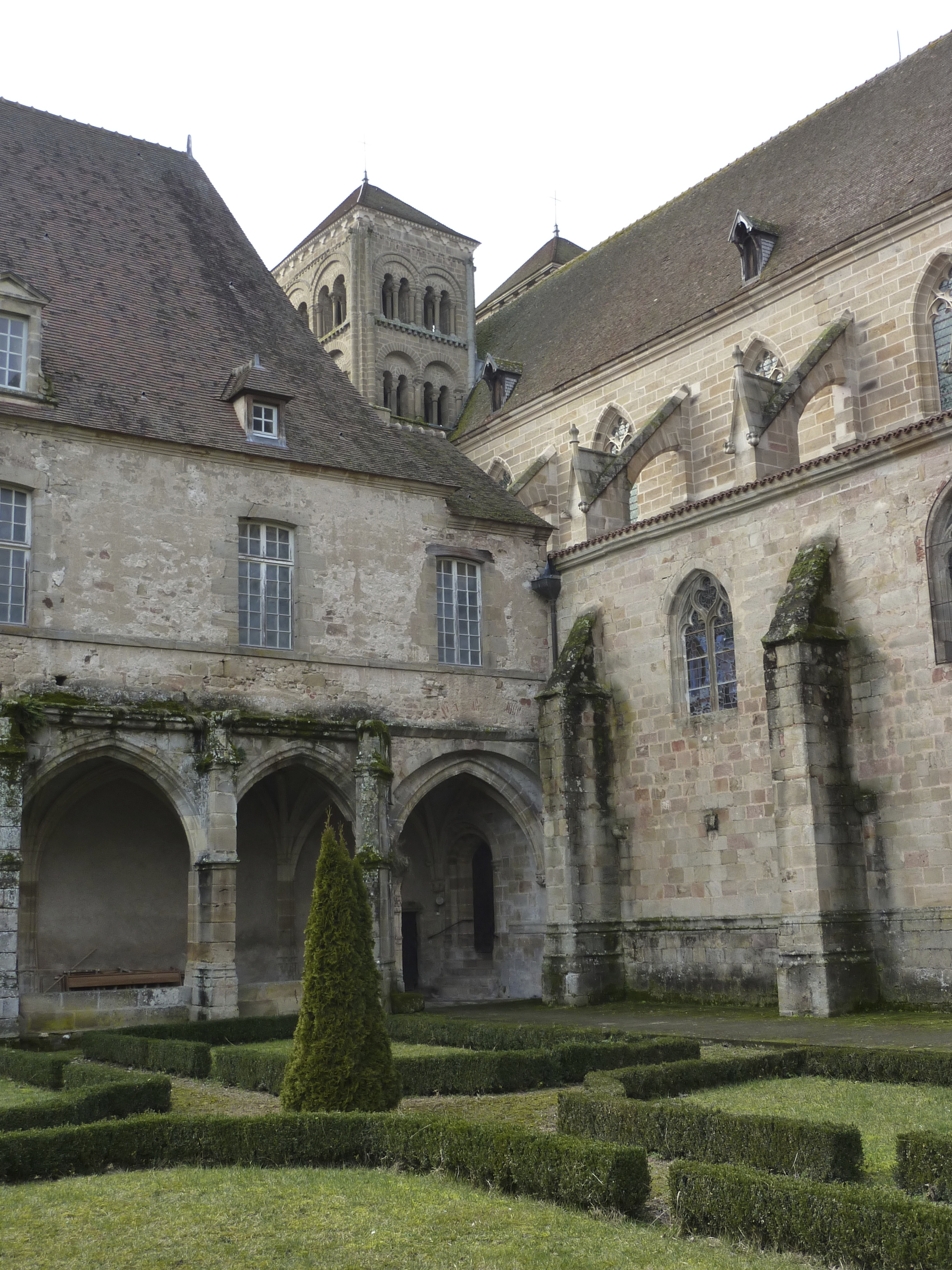
Cloister

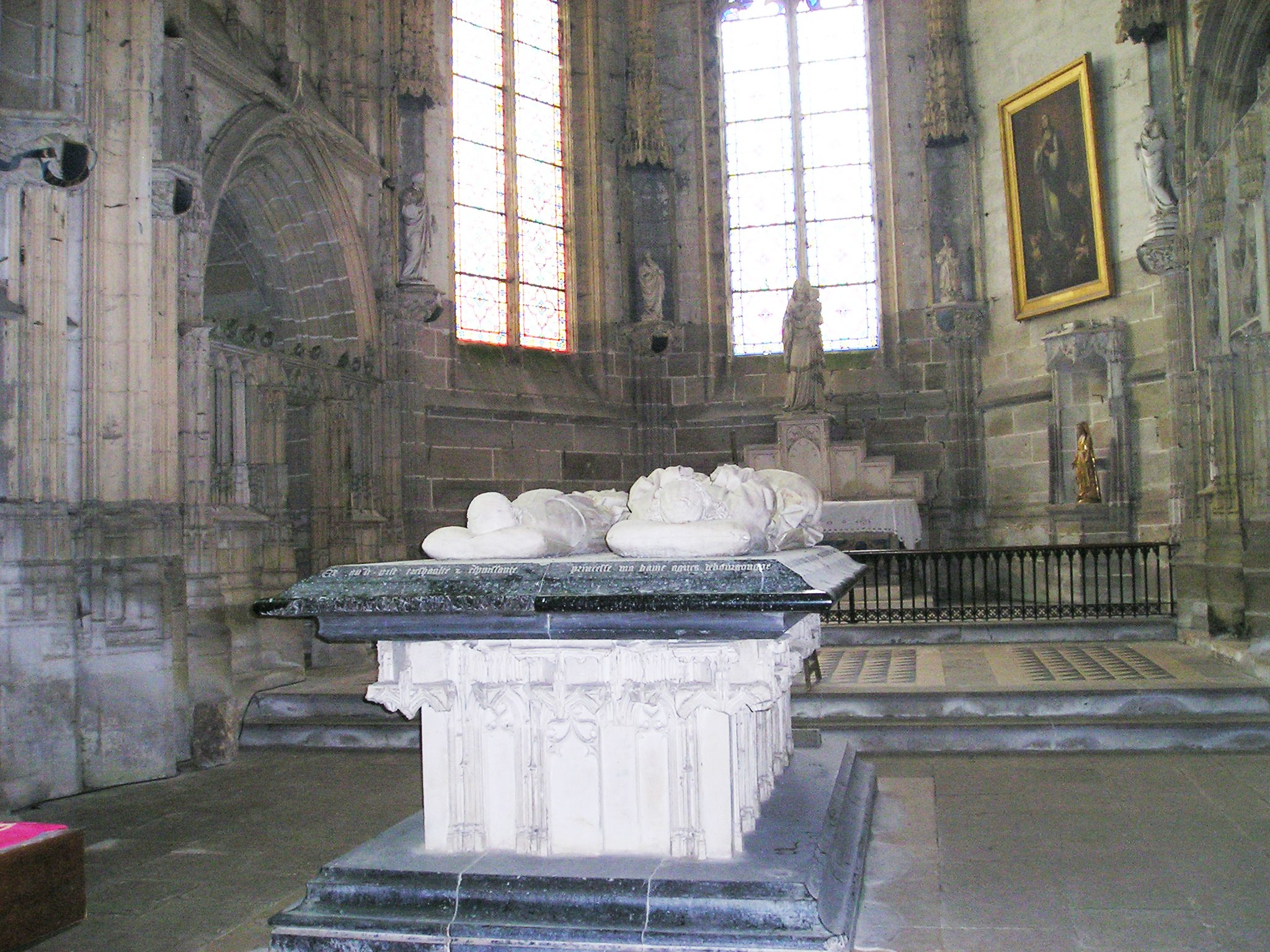
New Chapel

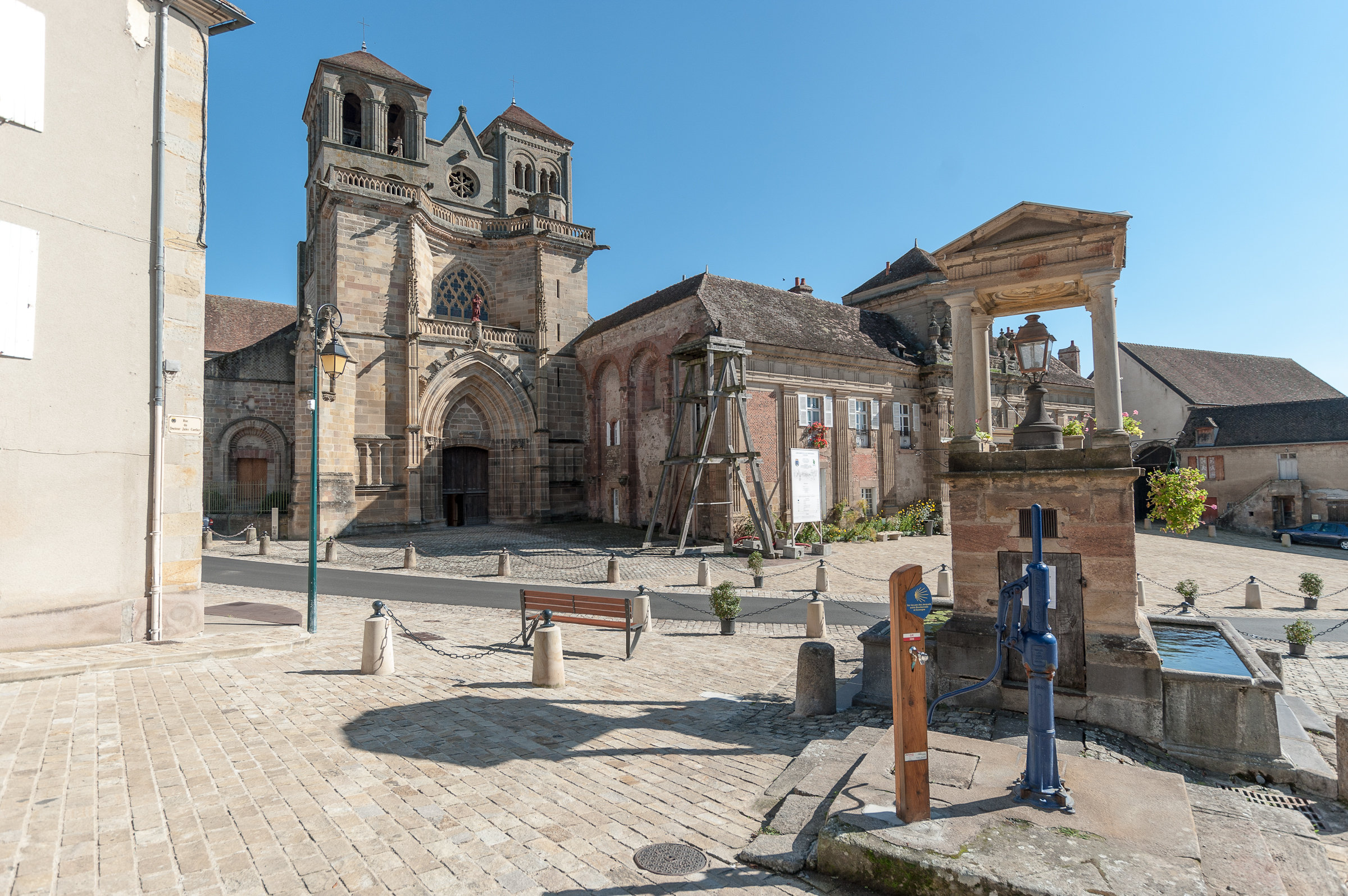
Priory church

== Monumental effigies ==
The church formerly contained many tombs of the seigneurial and later ducal family of Bourbon, some of which were destroyed in the Revolution. Those of Saints Mayeul and Odilo were rediscovered in the early 21st century.

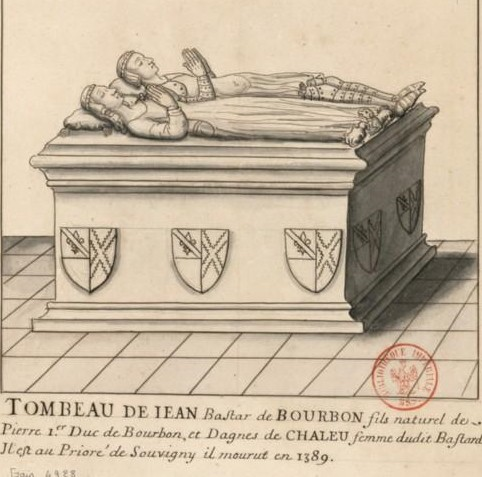
Jean de Bourbon, natural son of Louis I, Duke of Bourbon, and his second or third wife, Agnès de Chaleu

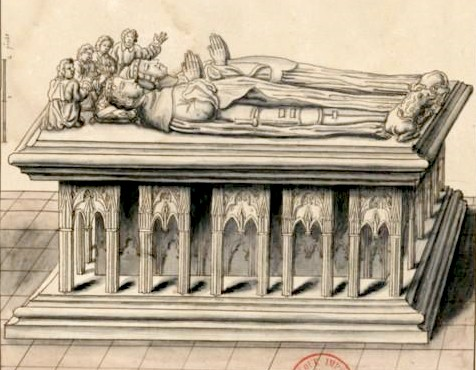
Charles I, Duke of Bourbon, and Agnes of Burgundy

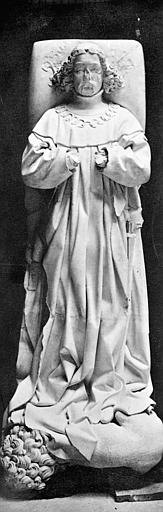
Charles I, Duke of Bourbon

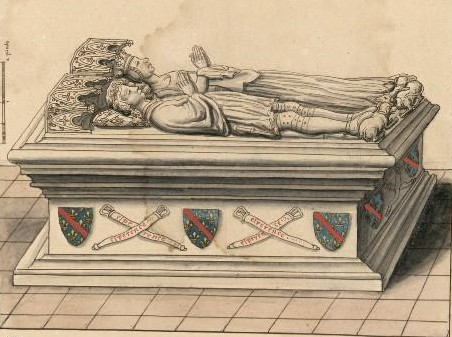
Louis II, Duke of Bourbon, and Anne of Auvergne

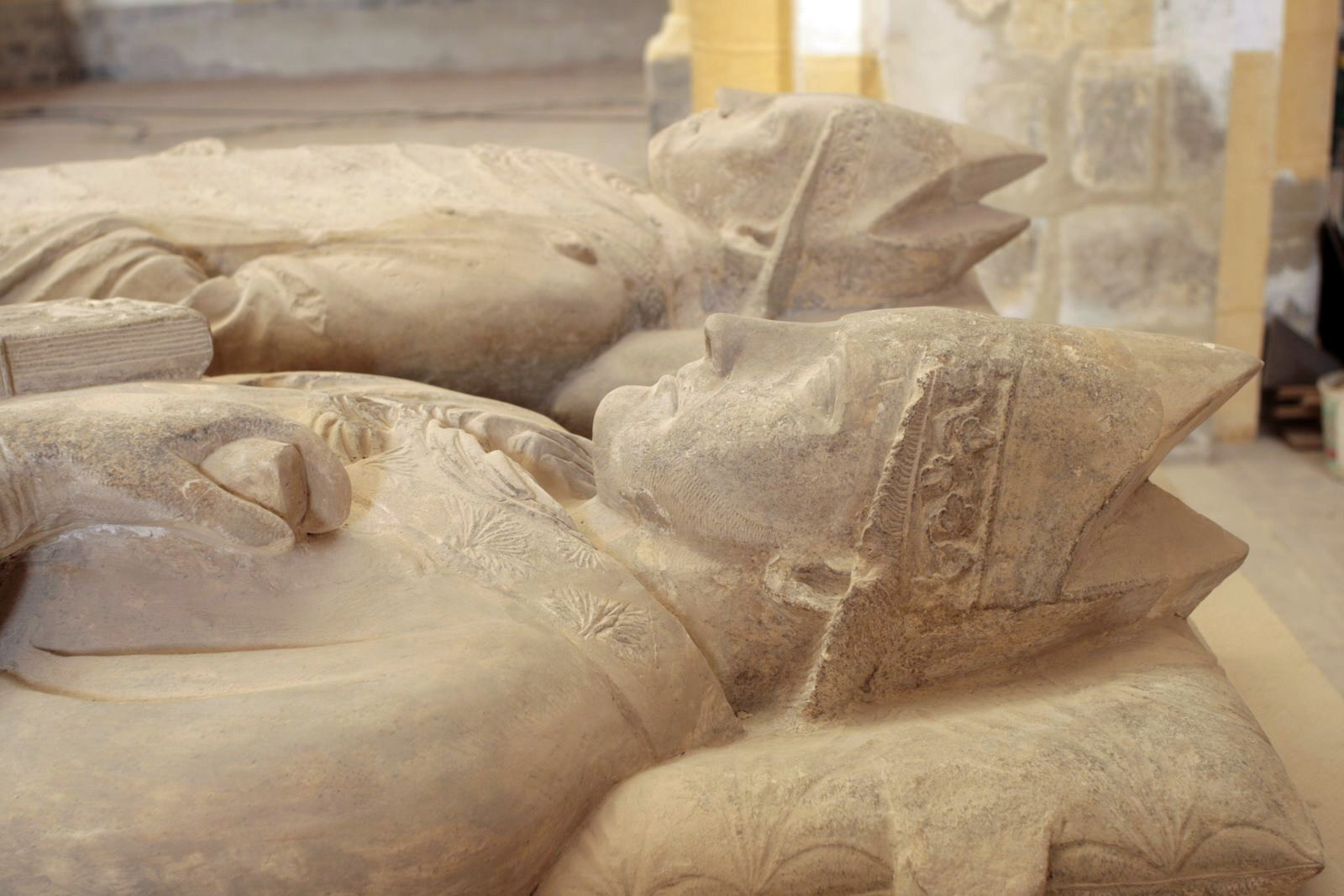
Saint Mayeul and Saint Odilo, abbots of Cluny

== Bibliography ==
- François Deshoulières, Souvigny, pp. 115–152, dans Congrès archéologique de France. 101st session. Dans l'Allier. 1938, Société Française d'Archéologie, Paris, 1939 Texte.
- Pascale Chevalier, Sébastien Bully, Morana Causevic-Bully, Mathias Dupuis, Laurent Fiocchi et Audrey Baradat, « La priorale Saint-Pierre de Souvigny (Allier), étude archéologique de la nef, première tranche », Bulletin du centre d'études médiévales d'Auxerre/BUCEMA, 11-2007.
  - La priorale Saint-Pierre de Souvigny (Allier), étude archéologique de la nef, première tranche ;
  - Deuxième tranche de travaux archéologiques à la priorale Saint-Pierre de Souvigny.
- Bruno Phalip, Pascale Chevalier, Arlette Maquet, Delphine Renault-Jousseau, Souvigny : la priorale et le prieuré (Cahiers du Patrimoine, 101), Somogy, 2012, 216 p., 260 ill. ISBN 9782757206102
- Pascale Chevalier, Arlette Maquet, « Les fouilles des tombeaux des saints abbés de Cluny, Mayeul et Odilon et les pèlerinages à Souvigny », Bulletin Monumental, t. 162., n° 2, année 2004, pp. 87–100.

=== External links ===
- Corpus architecturae religiosae europeae (CARE) - Souvigny: priorale Saint-Pierre (in French)
- Orgues de France. The Priory's Clicquot organ (in French)
- List of cartularies attached to Souvigny Priory (in French)
