= Avril-sur-Loire =

- Commune
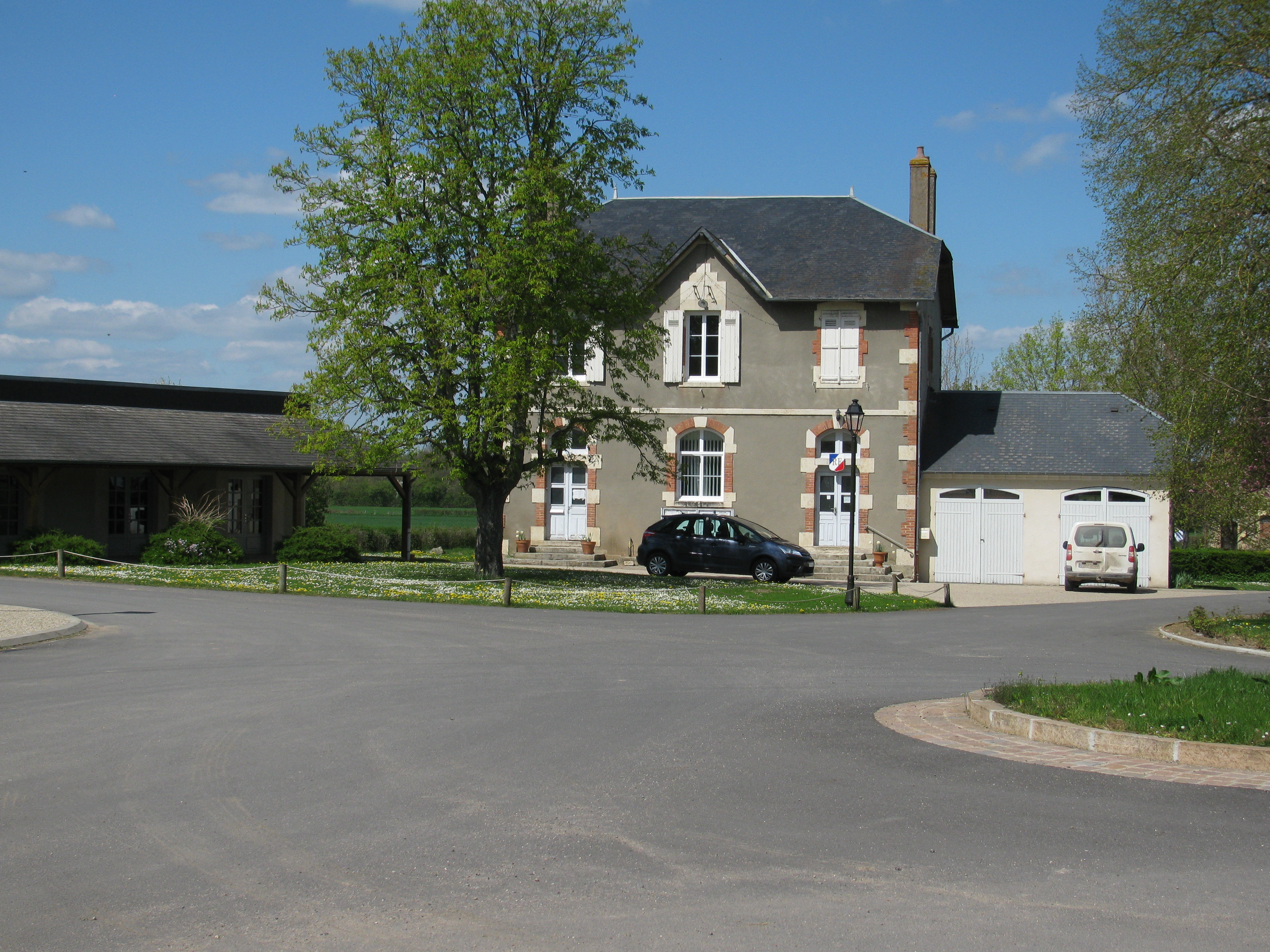
- The town hall in Avril-sur-Loire
- Location of Avril-sur-Loire
- Location within France Location within Bourgogne-Franche-Comté
- Coordinates: 46°49′14″N 3°21′30″E
- Country: France
- Region: Bourgogne-Franche-Comté
- Department: Nièvre
- Arrondissement: Nevers
- Canton: Saint-Pierre-le-Moûtier
- Intercommunality: CC Sud Nivernais

Government
  - Mayor (2020–2026): Élisabeth Escurat
- Area^{1}: 24.86 km^{2} (9.60 sq mi)
- Highest elevation: 251 m (823 ft)
- Lowest elevation: 182 m (597 ft)
- Population (2023): 245
  - Density: 9.86/km^{2} (25.5/sq mi)
- Time zone: UTC+01:00 (CET)
  - Summer (DST): UTC+02:00 (CEST)
- INSEE/Postal code: 58020 /58300
- ^{1} French Land Register data, which excludes lakes, ponds, glaciers > 1 km^{2} (0.386 sq mi or 247 acres) and river estuaries.

Avril-sur-Loire (French pronunciation: [avʁil syʁ lwaʁ], lit. 'Avril-on-Loire') is a commune in the Nièvre department in central France.

== Population ==
Historical population
Year	Pop.	±% p.a.
1968	188	—
1975	193	+0.38%
1982	168	−1.96%
1990	235	+4.28%
1999	234	−0.05%
2007	246	+0.63%
2012	238	−0.66%
2017	268	+2.40%
2023	245	−1.48%
Source: INSEE

== See also ==
- Communes of the Nièvre department
