= Toury-sur-Jour =

- Commune
- Location of Toury-sur-Jour
- Location within France Location within Bourgogne-Franche-Comté
- Coordinates: 46°43′47″N 3°14′29″E
- Country: France
- Region: Bourgogne-Franche-Comté
- Department: Nièvre
- Arrondissement: Nevers
- Canton: Saint-Pierre-le-Moûtier
- Intercommunality: Nivernais Bourbonnais

Government
  - Mayor (2020–2026): Nicole Robert
- Area^{1}: 24.40 km^{2} (9.42 sq mi)
- Highest elevation: 258 m (846 ft)
- Lowest elevation: 214 m (702 ft)
- Population (2023): 125
  - Density: 5.12/km^{2} (13.3/sq mi)
- Time zone: UTC+01:00 (CET)
  - Summer (DST): UTC+02:00 (CEST)
- INSEE/Postal code: 58294 /58240
- ^{1} French Land Register data, which excludes lakes, ponds, glaciers > 1 km^{2} (0.386 sq mi or 247 acres) and river estuaries.

Toury-sur-Jour (French pronunciation: [tuʁi syʁ ʒuʁ]) is a commune in the Nièvre department in central France.

== See also ==
- Communes of the Nièvre department
