= Toury-Lurcy =

- Commune
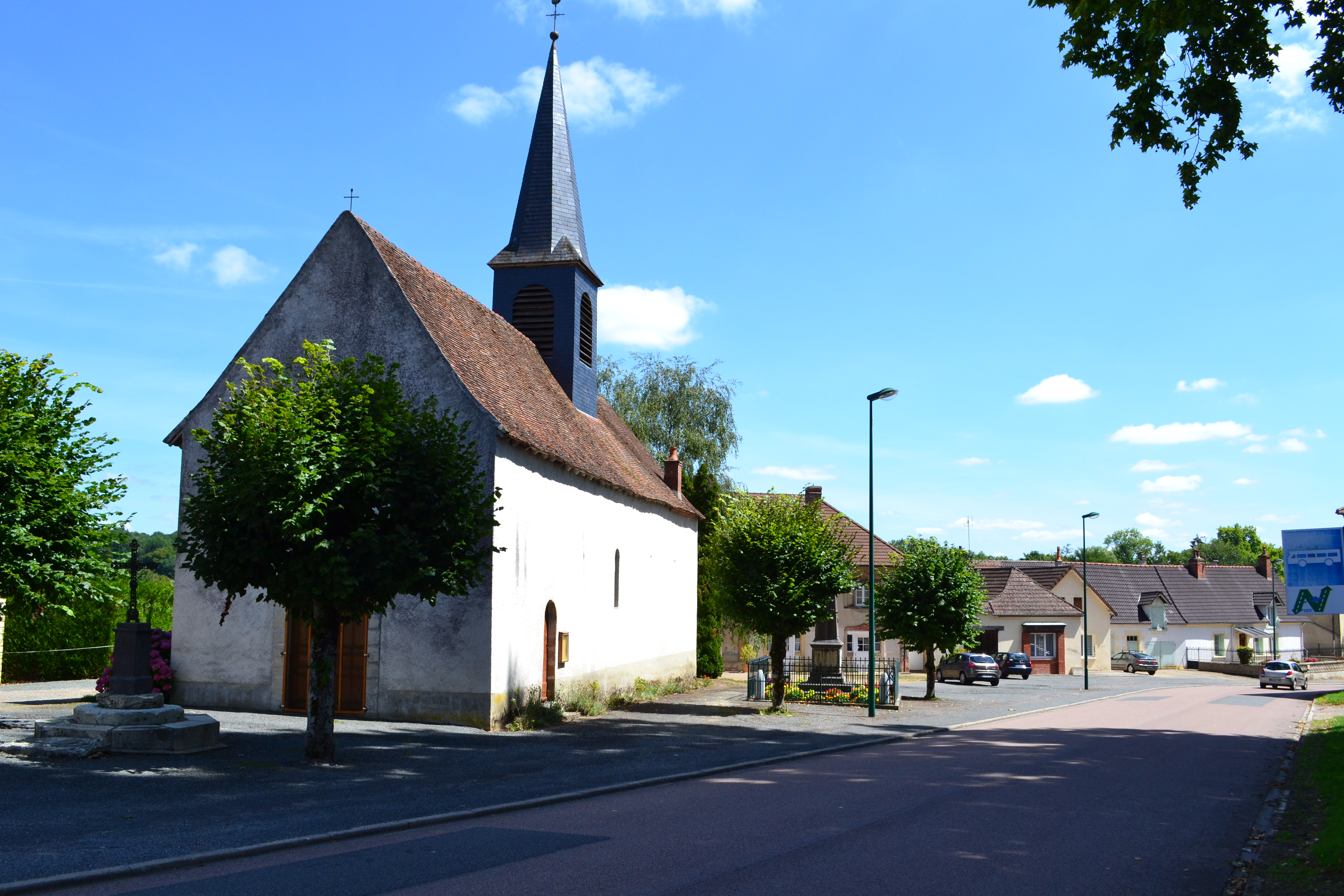
- The church in Toury-Lurcy
- Location of Toury-Lurcy
- Location within France Location within Bourgogne-Franche-Comté
- Coordinates: 46°44′22″N 3°25′33″E
- Country: France
- Region: Bourgogne-Franche-Comté
- Department: Nièvre
- Arrondissement: Nevers
- Canton: Saint-Pierre-le-Moûtier

Government
  - Mayor (2020–2026): Guy Hourcabie
- Area^{1}: 25.54 km^{2} (9.86 sq mi)
- Highest elevation: 252 m (827 ft)
- Lowest elevation: 197 m (646 ft)
- Population (2023): 404
  - Density: 15.8/km^{2} (41.0/sq mi)
- Time zone: UTC+01:00 (CET)
  - Summer (DST): UTC+02:00 (CEST)
- INSEE/Postal code: 58293 /58300
- ^{1} French Land Register data, which excludes lakes, ponds, glaciers > 1 km^{2} (0.386 sq mi or 247 acres) and river estuaries.

Toury-Lurcy (French pronunciation: [tuʁi lyʁsi]) is a commune in the Nièvre department in central France.

== History ==
From the 12th century, the village of Toury-Lurcy (formerly Thoriacum or Toriaco) was one of the fiefdoms of the Counts of Thoury (hence its name).

In 1161, the bishop of Nevers, Bernard of Saint-Saulge, recognized by letters sent to the abbot of St. Martin, Autun, that this church in his diocese was the property of the abbey, which was confirmed in 1164 by a bull of Pope Alexander III, then a refugee in France. The family of Richard de Soultrait were the local lords.

The town was created in 1823 from the merger of Toury and Lurcy-sur-Abron.

The Château de Toury-Lurcy, rebuilt in 1776 on a medieval site, is classified and registered as a historical monument.

== Notable people ==
- Georges de Soultrait, count, regional historian, born and died at Toury (1822–1888).
- Agnes de Tressolles, wife of Jean Saulnier.
- Florimond-Augustin Daubois, parish priest of Toury from 1710 to 1742, left many precious annotations on the margins of his actions in the parish registers.

== Population ==
Historical population
| Year | Pop. | ±% p.a. |
|---|---|---|
| 1968 | 451 | — |
| 1975 | 406 | −1.49% |
| 1982 | 389 | −0.61% |
| 1990 | 442 | +1.61% |
| 1999 | 427 | −0.38% |
| 2007 | 410 | −0.51% |
| 2012 | 425 | +0.72% |
| 2017 | 430 | +0.23% |
| 2023 | 404 | −1.03% |
Source: INSEE

== See also ==
- Communes of the Nièvre department
