= Neuville-lès-Decize =

- Commune
- Location of Neuville-lès-Decize
- Location within France Location within Bourgogne-Franche-Comté
- Coordinates: 46°46′16″N 3°18′57″E
- Country: France
- Region: Bourgogne-Franche-Comté
- Department: Nièvre
- Arrondissement: Nevers
- Canton: Saint-Pierre-le-Moûtier

Government
  - Mayor (2021–2026): Daniel Morin
- Area^{1}: 26.74 km^{2} (10.32 sq mi)
- Highest elevation: 267 m (876 ft)
- Lowest elevation: 205 m (673 ft)
- Population (2023): 208
  - Density: 7.78/km^{2} (20.1/sq mi)
- Time zone: UTC+01:00 (CET)
  - Summer (DST): UTC+02:00 (CEST)
- INSEE/Postal code: 58192 /58300
- ^{1} French Land Register data, which excludes lakes, ponds, glaciers > 1 km^{2} (0.386 sq mi or 247 acres) and river estuaries.

Neuville-lès-Decize (French pronunciation: [nøvil lɛ dəsiz], literally Neuville near Decize) is a commune in the Nièvre department in central France.

== See also ==
- Communes of the Nièvre department
