= Luthenay-Uxeloup =

- Commune
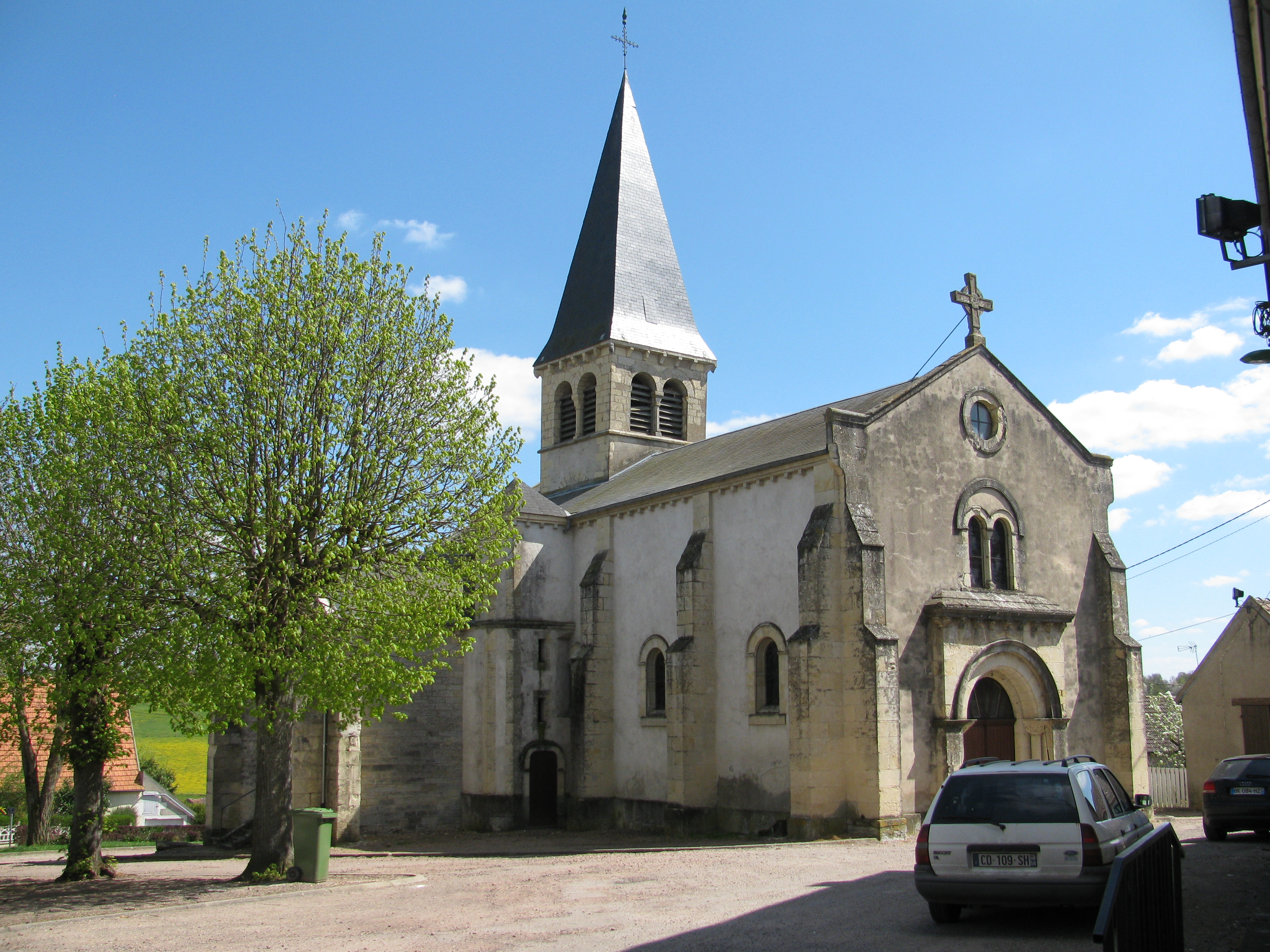
- The church of Saint-Aignan, in Luthenay-Uxeloup
- Location of Luthenay-Uxeloup
- Location within France Location within Bourgogne-Franche-Comté
- Coordinates: 46°51′05″N 3°15′51″E
- Country: France
- Region: Bourgogne-Franche-Comté
- Department: Nièvre
- Arrondissement: Nevers
- Canton: Saint-Pierre-le-Moûtier
- Intercommunality: Nivernais Bourbonnais

Government
  - Mayor (2020–2026): Nicolas Nolin
- Area^{1}: 37.69 km^{2} (14.55 sq mi)
- Highest elevation: 247 m (810 ft)
- Lowest elevation: 177 m (581 ft)
- Population (2023): 606
  - Density: 16.1/km^{2} (41.6/sq mi)
- Time zone: UTC+01:00 (CET)
  - Summer (DST): UTC+02:00 (CEST)
- INSEE/Postal code: 58148 /58240
- ^{1} French Land Register data, which excludes lakes, ponds, glaciers > 1 km^{2} (0.386 sq mi or 247 acres) and river estuaries.

Luthenay-Uxeloup is a commune in the Nièvre department in central France.

== See also ==
- Communes of the Nièvre department
