= Saint-Parize-le-Châtel =

- Commune
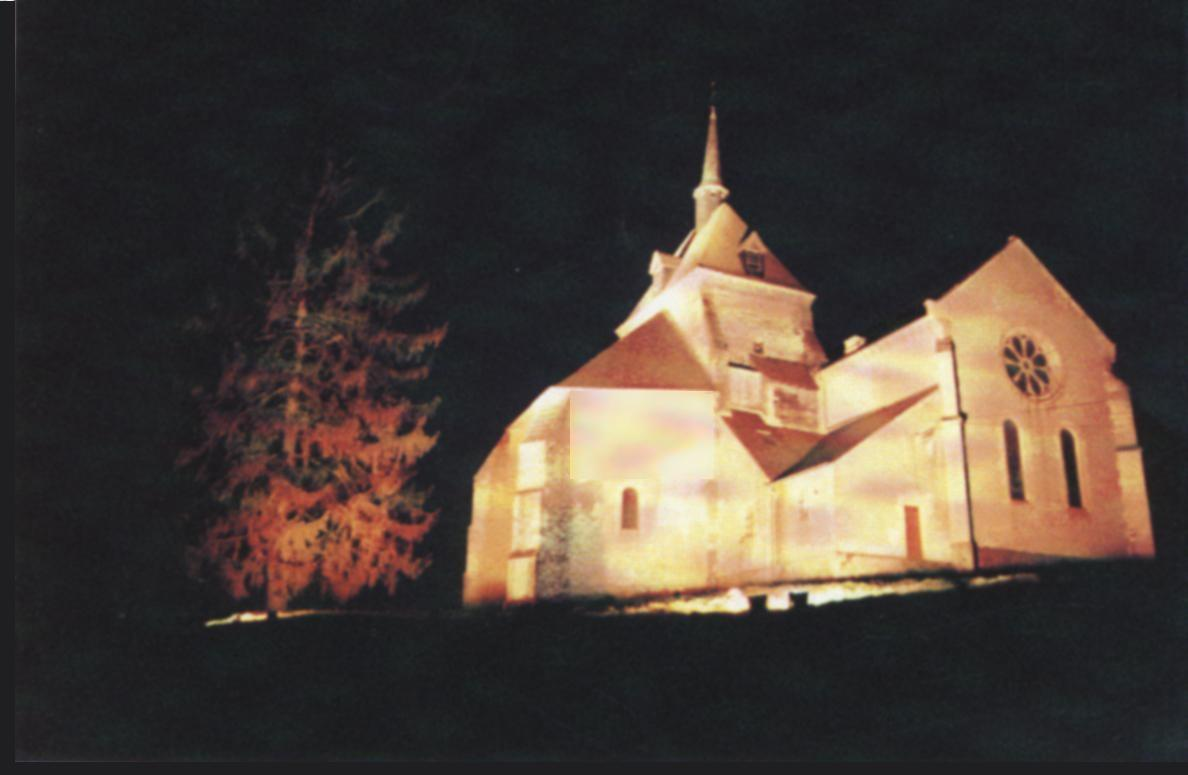
- Saint-Patrice Church in Saint-Parize-le-Châtel
- Location of Saint-Parize-le-Châtel
- Location within France Location within Bourgogne-Franche-Comté
- Coordinates: 46°51′18″N 3°10′57″E
- Country: France
- Region: Bourgogne-Franche-Comté
- Department: Nièvre
- Arrondissement: Nevers
- Canton: Saint-Pierre-le-Moûtier
- Intercommunality: Loire et Allier

Government
  - Mayor (2020–2026): André Garcia
- Area^{1}: 49.11 km^{2} (18.96 sq mi)
- Highest elevation: 247 m (810 ft)
- Lowest elevation: 180 m (590 ft)
- Population (2023): 1,227
  - Density: 24.98/km^{2} (64.71/sq mi)
- Time zone: UTC+01:00 (CET)
  - Summer (DST): UTC+02:00 (CEST)
- INSEE/Postal code: 58260 /58490
- ^{1} French Land Register data, which excludes lakes, ponds, glaciers > 1 km^{2} (0.386 sq mi or 247 acres) and river estuaries.

Saint-Parize-le-Châtel (French pronunciation: [sɛ̃ paʁiz lə ʃatɛl]) is a commune in the Nièvre département in central France.

The Circuit de Nevers Magny-Cours, a famous motor racing circuit that hosts the Formula One French Grand Prix, is located in the communes of Magny-Cours and Saint-Parize-le-Châtel.

== History ==
The area was evangelised in the 6th century by Patricius (Saint Patrice), a monk after whom the village was named. Before that, the place was known as Gentilico, Gentiliaco or Gentilly.

During the French Revolution, Saint-Parize-le-Châtel was renamed Brennery for some months.

== Sights and monuments ==
- Château de Villars: 14th-century castle, parts of which have been listed since 1951 as a monument historique by the French Ministry of Culture.
- Église Saint-Patrice (St Patrick's Church): the 12th-century church and its crypt have been listed as a monument historique since 1862.
- Château de la Chasseigne: 15th-century manor house.
- Château de Tâche: 16th century-hunting lodge
- Château de Lange: fortified house whose origin was a small 12th-century castle. The present structure dates from the 15th century.
- Les Fonts-Bouillants: sparkling water springs, exploited commercially between 1895 and 1975.
- Fontaine des vertus: spring in forest, from the same origin as the Fonts-Bouillants. The water is frequently bouillonnante (bubbling), caused by the release of carbon dioxide. According to local legend, Joan of Arc washed her sword in it after liberating Saint-Pierre-le-Moûtier in 1429.
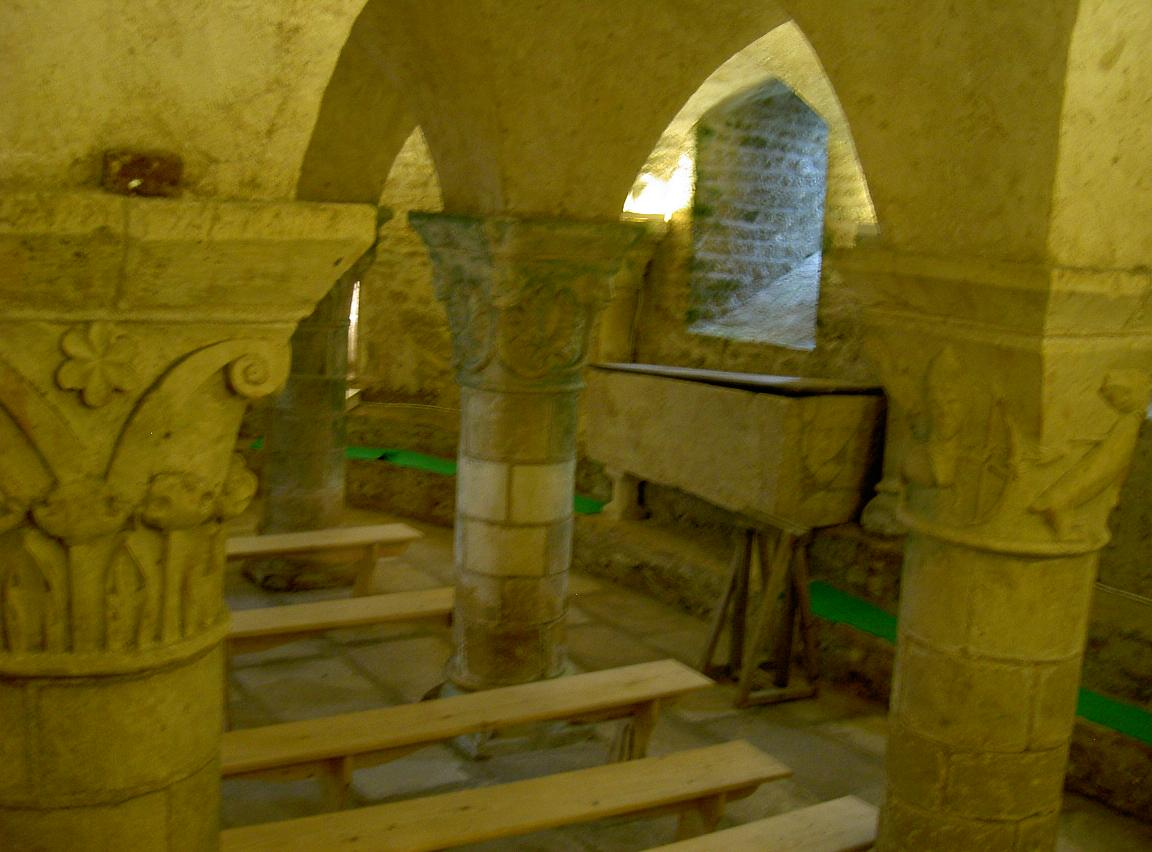
Crypt of Saint-Patrice Church

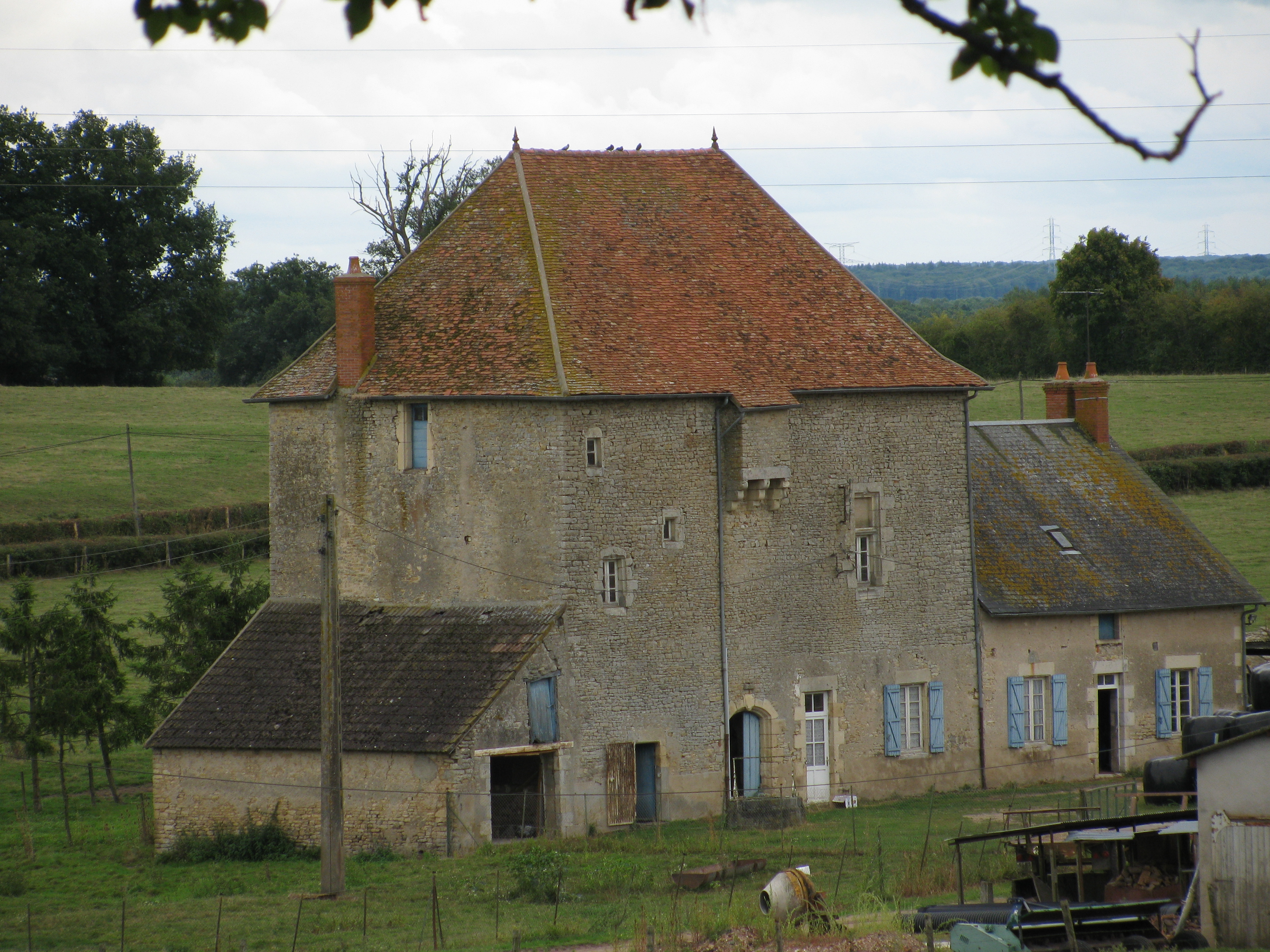
Château de Lange

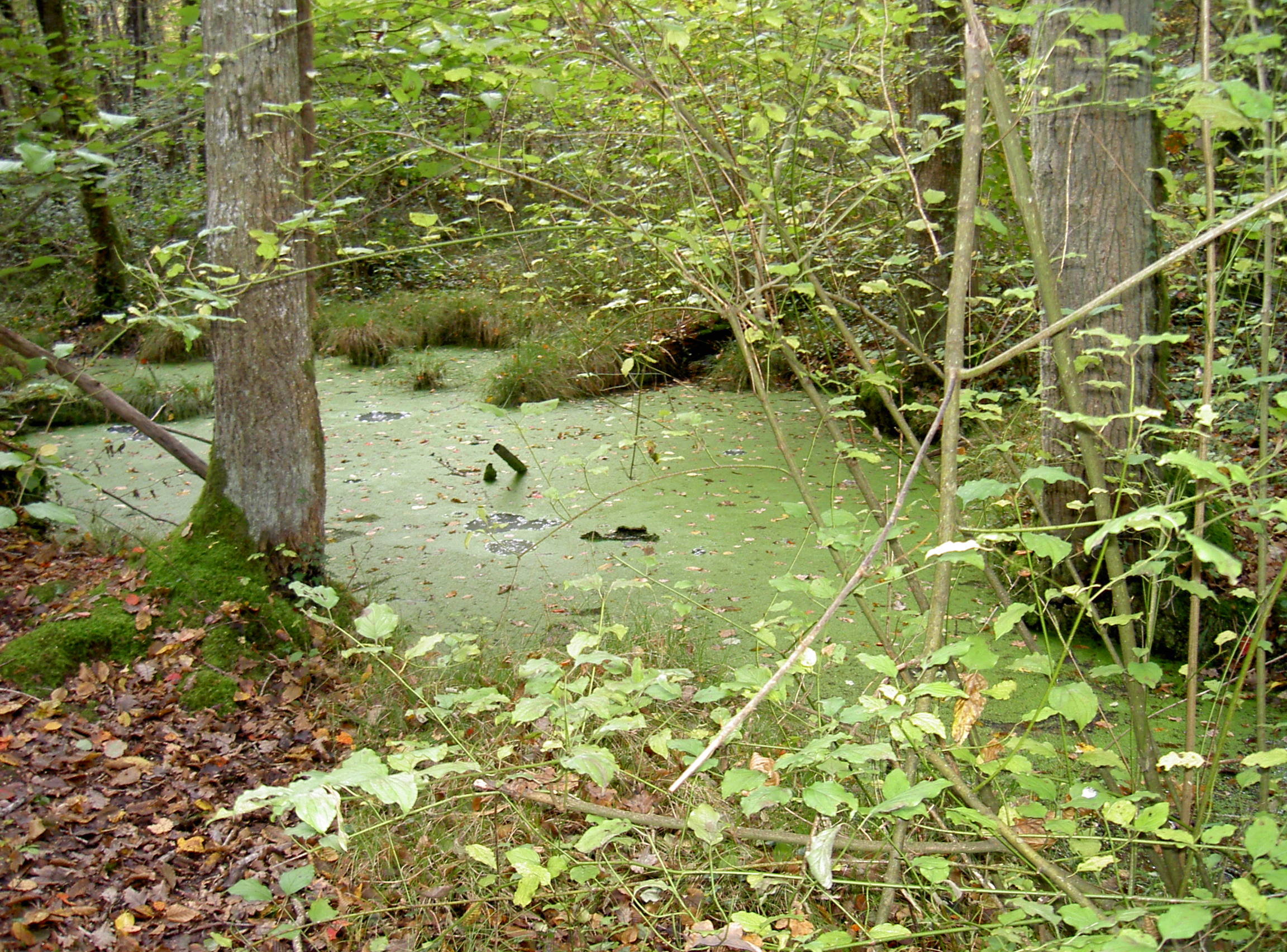
The Fontaine des vertus

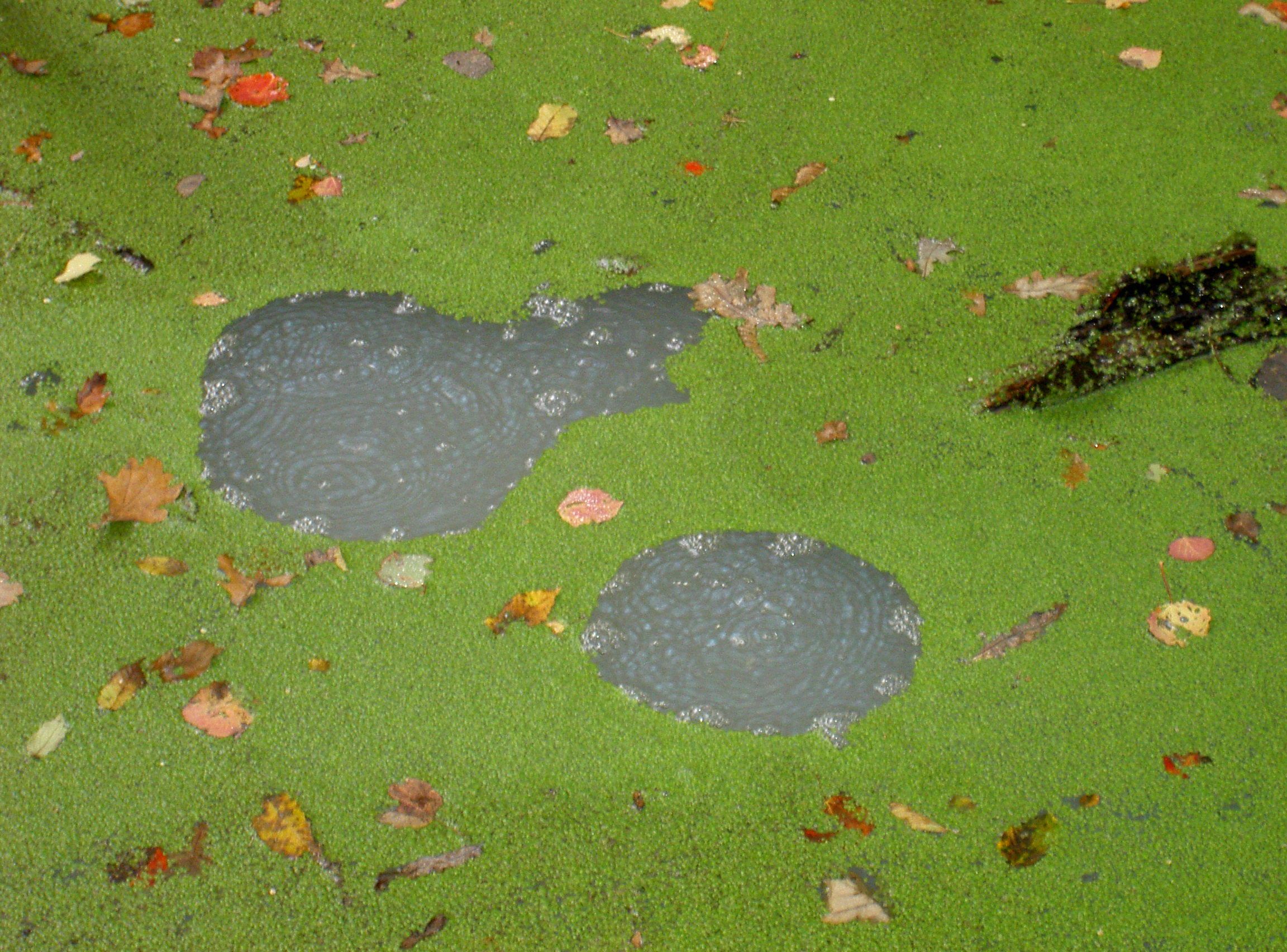
The "Bouillonnements"

== See also ==
- Communes of the Nièvre department
