= Fleury-sur-Loire =

- Commune
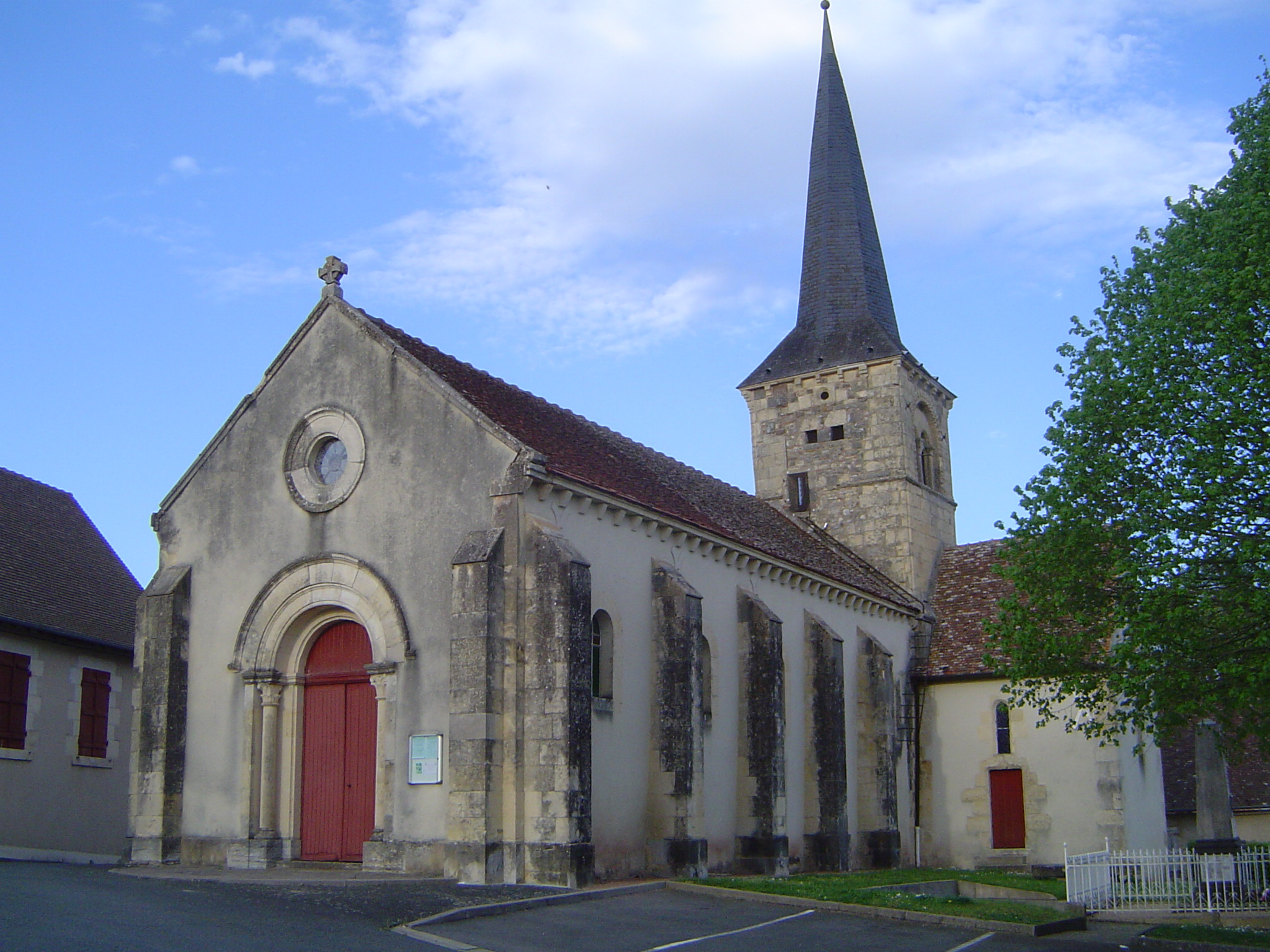
- The church in Fleury-sur-Loire
- Location of Fleury-sur-Loire
- Location within France Location within Bourgogne-Franche-Comté
- Coordinates: 46°50′13″N 3°19′15″E
- Country: France
- Region: Bourgogne-Franche-Comté
- Department: Nièvre
- Arrondissement: Nevers
- Canton: Saint-Pierre-le-Moûtier
- Intercommunality: Sud Nivernais

Government
  - Mayor (2020–2026): Sandra Bouillon
- Area^{1}: 19.74 km^{2} (7.62 sq mi)
- Highest elevation: 244 m (801 ft)
- Lowest elevation: 178 m (584 ft)
- Population (2023): 230
  - Density: 12/km^{2} (30/sq mi)
- Time zone: UTC+01:00 (CET)
  - Summer (DST): UTC+02:00 (CEST)
- INSEE/Postal code: 58115 /58240
- ^{1} French Land Register data, which excludes lakes, ponds, glaciers > 1 km^{2} (0.386 sq mi or 247 acres) and river estuaries.

Fleury-sur-Loire (French pronunciation: [flœʁi syʁ lwaʁ], literally Fleury on Loire) is a commune in the Nièvre department in central France.

== See also ==
- Communes of the Nièvre department
