= Tresnay =

- Commune
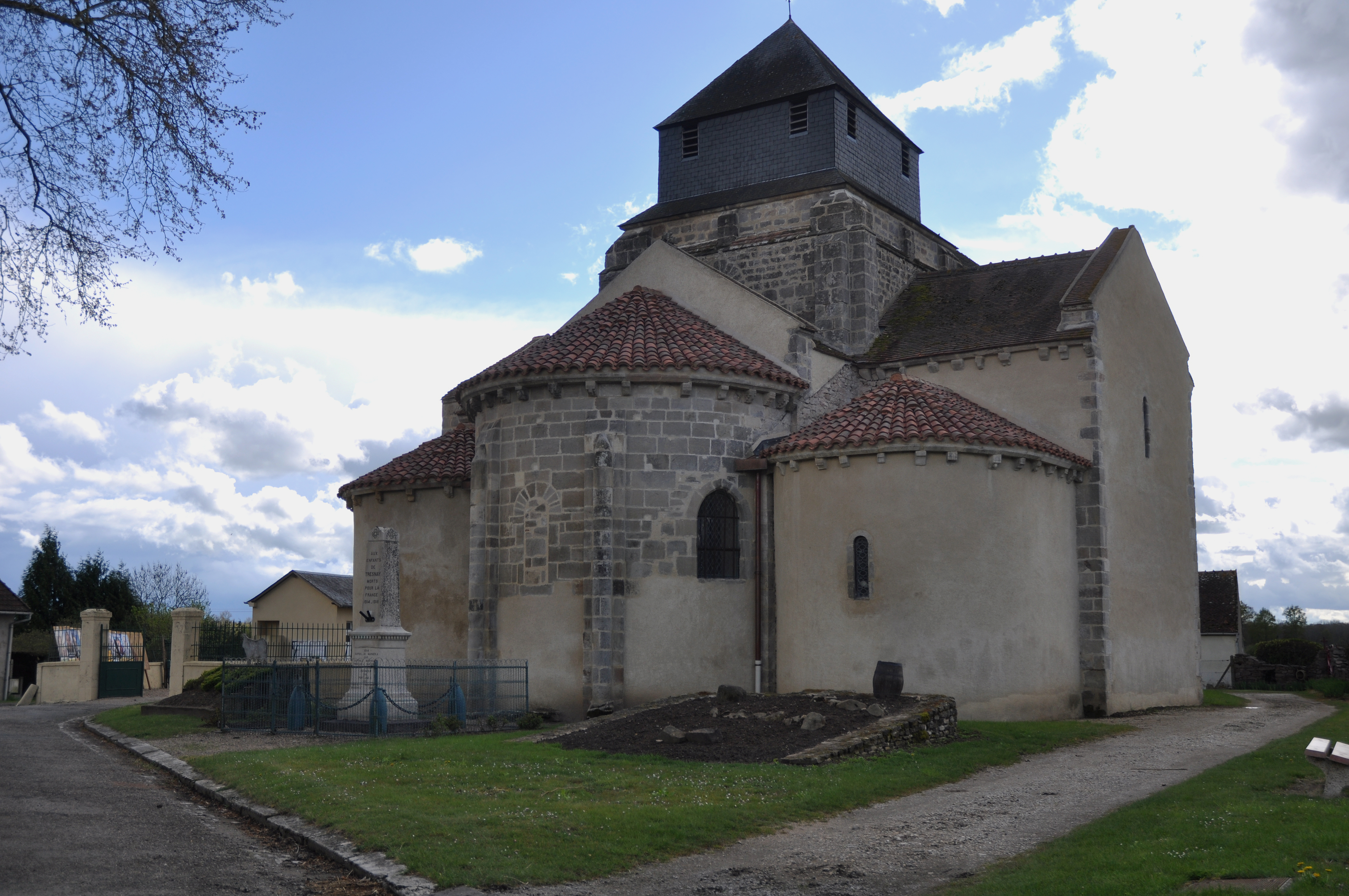
- The church in Tresnay

- Coat of arms
- Location of Tresnay
- Location within France Location within Bourgogne-Franche-Comté
- Coordinates: 46°41′52″N 3°11′17″E
- Country: France
- Region: Bourgogne-Franche-Comté
- Department: Nièvre
- Arrondissement: Nevers
- Canton: Saint-Pierre-le-Moûtier
- Intercommunality: Nivernais Bourbonnais

Government
  - Mayor (2024–2026): Gisèle Naty
- Area^{1}: 18.15 km^{2} (7.01 sq mi)
- Highest elevation: 225 m (738 ft)
- Lowest elevation: 190 m (620 ft)
- Population (2023): 131
  - Density: 7.22/km^{2} (18.7/sq mi)
- Time zone: UTC+01:00 (CET)
  - Summer (DST): UTC+02:00 (CEST)
- INSEE/Postal code: 58296 /58240
- ^{1} French Land Register data, which excludes lakes, ponds, glaciers > 1 km^{2} (0.386 sq mi or 247 acres) and river estuaries.

Tresnay (French pronunciation: [tʁɛnɛ]) is a commune in the Nièvre department in central France. As of 2023, the population of the commune was 131.

== See also ==
- Communes of the Nièvre department
