= Souvigny =

- Commune
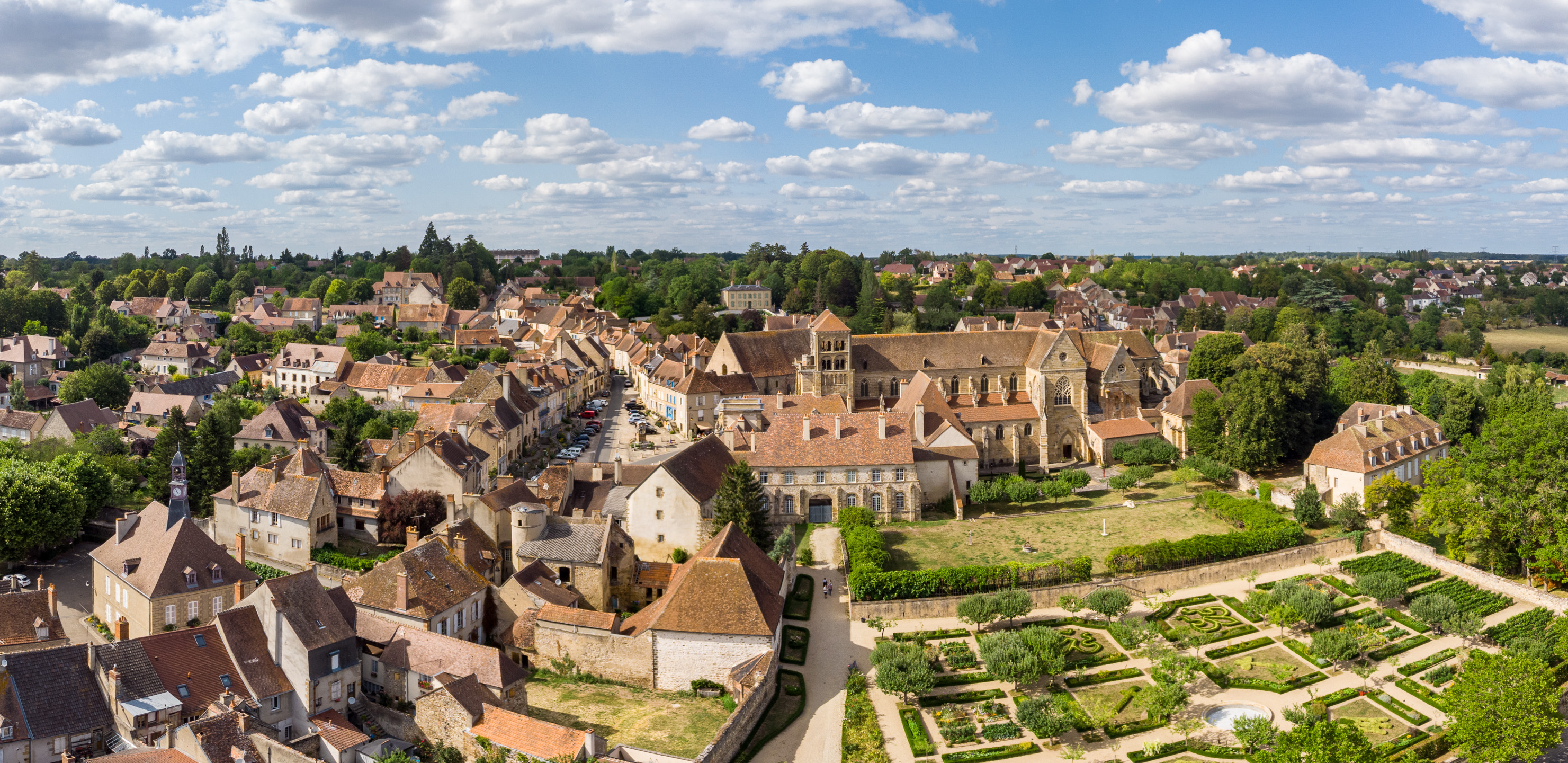
- A panoramic view of Souvigny with the priori

- Coat of arms
- Location of Souvigny
- Location within France Location within Auvergne-Rhône-Alpes
- Coordinates: 46°32′08″N 3°11′34″E
- Country: France
- Region: Auvergne-Rhône-Alpes
- Department: Allier
- Arrondissement: Moulins
- Canton: Souvigny
- Intercommunality: CA Moulins Communauté

Government
  - Mayor (2026–32): Michel Barbarin
- Area^{1}: 44.35 km^{2} (17.12 sq mi)
- Elevation: 242 m (794 ft)
- Highest elevation: 357 m (1,171 ft)
- Lowest elevation: 224 m (735 ft)
- Population (2023): 1,698
  - Density: 38.29/km^{2} (99.16/sq mi)
- Time zone: UTC+01:00 (CET)
  - Summer (DST): UTC+02:00 (CEST)
- INSEE/Postal code: 03275 /03210
- ^{1} French Land Register data, which excludes lakes, ponds, glaciers > 1 km^{2} (0.386 sq mi or 247 acres) and river estuaries.

Souvigny (French pronunciation: [suviɲi]) is a commune in the Allier department in Auvergne-Rhône-Alpes in central France.

Today the main town of a canton of the Allier department, Souvigny has long been one of the major towns in the Bourbonnais (of which it was once the capital), and the royal House of Bourbon was based there. Ties with the nearby Cluny Abbey add to its rich history.

== Population ==
Historical population
Year	Pop.	±% p.a.
1968	2,212	—
1975	2,119	−0.61%
1982	1,929	−1.33%
1990	2,024	+0.60%
1999	1,952	−0.40%
2007	1,950	−0.01%
2012	1,949	−0.01%
2017	1,828	−1.27%
2023	1,698	−1.22%
Source: INSEE

== Tourism ==
Souvigny was nominated “great regional site of Auvergne” in 1993 on the basis of its architectural riches, and subsequently, in 2003, it was made "great Romanesque sanctuary of Auvergne".

=== Sights ===
The museums, gardens, annual exhibitions, and excursions to the priory attract a great many tourists every year. The conserved wooded areas add to interest for tourists.

Souvigny Priory houses the remains of two abbots of Cluny who died at Souvigny: Mayeul, the fourth abbot (who died in 994) and his successor Odilon (who died in 1049). Their sepulchres, which had fallen into oblivion after the ravishings of the French Revolution, were rediscovered by archaeologists in 2001 and 2002.

The town has two primary schools and a public nursery school. Public events include:

- a botanical fair (in April)
- an antiques fair (in May)
- a medieval fair (beginning on the last Saturday of July)
- autumn music days (last weekend of September)
- regional sale of antiquarian books (in November).

=== Architecture ===
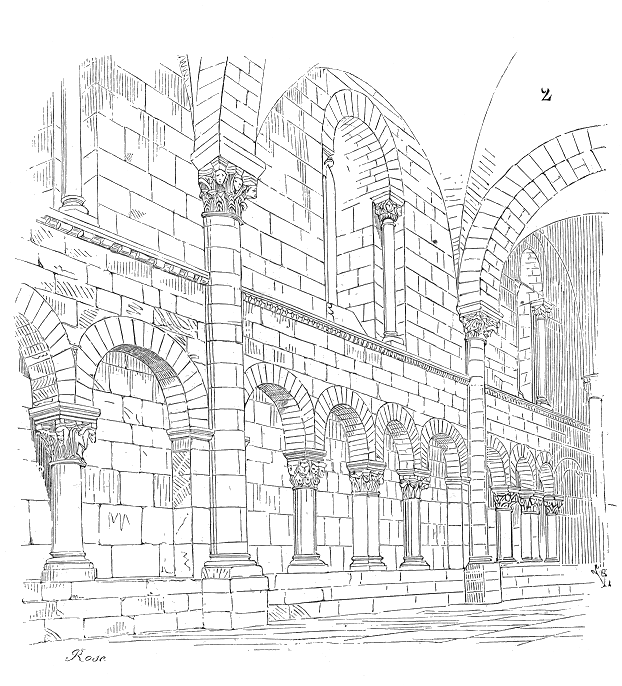
Arches in the Abbey Church

The Benedictine Priory and priory church of St Peter and St Paul is outstanding in the Bourbonnais region. Besides a few abbots, the Dukes of Bourbon were buried here. In 2010, the burial chapel was restored to mark the 600th anniversary of the death of Duke Louis II of Bourbon who is buried there.

The region shows a convergence of styles. While Romanesque buildings in the proper sense are not found here, influences from Auvergne, Berry and Bourguignon are combined. The restoration around 1435 exemplifies a more straightforward Gothic style.

== See also ==
- Communes of the Allier department
