= Chevenon =

- Commune
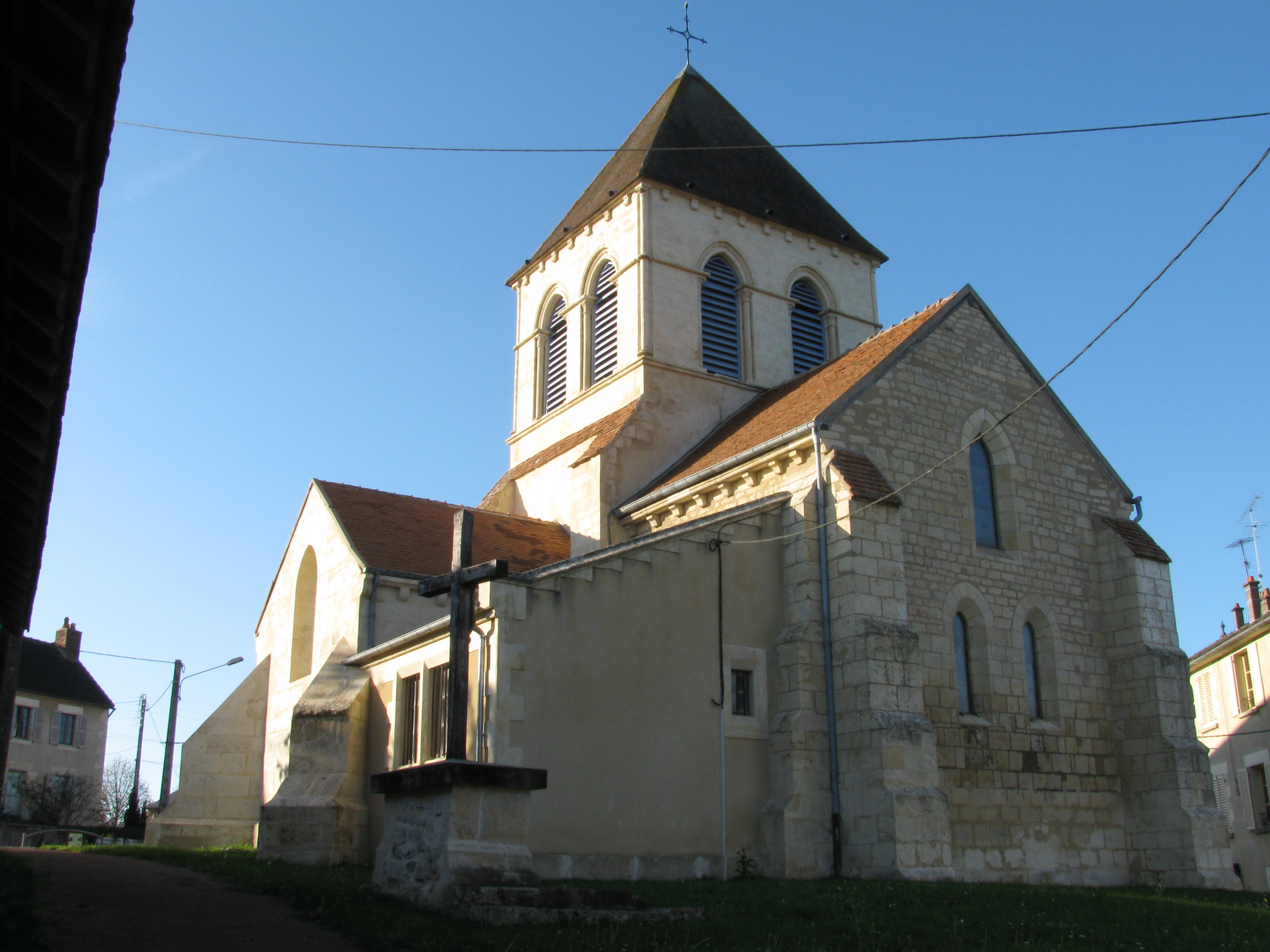
- The church of Saint-Martin, in Chevenon
- Location of Chevenon
- Location within France Location within Bourgogne-Franche-Comté
- Coordinates: 46°55′18″N 3°13′51″E
- Country: France
- Region: Bourgogne-Franche-Comté
- Department: Nièvre
- Arrondissement: Nevers
- Canton: Saint-Pierre-le-Moûtier
- Intercommunality: Loire et Allier

Government
  - Mayor (2020–2026): Emmanuel Loctin
- Area^{1}: 32.94 km^{2} (12.72 sq mi)
- Highest elevation: 241 m (791 ft)
- Lowest elevation: 172 m (564 ft)
- Population (2023): 635
  - Density: 19.3/km^{2} (49.9/sq mi)
- Time zone: UTC+01:00 (CET)
  - Summer (DST): UTC+02:00 (CEST)
- INSEE/Postal code: 58072 /58160
- ^{1} French Land Register data, which excludes lakes, ponds, glaciers > 1 km^{2} (0.386 sq mi or 247 acres) and river estuaries.

Chevenon (French pronunciation: [ʃəvnɔ̃]) is a commune in the Nièvre department in central France.

== Demographics ==
Historical population
Year	Pop.	±% p.a.
1968	757	—
1975	671	−1.71%
1982	643	−0.61%
1990	715	+1.34%
1999	662	−0.85%
2007	620	−0.82%
2012	601	−0.62%
2017	590	−0.37%
2023	635	+1.23%
Source: INSEE

== See also ==
- Communes of the Nièvre department
