= Canton of Saint-Pierre-le-Moûtier =

Administrative division of Nièvre, France

Coordinates: 46.79°N 3.12°E

The canton of Saint-Pierre-le-Moûtier is an administrative division of the Nièvre department, central France. Its borders were modified at the French canton reorganisation which came into effect in March 2015. Its seat is in Saint-Pierre-le-Moûtier.

It consists of the following communes:

1. Avril-sur-Loire
2. Azy-le-Vif
3. Chantenay-Saint-Imbert
4. Chevenon
5. Dornes
6. Fleury-sur-Loire
7. Langeron
8. Livry
9. Luthenay-Uxeloup
10. Mars-sur-Allier
11. Neuville-lès-Decize
12. Saint-Parize-en-Viry
13. Saint-Parize-le-Châtel
14. Saint-Pierre-le-Moûtier
15. Toury-Lurcy
16. Toury-sur-Jour
17. Tresnay
