= Georges de Soultrait =

French historian

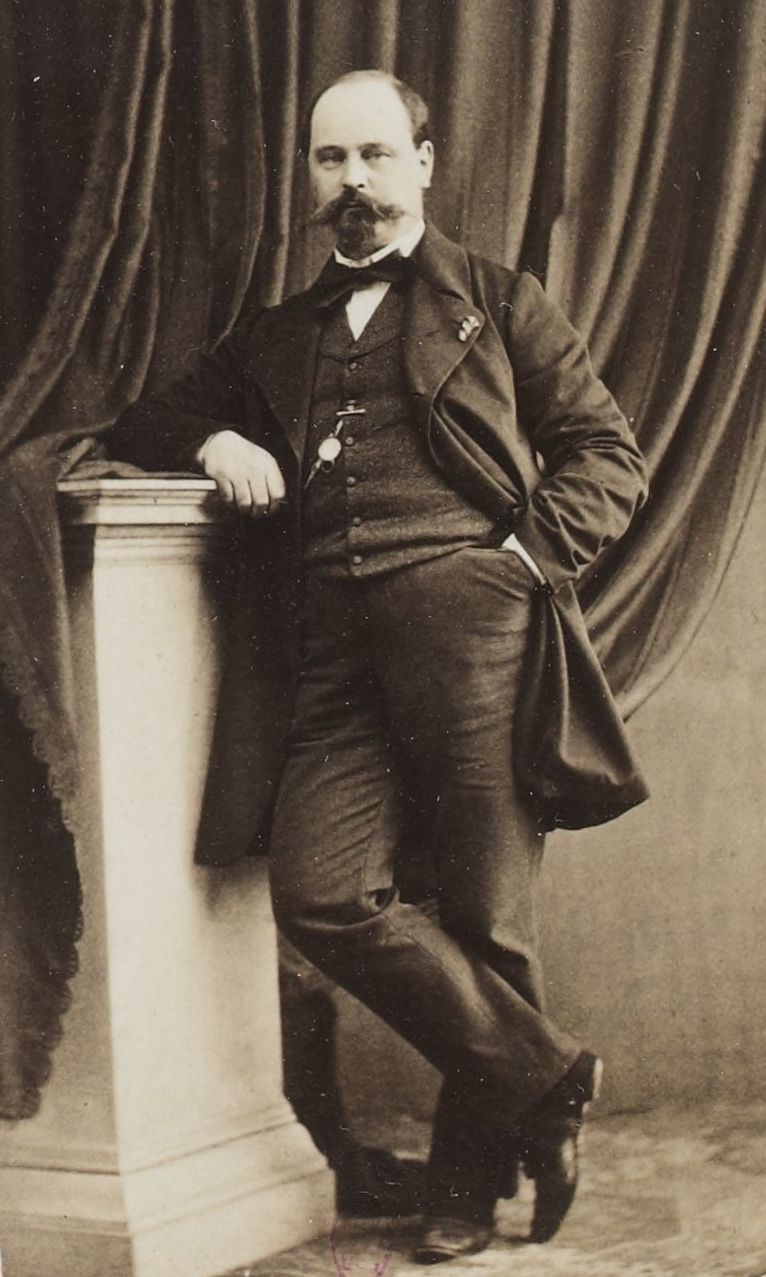
Georges de Soultrait.

Georges Richard Soultrait also known as Count de Soultrait, was a French writer and historian born June 27, 1822, in Toury-Lurcy, in the department of Nièvre and died September 18, 1888 in the same village.

== Family ==
A member of the Soultrait family, he was born in 1822 in Toury in the family castle and was the son of Gaspard-Antoine-Samuel Richard of Soultrait, Roman count "in a personal capacity" by pontifical brief of September 28, 1855 (born on June 3, 1793, in Nevers, and died in 1858), second lieutenant of the young Guard imperial, then captain in 1814, officer of the Legion of Honor, medalist of St. Helena, commander of the pontifical order of St. Gregory the Great, and Hyacinthe-Esther Outrequin de Saint-Léger (1792-1878)).

He married on September 10, 1850, in Paris, Desiree Jeans (1825–1888), and they had 7 children.

== Career ==
He was first attached to the Ministry of Finance and then collector-collector in Lyon in 1863, the city where he resided until 1876, successively occupying the functions of President of the Savings Bank, administrator of the general dispensary and Member of the Board of Directors of the Hospices Civils. He then served as treasurer-general of Haute-Marne and Doubs.

Very early, he also has political responsibilities since he became Mayor of Toury at the age of 26 and, shortly thereafter, member of the General Council of Nièvre.

He was one of the founders of the Nivernese Society of Arts, Sciences and Arts (1851). Succeeding Monseigneur Crosnier and Louis Roubet, he became its president in 1886 until his death in 1888 at his château de Toury.

Many of his publications (see the list below) are, even today, so many must-sees for Nivernais researchers, such as his Topographic Dictionary of the Department of Nièvre (1862).

In 1862, on the proposal of the Committee on Historical and Scientific Works, he received the Legion of Honor.

He received a title of Roman count by pontifical brief of Pope Pius IX of August 2, 1850.

A street in Nevers bears his name.

== Publications ==
- Dictionnaire topographique du département de la Nièvre, 1865 (lire en ligne [archive])
- Armorial historique et archéologique du Nivernais
- Abrégé de la statistique monumentale de l'arrondissement de Nevers, 1851
- Rapport archéologique sur les cantons de Moulins (Ouest) et de Chevagnes (Allier), 1852
- Notice sur les stalles de l'église Notre-Dame de Bourg (Ain), 1852
- Considérations archéologiques sur les églises de Lyon, 1852
- Rapport archéologique sur l'église de Cuiseaux (S. et L.), 1852
- Armorial du Bourbonnais, 1857
- Abrégé de la statistique archéologique de l'arrondissement de Moulins, 1860
- Notice sur les jetons de plomb des archevêques de Lyon, 1869
- Inventaire des titres de Nevers de l'abbé de Marolles, 1873
- Répertoire archéologique du département de la Nièvre, Paris, 1875
- Notice sur les manuscrits du trésor de l'église métropolitaine de Lyon, Revue lyonnaise, 1883
- Le Château de La Bastie d'Urfé et ses seigneurs, 1886
