= Langeron =

- Commune
- Coat of arms
- Location of Langeron
- Location within France Location within Bourgogne-Franche-Comté
- Coordinates: 46°48′42″N 3°05′06″E
- Country: France
- Region: Bourgogne-Franche-Comté
- Department: Nièvre
- Arrondissement: Nevers
- Canton: Saint-Pierre-le-Moûtier
- Intercommunality: Nivernais Bourbonnais

Government
  - Mayor (2020–2026): David Verron
- Area^{1}: 20.26 km^{2} (7.82 sq mi)
- Highest elevation: 237 m (778 ft)
- Lowest elevation: 180 m (590 ft)
- Population (2023): 337
  - Density: 16.6/km^{2} (43.1/sq mi)
- Time zone: UTC+01:00 (CET)
  - Summer (DST): UTC+02:00 (CEST)
- INSEE/Postal code: 58138 /58240
- ^{1} French Land Register data, which excludes lakes, ponds, glaciers > 1 km^{2} (0.386 sq mi or 247 acres) and river estuaries.

Langeron (French pronunciation: [lɑ̃ʒʁɔ̃]) is a commune in the Nièvre department in central France.

== See also ==
- Communes of the Nièvre department
