= Azy-le-Vif =

- Commune
- Location of Azy-le-Vif
- Location within France Location within Bourgogne-Franche-Comté
- Coordinates: 46°47′11″N 3°13′49″E
- Country: France
- Region: Bourgogne-Franche-Comté
- Department: Nièvre
- Arrondissement: Nevers
- Canton: Saint-Pierre-le-Moûtier
- Intercommunality: Nivernais Bourbonnais

Government
  - Mayor (2020–2026): Didier Renard
- Area^{1}: 46.90 km^{2} (18.11 sq mi)
- Highest elevation: 256 m (840 ft)
- Lowest elevation: 193 m (633 ft)
- Population (2023): 188
  - Density: 4.01/km^{2} (10.4/sq mi)
- Time zone: UTC+01:00 (CET)
  - Summer (DST): UTC+02:00 (CEST)
- INSEE/Postal code: 58021 /58240
- ^{1} French Land Register data, which excludes lakes, ponds, glaciers > 1 km^{2} (0.386 sq mi or 247 acres) and river estuaries.

Azy-le-Vif (French pronunciation: [azi lə vif]) is a commune in the Nièvre department in central France.

== Population ==
Historical population
Year	Pop.	±% p.a.
1968	332	—
1975	253	−3.81%
1982	256	+0.17%
1990	227	−1.49%
1999	227	+0.00%
2007	226	−0.06%
2012	221	−0.45%
2017	206	−1.40%
2023	188	−1.51%
Source: INSEE

== See also ==
- Communes of the Nièvre department
