= Château de Villars =

14th-century castle in Nièvre, France

Coordinates: 46.8464°N 3.1231°E

The Château de Villard is a 14th-century castle in the commune of Saint-Parize-le-Châtel in the Nièvre département of France.

During the Hundred Years' War, the fortress was of great importance and was fought over by the French, English, Armagnacs and Bourbons. It is said that Joan of Arc stayed here before going to liberate Saint-Pierre-le-Moûtier. The castle has a round towers in each of the four corners, with a square tower in the middle of each side.

During the 19th century, the interior of the castle was converted for agricultural use and this continued until the 1970s. Since 2006, Hubert de Vassal and his wife, Ana, have been renovating the buildings which they inherited.

Parts of it have been listed since 1951 as a monument historique by the French Ministry of Culture.

In 2012, the architectural heritage association, Vieilles Maisons Françaises, awarded its first prize to Château de Villars for the ongoing renovation work.

== See also ==
- List of castles in France
