= Saint-Parize-en-Viry =

- Commune
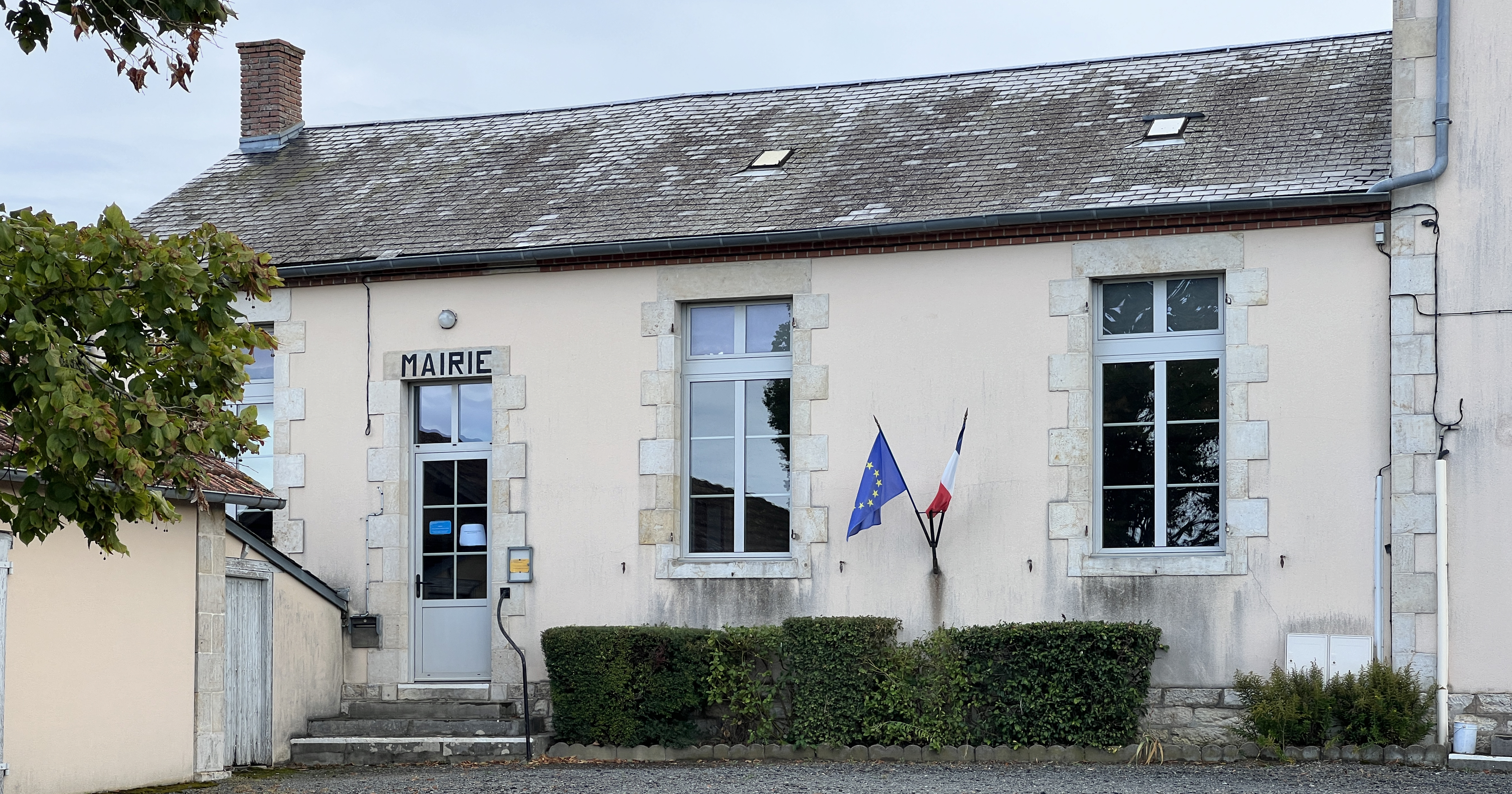
- Saint-Parize-en-Viry Town hall
- Location of Saint-Parize-en-Viry
- Location within France Location within Bourgogne-Franche-Comté
- Coordinates: 46°45′10″N 3°21′30″E
- Country: France
- Region: Bourgogne-Franche-Comté
- Department: Nièvre
- Arrondissement: Nevers
- Canton: Saint-Pierre-le-Moûtier
- Intercommunality: CA Moulins Communauté

Government
  - Mayor (2020–2026): Bastien Jayot
- Area^{1}: 15.51 km^{2} (5.99 sq mi)
- Highest elevation: 251 m (823 ft)
- Lowest elevation: 197 m (646 ft)
- Population (2023): 139
  - Density: 8.96/km^{2} (23.2/sq mi)
- Time zone: UTC+01:00 (CET)
  - Summer (DST): UTC+02:00 (CEST)
- INSEE/Postal code: 58259 /58300
- ^{1} French Land Register data, which excludes lakes, ponds, glaciers > 1 km^{2} (0.386 sq mi or 247 acres) and river estuaries.

Saint-Parize-en-Viry (French pronunciation: [sɛ̃ paʁiz ɑ̃ viʁi]) is a commune in the Nièvre department in central France.

== See also ==
- Communes of the Nièvre department
