= Mars-sur-Allier =

- Commune
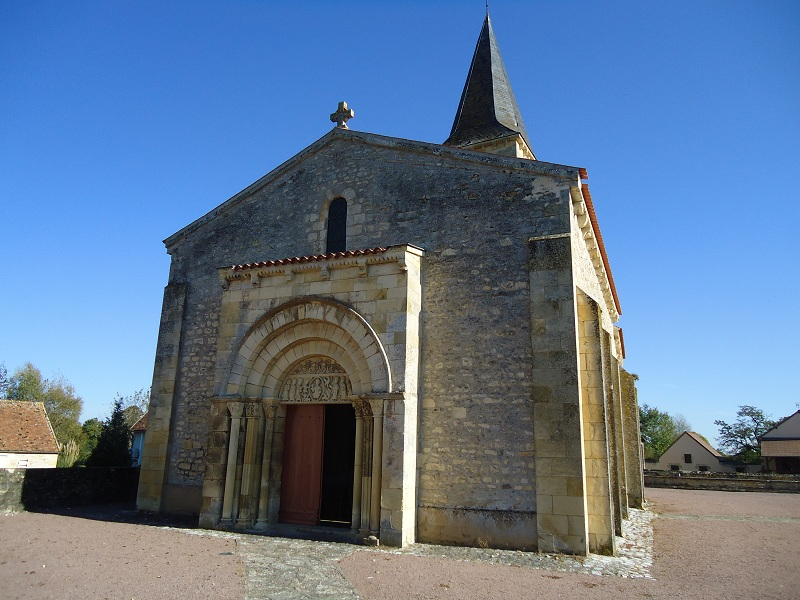
- The church in Mars-sur-Allier

- Coat of arms
- Location of Mars-sur-Allier
- Location within France Location within Bourgogne-Franche-Comté
- Coordinates: 46°51′25″N 3°05′20″E
- Country: France
- Region: Bourgogne-Franche-Comté
- Department: Nièvre
- Arrondissement: Nevers
- Canton: Saint-Pierre-le-Moûtier
- Intercommunality: Loire et Allier

Government
  - Mayor (2020–2026): Jean Deleume
- Area^{1}: 20.93 km^{2} (8.08 sq mi)
- Highest elevation: 196 m (643 ft)
- Lowest elevation: 173 m (568 ft)
- Population (2023): 301
  - Density: 14.4/km^{2} (37.2/sq mi)
- Time zone: UTC+01:00 (CET)
  - Summer (DST): UTC+02:00 (CEST)
- INSEE/Postal code: 58158 /58240
- ^{1} French Land Register data, which excludes lakes, ponds, glaciers > 1 km^{2} (0.386 sq mi or 247 acres) and river estuaries.

Mars-sur-Allier (French pronunciation: [maʁs syʁ alje]) is a commune in the Nièvre department in central France.

== See also ==
- Communes of the Nièvre department
